= Slide Mountain (Ulster County, New York) =

Highest peak of New York's Catskill Mountains

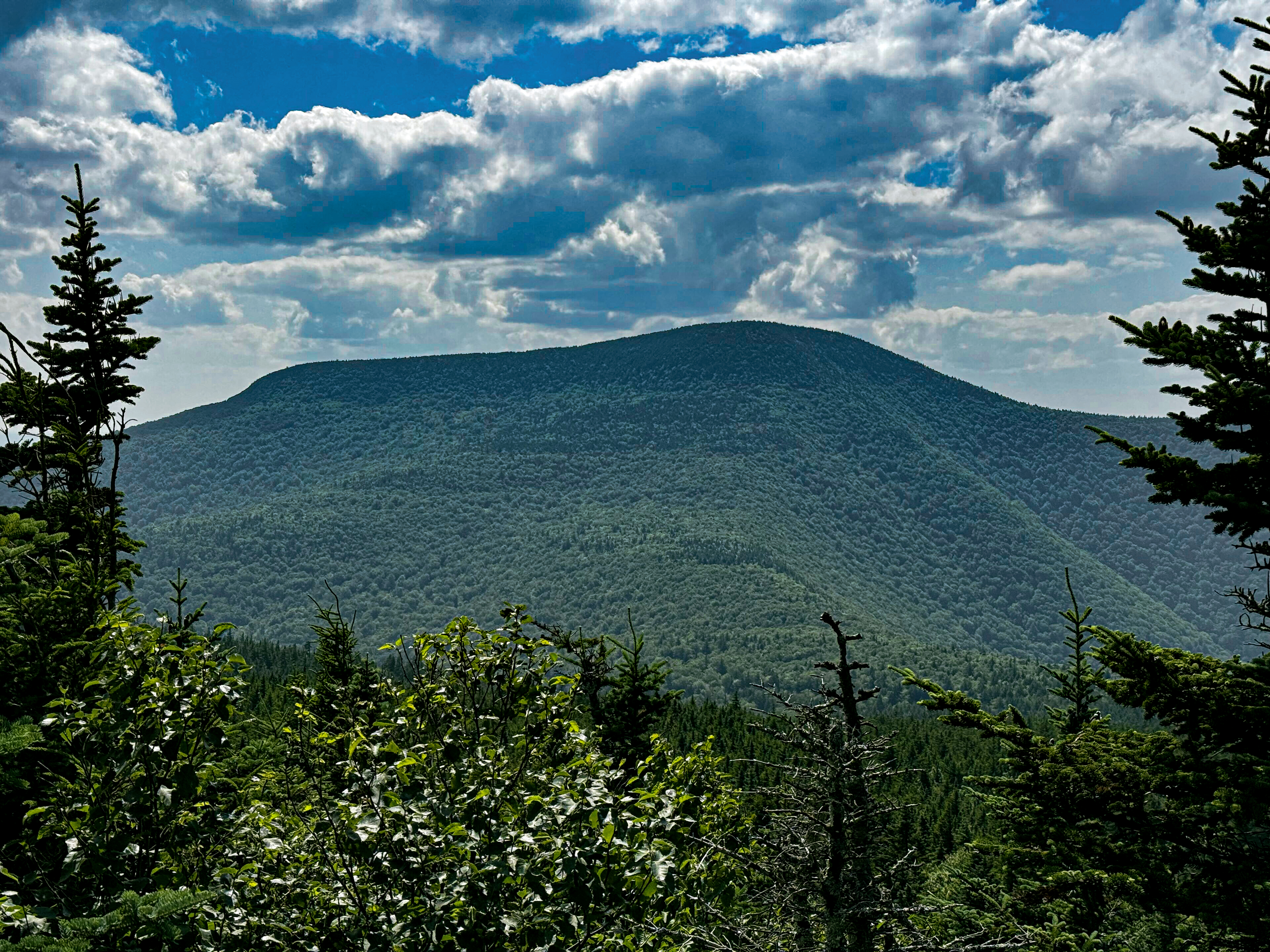
- Slide Mountain seen from Cornell Mountain

Highest point
- Elevation: c. 4,180 feet (1,270 m)
- Prominence: 3,300 ft (1,000 m)
- Listing: North America isolated peaks 90th; Catskill High Peaks 1st; Northeast 111 67th; New York County High Points 3rd; Catskill Top 102 1st
- Coordinates: 41°59′55″N 74°23′11″W

Geography
- Location within New York Location within the United States
- Location: Shandaken, New York, U.S.
- Parent range: Burroughs Range
- Topo map: Peekamoose Mountain

Climbing
- First ascent: unknown
- Easiest route: trail

Slide Mountain is the highest peak in the Catskill Mountains of the U.S. state of New York. It is located in the town of Shandaken in Ulster County. While the 4,180-foot (1,270 m) contour line on topographic maps is generally accepted as its height, the exact elevation of the summit has never been officially determined by the U.S. National Geodetic Survey or its predecessors, and many informal surveys suggest the mountain may actually top 4,200 feet (1,280 m) above sea level. Geographically, it is the highest natural point within the New York Metropolitan Area.

While it was not identified as the range's highest peak until the late 19th century, it has played a prominent role in Catskill history. Renowned naturalist John Burroughs wrote memorably of his climbs up Slide, and it helped get the Catskills added to New York's Forest Preserve. Bicknell's thrush was first identified on its summit.

== Geography ==
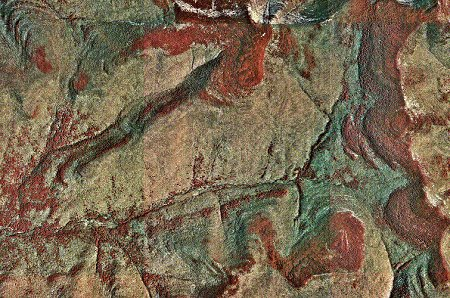
Aerial infrared view of Slide Mountain

Like most other Catskill peaks, Slide's summit is gentle and rounded, taking the form of a narrow ridge that rises to a wider bump on its eastern end. From there the mountain slopes down steeply to the col with neighboring Cornell Mountain.

At the western end, a broad slope, part of the Catskill Divide, leads down to the gap between Slide and Hemlock Mountain to the west and Winnisook Lake, the source of Esopus Creek, to the mountain's northwest.

Two more pronounced ridges lead off the mountain, one to the southwest and the col with Wildcat Mountain, the other to the north and Giant Ledge.

Both upper branches of the Neversink River begin on the mountain's slopes.

In addition to the Catskills, Slide is also the highest point of:

- Ulster County.
- the New York metropolitan area, as defined by the U.S. Census Bureau
- the Delaware River watershed.
- all of the state of New York outside the Adirondack High Peaks region.
- a 300 kilometers (190 miles) radius of New York City. (Slide is located roughly 90 miles (140 km) north/northwest of Manhattan; the southwest flank of Vermont's Killington Peak, about 193 miles (311 km) north northeast of the Bronx, is the next closest point of equal elevation.)

It is also the southernmost peak in the Northeast exceeding 4,000 feet (1,200 m). The Appalachians do not rise to that level again until West Virginia.

=== Climate ===
These data are taken from the weather station at Winnisook Lake on the mountain's northwest slope.

Climate data for Slide Mountain, New York, 1991–2020 normals, extremes 1961–2012: 2650ft (808m)
Month	Jan	Feb	Mar	Apr	May	Jun	Jul	Aug	Sep	Oct	Nov	Dec	Year
Record high °F (°C)	57 (14)	58 (14)	76 (24)	85 (29)	87 (31)	86 (30)	90 (32)	91 (33)	84 (29)	80 (27)	72 (22)	61 (16)	91 (33)
Mean maximum °F (°C)	48.9 (9.4)	48.7 (9.3)	60.3 (15.7)	72.0 (22.2)	78.2 (25.7)	80.6 (27.0)	82.2 (27.9)	80.8 (27.1)	77.1 (25.1)	71.3 (21.8)	62.1 (16.7)	49.3 (9.6)	84.7 (29.3)
Mean daily maximum °F (°C)	27.5 (−2.5)	30.1 (−1.1)	37.6 (3.1)	50.6 (10.3)	62.2 (16.8)	69.4 (20.8)	74.0 (23.3)	72.6 (22.6)	66.6 (19.2)	54.7 (12.6)	42.9 (6.1)	32.3 (0.2)	51.7 (11.0)
Daily mean °F (°C)	19.9 (−6.7)	21.7 (−5.7)	29.0 (−1.7)	40.9 (4.9)	52.6 (11.4)	60.4 (15.8)	64.8 (18.2)	63.5 (17.5)	57.1 (13.9)	46.3 (7.9)	35.6 (2.0)	25.8 (−3.4)	43.1 (6.2)
Mean daily minimum °F (°C)	12.3 (−10.9)	13.3 (−10.4)	20.4 (−6.4)	31.1 (−0.5)	43.0 (6.1)	51.3 (10.7)	55.6 (13.1)	54.3 (12.4)	47.7 (8.7)	38.0 (3.3)	28.3 (−2.1)	19.2 (−7.1)	34.5 (1.4)
Mean minimum °F (°C)	−9.6 (−23.1)	−5.3 (−20.7)	−0.4 (−18.0)	16.4 (−8.7)	29.3 (−1.5)	37.6 (3.1)	44.0 (6.7)	42.4 (5.8)	32.9 (0.5)	23.4 (−4.8)	11.6 (−11.3)	−1.8 (−18.8)	−11.8 (−24.3)
Record low °F (°C)	−23 (−31)	−23 (−31)	−17 (−27)	2 (−17)	16 (−9)	29 (−2)	35 (2)	28 (−2)	21 (−6)	14 (−10)	0 (−18)	−22 (−30)	−23 (−31)
Average precipitation inches (mm)	4.65 (118)	3.20 (81)	5.06 (129)	4.86 (123)	4.97 (126)	6.04 (153)	5.23 (133)	5.59 (142)	6.18 (157)	6.39 (162)	5.43 (138)	5.48 (139)	63.08 (1,601)
Average snowfall inches (cm)	24.6 (62)	20.6 (52)	18.5 (47)	5.9 (15)	0.4 (1.0)	0.0 (0.0)	0.0 (0.0)	0.0 (0.0)	0.0 (0.0)	2.2 (5.6)	9.3 (24)	23.2 (59)	104.7 (265.6)
Average extreme snow depth inches (cm)	18.3 (46)	21.3 (54)	21.4 (54)	9.5 (24)	0.2 (0.51)	0.0 (0.0)	0.0 (0.0)	0.0 (0.0)	0.0 (0.0)	2.1 (5.3)	4.1 (10)	12.7 (32)	29.7 (75)
Average precipitation days (≥ 0.01 in)	17.3	13.7	14.8	12.9	15.2	14.5	13.2	13.0	12.1	13.3	12.9	15.6	168.5
Average snowy days (≥ 0.1 in)	10.4	8.9	7.6	3.0	0.2	0.0	0.0	0.0	0.0	0.6	4.8	8.7	44.2
Source 1: NOAA
Source 2: XMACIS2 (mean maxima/minima, snow depth 1981–2010)

There is no weather station at the summit, but this climate table contains interpolated data for an area around the summit.

Climate data for Slide Mountain 41.9994 N, 74.3929 W, Elevation: 3,829 ft (1,167 m) (1991–2020 normals)
Month	Jan	Feb	Mar	Apr	May	Jun	Jul	Aug	Sep	Oct	Nov	Dec	Year
Mean daily maximum °F (°C)	26.3 (−3.2)	28.3 (−2.1)	35.3 (1.8)	47.1 (8.4)	58.5 (14.7)	66.2 (19.0)	70.3 (21.3)	68.9 (20.5)	63.4 (17.4)	52.1 (11.2)	40.5 (4.7)	30.7 (−0.7)	49.0 (9.4)
Daily mean °F (°C)	18.2 (−7.7)	19.5 (−6.9)	26.3 (−3.2)	37.3 (2.9)	48.4 (9.1)	56.5 (13.6)	60.7 (15.9)	59.6 (15.3)	53.8 (12.1)	43.1 (6.2)	32.8 (0.4)	23.5 (−4.7)	40.0 (4.4)
Mean daily minimum °F (°C)	10.1 (−12.2)	10.6 (−11.9)	17.2 (−8.2)	27.5 (−2.5)	38.2 (3.4)	46.8 (8.2)	51.1 (10.6)	50.2 (10.1)	44.2 (6.8)	34.0 (1.1)	25.2 (−3.8)	16.4 (−8.7)	31.0 (−0.6)
Average precipitation inches (mm)	5.33 (135)	4.08 (104)	5.99 (152)	5.73 (146)	5.55 (141)	6.70 (170)	6.49 (165)	6.66 (169)	6.86 (174)	7.22 (183)	6.14 (156)	6.37 (162)	73.12 (1,857)
Source: PRISM Climate Group

== History ==
=== Identification as highest Catskill peak ===
For a mountain with so many superlatives, Slide actually took a long time to be discovered for what it was.

The mountain received its name locally from a landslide in 1819 on its north face near the summit. The scar can still be seen today, and was partially gouged out again by another slide in 1982.

Slide would not be established as the highest peak in the range until 1886, long after much of the interior Northeast and their mountain ranges had been surveyed and settled. Due to land disputes and schemes that dated back to the colonial period, no complete, impartial survey of the entire Catskill region had been carried out until then.

Seven years earlier, Princeton geology professor Arnold Henry Guyot had been staying at the Catskill Mountain House when he became interested in the surrounding mountains, and management's claim that nearby Kaaterskill High Peak (3,655 ft or 1,114 m) was the highest in all the Catskills despite growing doubt. His survey, carried out on his own time and at his own expense, established that Slide, located some distance to the southwest, was far and away the highest peak in the range. His findings were vehemently disputed by the hotelkeepers around North-South Lake until others confirmed his results.

There was a movement, once its status had been confirmed, to give Slide a name believed to be more fitting for a highest peak. "Mount Lincoln," after the late U.S. president, was considered for a while. But it ended when Guyot announced that he preferred Slide, as he had followed local custom wherever possible in naming the peaks for his survey.

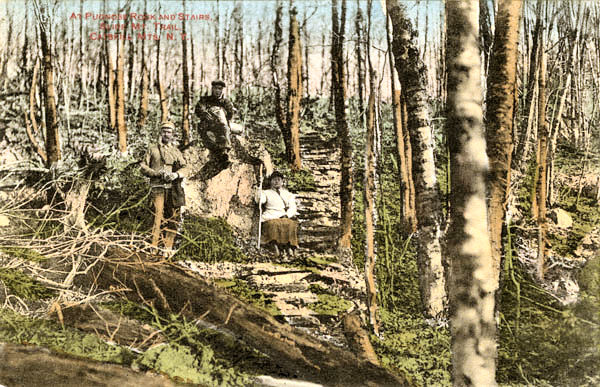
Pugnose Rock on the Steps Trail, Dutcher's original trail up Slide Mountain. Image courtesy of http://www.catskillarchive.com

Legends have grown up over the years in the Catskills over this belated discovery of the range's highest peak. Some tell of a new owner of Hunter Mountain, the range's other 4,000-footer and second-highest peak, swinging a level around to ensure he had bought the highest peak until being stopped by Slide. Another story has John Burroughs, who later became rich and famous writing about his hikes up Slide and other nearby mountains, proving the case atop the mountain by having his friends aim a rifle with a ball in the barrel at all other contending peaks and observing that the ball fell out every time.

Regardless, tourism soon shifted to the new highest peak, and a local woodsman, Jim Dutcher, who knew the mountain well from his days peeling hemlock bark for tanning, built a hotel and did a regular business escorting visitors to the summit up a trail he built in 1880. While it runs over privately owned land and has been abandoned since 1941 save for the final section leading across the summit ridge from the west, it still exists and can be followed.

=== Forest Preserve ===
Around the same time, Slide would prove instrumental in creating New York's Forest Preserve as it exists today.

Some of the other private lands near the mountain had been utterly deprived of any value by tanners who had decided to boost their profits by neglecting to pay their property taxes and simply leaving the area. At that time, when the county took possession through foreclosure, it was among those required by the state to guarantee payment of state property taxes.

Many county voters and landowners felt shafted, leading Ulster to refuse to pay despite a court order. Their representatives in Albany worked out a compromise by which the lands in question were given to the state as part of the newly established Forest Preserve, originally meant to include just the Adirondacks, to satisfy the county's unpaid debts to the state. That was the beginning of what ultimately became the Catskill Park.

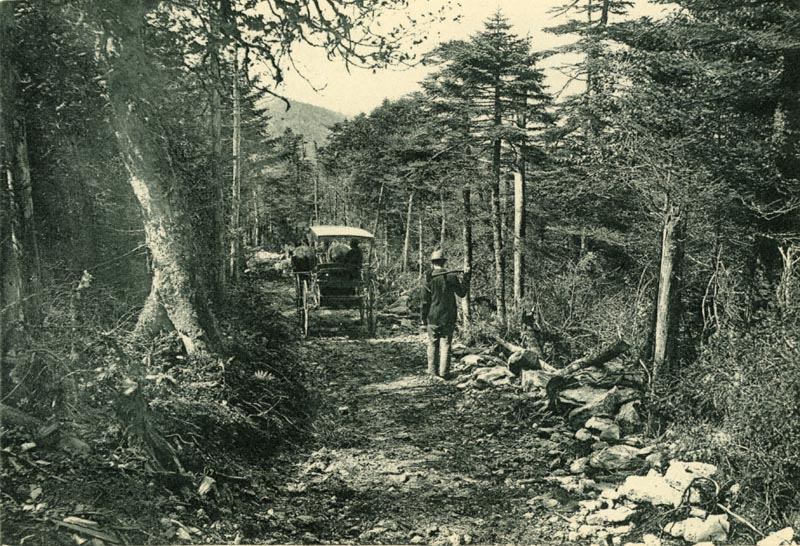
The bridle trail up Slide Mountain, photo by S.R. Stoddard, about 1900

On June 11, 1886, a delegation from the state's forest commission climbed Slide to give some sort of official recognition to the peak and the Catskill Forest Preserve. While they used Dutcher's trail, the man himself did not take part ... in fact, he did no maintenance on the trail beforehand, since he was a Republican and the commissioners had been appointed by Democratic governor David Hill. Nevertheless, the party got to the summit, where Townsend Cox, head of the commission, declared the view as fine as anything to be found in the Adirondacks.

The next year the state decided to use 200 acres (81 hectares) along the West Branch of the Neversink at the west slope of the mountain (south of the current trailhead) to reintroduce white-tailed deer, which had been seriously thinned in the area over the preceding century. A 10-foot (3.0 m) wooden fence was built around the whole area to protect them from poaching, and eventually 95 deer were released back into the wild, successfully re-establishing the species.

Ironically, today there are actually very few deer in that area, because the undisturbed forest no longer offers as much of the second- and third-growth species deer prefer to feed on, and predators such as black bears have become more numerous as well.

The new legislation helped Slide score a significant first in 1892, when the state appropriated $250 to build a trail, paralleling Dutcher's, up the west side of the mountain — the first trail built at public expense in the Forest Preserve. A survey was also authorized to determine whether it was on public land, and even though it was not the trail was built anyway.

While heavily eroded and rocky, it is still in use today as part of the Burroughs Range Trail and remains the most frequently used ascent.

Two years later the Forest Preserve legislation was written into a new version of New York's constitution as Article 14.

=== John Burroughs ===
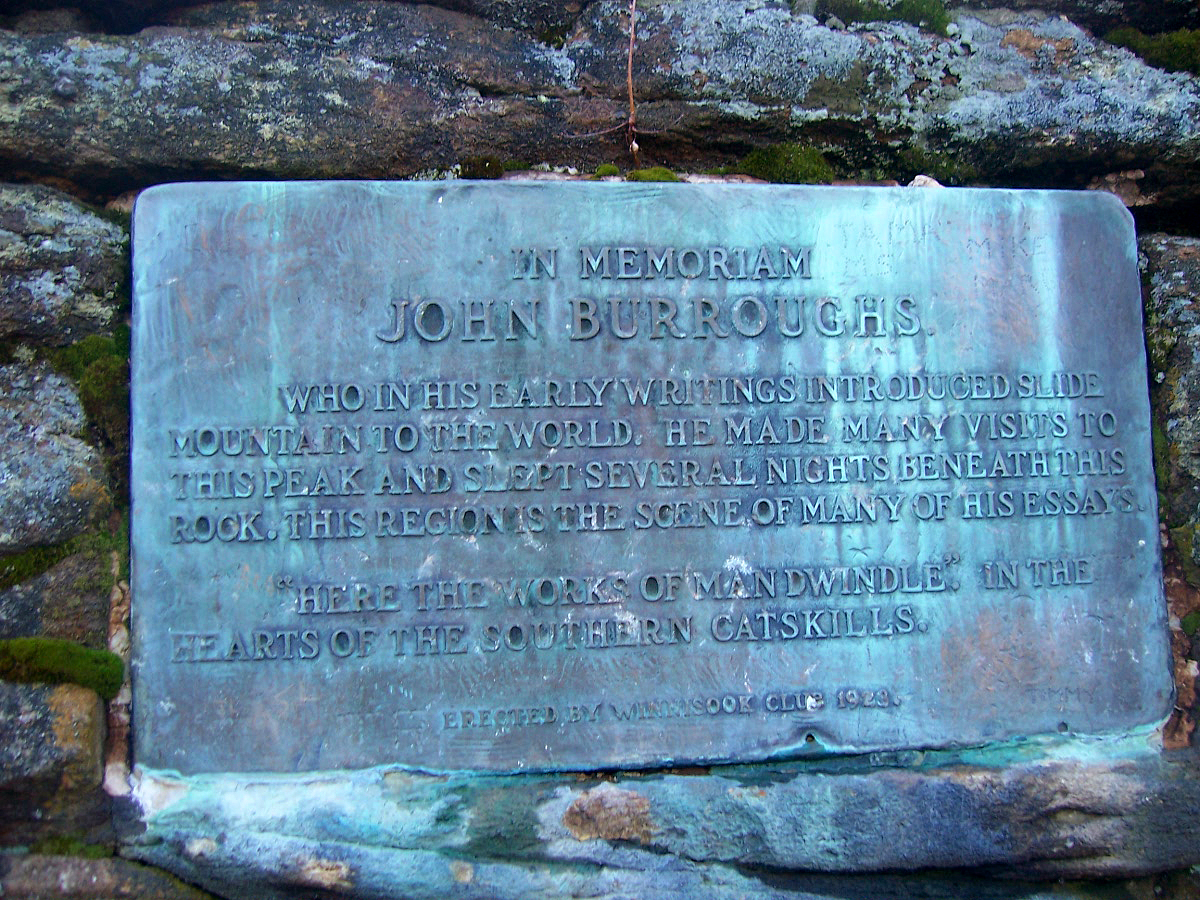
Plaque in memory of John Burroughs near summit

Slide's fame was spread far and wide by Burroughs. He had often been able to see the peak's summit ridge from Old Clump Mountain near his boyhood home in Delaware County, likening it to seeing a horse grazing from behind.

He tried to climb the mountain several times with friends, and his account of his successful ascent from nearby Woodland Valley, "The Heart of the Southern Catskills," is one of his best works. He wrote of the view from the summit:

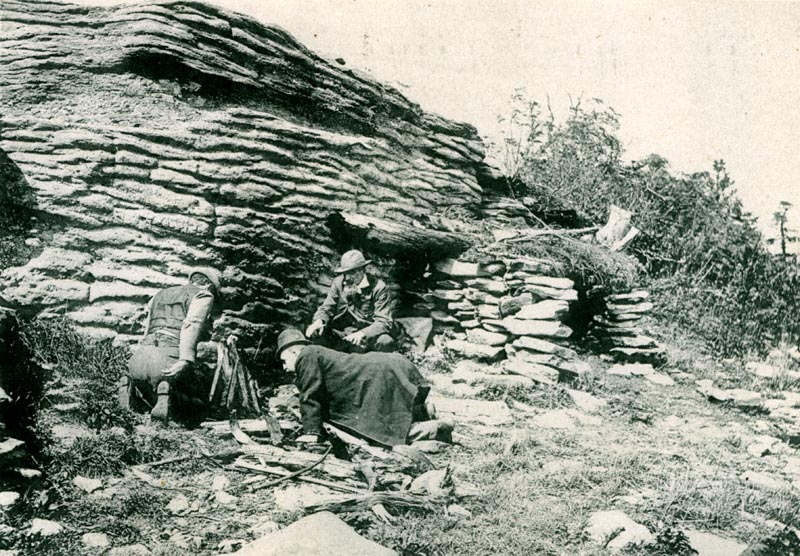
Camping at the summit rock around 1900. On several occasions, Burroughs spent the night in the small stone shelter at the base of the rock.

We saw the world as the hawk or the balloonist sees it when he is three thousand feet in the air. How soft and flowing all the outlines of the hills and mountains beneath us looked! The forests dropped down and undulated away over them, covering them like a carpet ...

All was mountain and forest on every hand. Civilization seemed to have done little more than to have scratched this rough, shaggy surface of the earth here and there. In any such view, the wild, the aboriginal, the geographical greatly predominate. The works of man dwindle, and the original features of the huge globe come out. Every single object or point is dwarfed; the valley of the Hudson is only a wrinkle in the earth's surface. You discover with a feeling of surprise that the great thing is the earth itself, which stretches away on every hand so far beyond your ken.

"Here the works of man dwindle," was put on a plaque near the summit by the Winnisook Club shortly after his death in 1921 and placed on a ledge near the summit that offers the best view from the mountain. It has since been known as Burroughs Ledge.

=== Eugene Bicknell ===
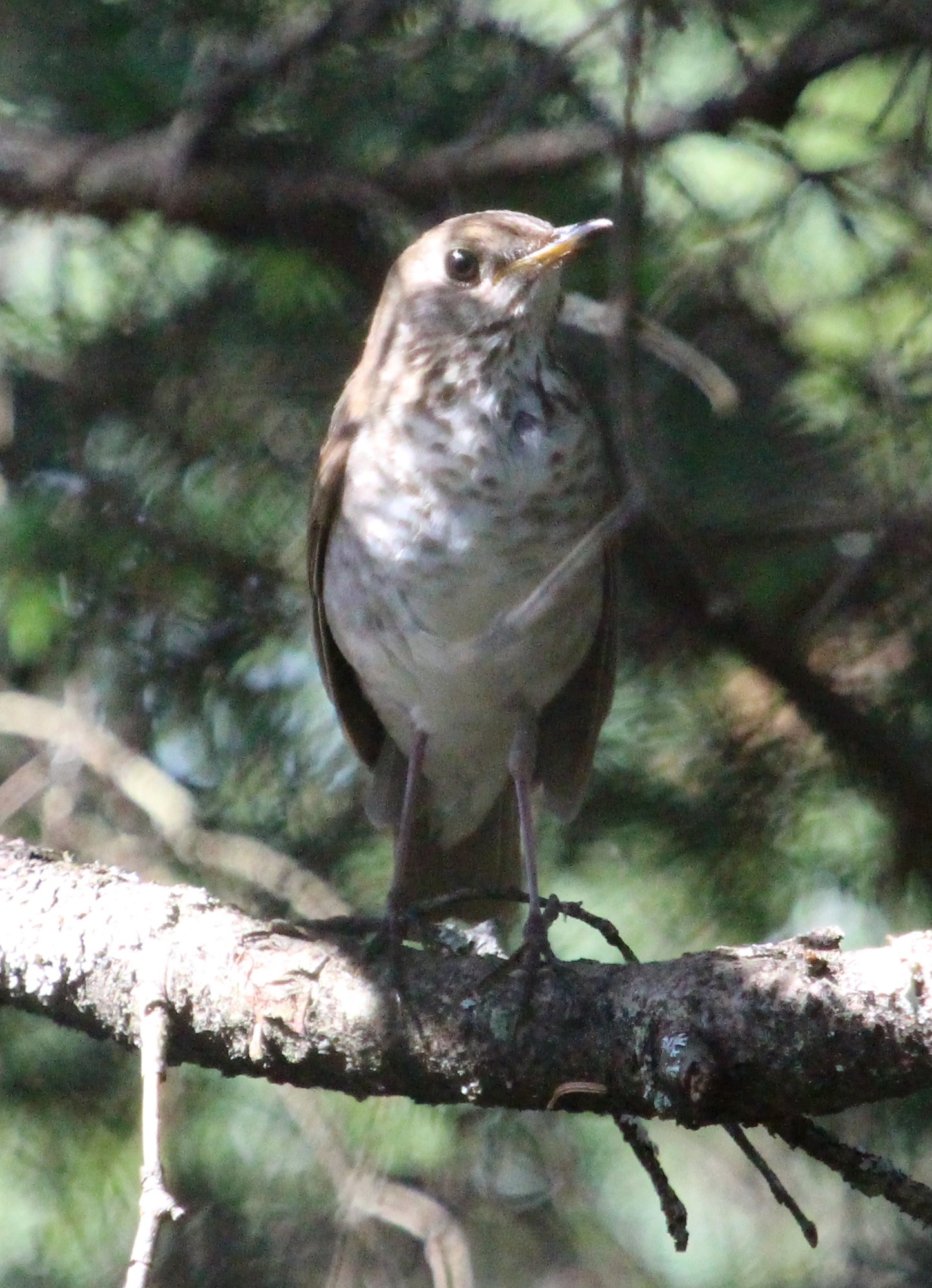
A Bicknell's thrush

Another early visitor to the mountain was an amateur ornithologist from Brooklyn named Eugene Bicknell. On one of those days, he caught a small brown thrush near the summit which he was unable to identify as belonging to any known species of that time.

The bird was named Slide Mountain thrush at first, then Bicknell's thrush when it was found living high up in the boreal forests of other Northeastern mountains. But it was not studied, as prevailing scientific opinion of the time considered it a subspecies of the gray-cheeked thrush. Only in the late 20th century did newer research methods such as DNA comparisons prove that it was, indeed, a separate species, setting off a scramble to save habitat and learn as much as possible about it.

=== Early 20th century ===
The trail built in 1892 had been meant to facilitate travel to the lookout towers that existed in some form or another on the mountain's summit. Recreational visitors found views from the summit severely limited without a stand to get above the trees; the state was interested in fire control.

Despite the peak's importance in establishing the Forest Preserve in the Catskills, much of the land remained in private hands. While purchases in 1900 did much to change that, it would take until 1928 before the state actually acquired the summit property and much of the land it had already built a trail on.

During World War II, a small military training plane crashed on the mountain's east slope at about 3,620 feet (1,100 m). While most of the debris is gone, the site can still be reached via a short side path from the Burroughs Range Trail.

=== Fire lookout tower ===
The first fire lookout structure built on the mountain was a wooden tower. The site was operational in 1912, at which time the site was deemed unsuitable for fire lookout operations and later officially closed in 1916. In 1934, a 35-foot-tall (11 m) steel tower was built on the mountain, but was never used for fire lookout purposes. The tower later deteriorated and was removed in 1968.

=== Wilderness area ===
In the mid-1960s, the formal organization of the Catskill Mountain 3500 Club, the range's first peak bagging organization, gave more hikers a reason to climb the mountain as they were required to do so at least twice, once in wintertime and once during the rest of the year, for membership.

Around the same time, the Long Path was also routed over the mountain when it was finally established as a marked trail rather than a collection of points of interest. The summit is still the highest point on the entire trail.

A major change in management of the mountain occurred in the mid-1970s, after the state's Conservation Commission had become the Department of Environmental Conservation and the Temporary Commission on the Future of the Catskills had recommended that it establish a master plan for all the Catskill lands. Slide would wind up lending its name to the state-designated Slide Mountain Wilderness Area, the largest in the Catskills at 47,500 acres (192 km^{2}). New regulations also ended abuse of the summit by campers.

For many years, the first two miles (3.2 km) or so of the trail climbing Slide crossed the property of the nearby Winnisook Club. There was a metal gate across the Burroughs Range Trail marking the property line, below which nearly every tree had a No Trespassing sign on it. Because of the 1970s hiking boom, parking along the road at Winnisook Lake (there was no parking lot) had become a nightmare. In the late 1970s, the New York State Department of Environmental Conservation solved the problem by buying the land south of the ridgeline from the Winnisook Club, making all but the last stretch of trail to Winnisook Lake public land. Then, in its first-ever Unit Management Plan for the wilderness area, they built a new parking lot further south down Ulster County Road 47 and relocated the trail onto the new public land, ending at the new parking lot. This was the trailhead for a new section of the Phoenicia-East Branch Trail, which connected to the carriage road commonly used very near the base of the Burroughs Range Trail.

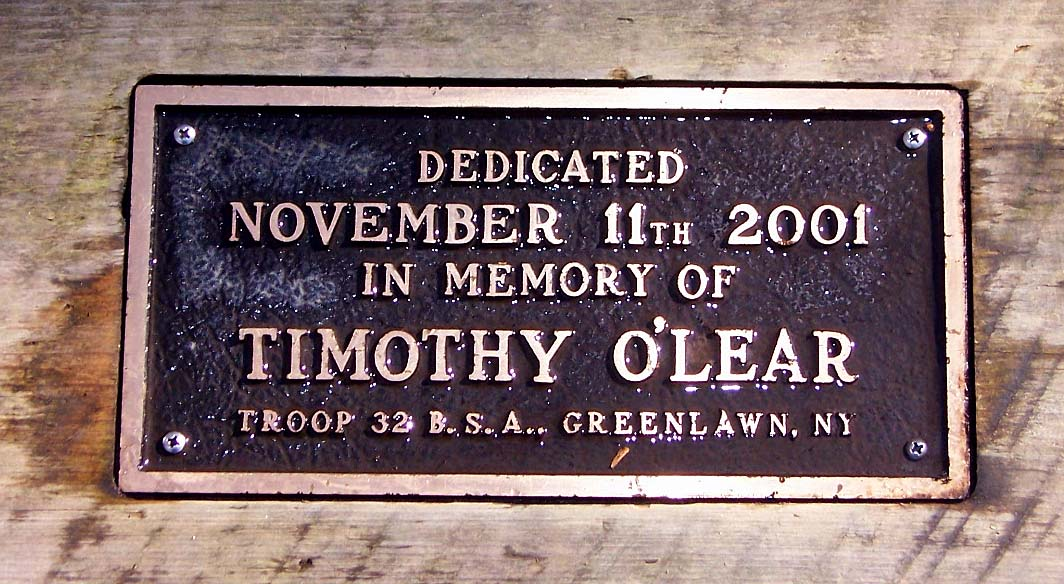
Plaque memorializing Timothy O'Lear near trailhead

This new section requires crossing the west branch of the Neversink right at the beginning. While it is normally not difficult to follow the stepping stones, the creek can be impassable and even fatal in high water. In December 2000, Timothy O'Lear, a Boy Scout from Long Island drowned when he fell in and was caught under some nearby tree branches when returning after a weekend backpacking trip. He is memorialized with a small plaque on a bench at the beginning of the trail.

In 2023 a family from New Jersey was ticketed by a DEC forest ranger after they brought several homemade Adirondack chairs to the summit, assembled and left them there, with the intent that people could sit on them and enjoy the views. They were told by two volunteers from the 3500 Club that doing so was illegal under state regulations governing wilderness areas. A DEC forest ranger met them on their descent and told them to return to the summit and remove the chairs. After they refused to do so, they were issued a ticket carrying a fine as high as $325. The ranger and another volunteer removed the chairs.

== Natural environment ==
=== Forest ===
Slide's slopes are covered with a typical Catskills ridge hardwood forest of various maple species, yellow birch and beech at lower elevations and a boreal forest composed predominantly of balsam fir at higher elevations. Paper birch can be found where the two forests begin to change over.

Catskill forest researcher Michael Kudish has found an anomalous grove of sugar maple at roughly 3,900 feet (1,200 m) in elevation just off the trail near the western end of the mountain's summit ridge.

He has also noted that, in contrast to the boreal forests on other Catskill High Peaks, Slide's has no red spruce. He does not believe there ever has been any. There are some groves and isolated individual trees on lower elevations on the mountain.

=== Geology ===
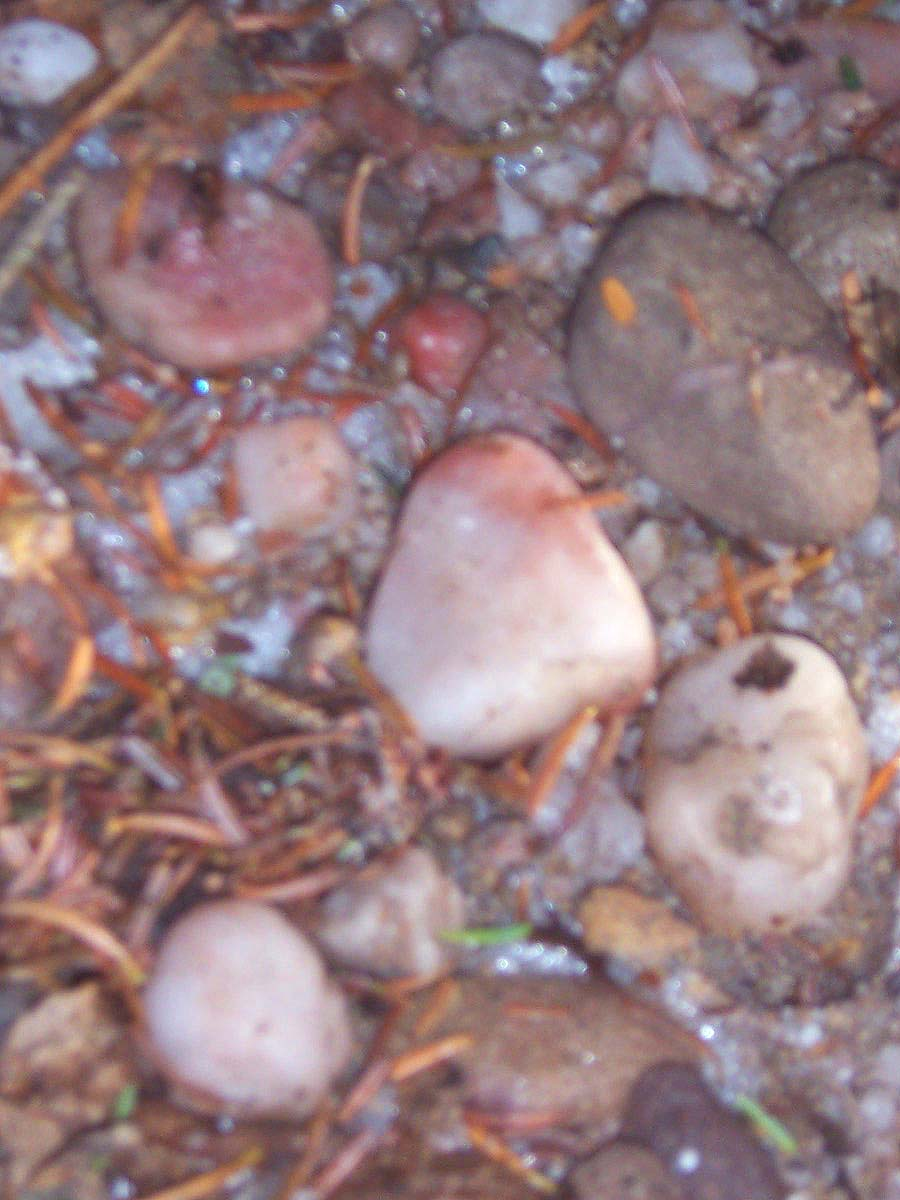
Detail of quartz pebbles along trail near summit

One of the mountain's more curious features is the white quartz pebbles found on the trail along the summit ridge, which lend it something of a garden-path feel.

These are found nowhere else in the Catskills, and since it is likely that they would not have survived the Wisconsin glaciation, it has been speculated that Slide's summit may have been a nunatak during that time, protruding above the ice which buried all the other peaks. However, one researcher reportedly found striation marks on rocks along the summit ridge, suggesting that glaciers did indeed cover the summit. Those marks have eroded over time, however, becoming more difficult to confirm, and the consensus now is that they may have been left instead by glaciers during the Illinoian Stage prior to the Wisconsin Stage.

== Approaches ==
Trailed and trailless routes exist to the summit. To protect the higher-elevation forests, DEC regulations prohibit camping above 3,500 feet (1,100 m) anywhere on Forest Preserve land in the Catskills except between December 21 and March 21. Open fires are banned in those areas all year round.

=== Trails ===
Three trails combine to create three possible approaches to the mountain, although only one crosses the summit.

==== Burroughs Range Trail from the west ====
The most common route up Slide has always been from the pass between it and the mountains to the west, where the high elevation at the trailhead has greatly reduced the vertical ascent required. The move from Winnisook Lake to the new state trailhead has added to the climb slightly, but it is still less than that required to climb some of the lower Catskill High Peaks.

After crossing the upper west branch of the Neversink at the trailhead, 2,400 feet (730 m) in elevation, the yellow-blazed P-EB trail works its way gently up slope and over some lesser streams 0.7 miles (1.1 km) to the old carriage road it originally followed through the Winnisook Club property. It follows this south past a reliable spring 0.3 miles (480 m) to the western terminus of the red-blazed Burroughs Range Trail, the old horse trail built in 1892.

This works its way steadily up Slide's southwest ridge for about a mile to the summit ridge, where boreal forest takes over and it abruptly turns to the north, then west again to follow the north side of the summit ridge. Shortly after this latter turn, the old Dutcher Trail, marked by very faded orange blazes, comes in from the north. The remainder of this section, where the treadway lies heavy with the white quartz pebbles, is the trail Dutcher built and used in his day.

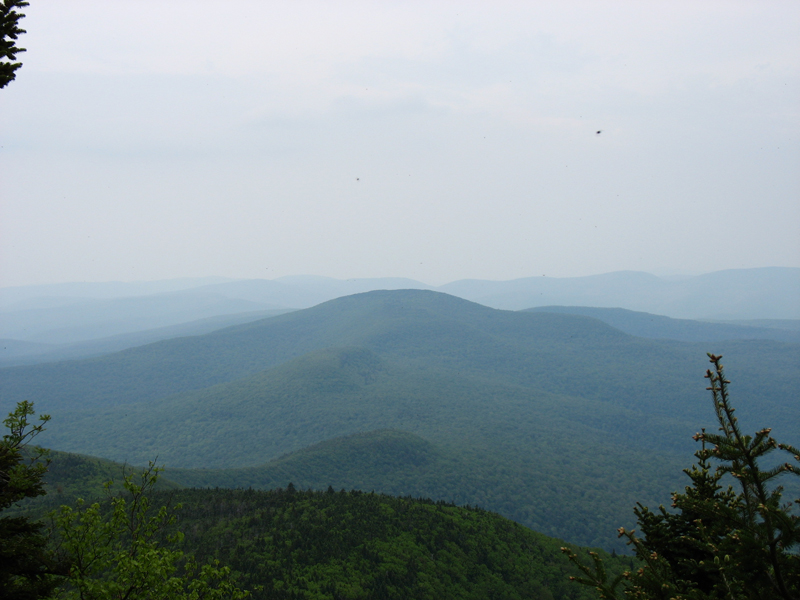
From bottom, Slide's north ridge, Giant Ledge and Panther Mountain from the north overlook near the summit.

An official trail, the Curtis-Ormsbee (see below), soon comes in from the south. At this point the Long Path also joins the trail. From here it is 0.7 miles (1.1 km) to the summit, with views to the north opening up at several points along the way. This includes one just short of the summit, above the top of the slides that give the mountain its name.

Total distance via this route is 2.75 miles (4.43 km), with a vertical ascent of 1,700 feet (520 m).

==== Curtis-Ormsbee Trail ====
Reached from the same starting point, the Curtis-Ormsbee Trail adds more distance to the overall trip but is a favorite with serious hikers since it offers an additional viewpoint and passes through more scenic stretches of forest. It is the route the Long Path takes up the peak.

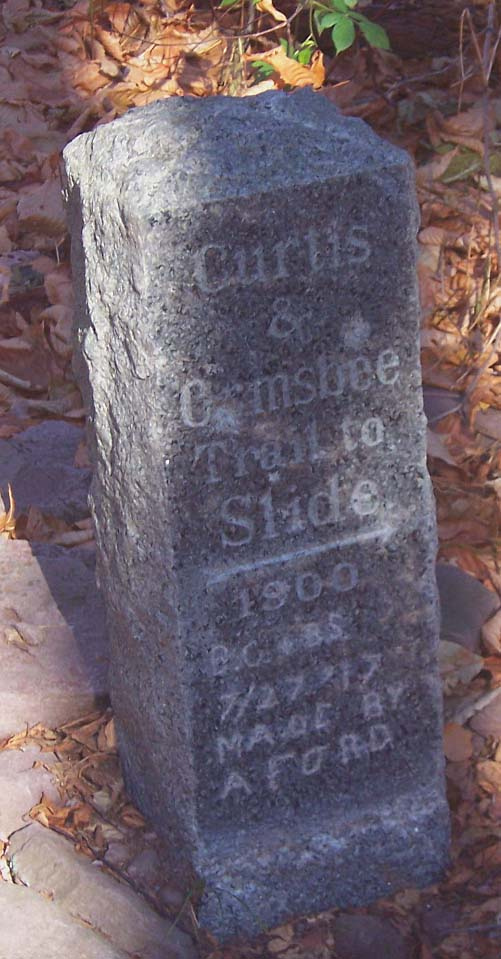
Monument to Curtis and Ormsbee at south end of trail

It is named in memory of William Buckingham Curtis and Allan Ormsbee, two hikers from New York who died in a sudden snowstorm in the Presidential Range of New Hampshire's White Mountains on June 30, 1900. They had laid the trail out, and a small monument to them is located at the trail's southern end, where it leaves the Phoenicia-East Branch Trail 0.8 miles (1.3 km) south of the Burroughs Range Trail junction, in the col between Slide and neighboring Wildcat Mountain.

The blue-blazed trail, 1.6 miles (2.6 km) long follows another ridge up to the junction with the Burroughs Range Trail on the summit ridge. Just above the signs indicating the camping and fire restrictions that NYSDEC has put in place for areas above 3,500 feet (1,100 m) in the Catskills to protect the montane forests, there are two viewpoints just off the trail. One takes in Table and Lone mountains; the other offers the only good glimpse of the lowest High Peak, remote and challenging Rocky Mountain. It continues to the summit through long and fragrant stretches of balsam fir and soil muddy enough to require puncheon bridges in some areas.

It is 4.1 miles (6.6 km) to the summit via this route. Many hikers make a loop of the trip if time permits, ascending via the Curtis-Ormsbee Trail and returning down the Burroughs Range Trail, a total trip of 6.85 miles (11.02 km).

The beginning of the Curtis-Ormsbee Trail can also be reached by using the Long Path approach and coming from the southern end of the Phoencia-East Branch Trail, 2.95 miles (4.75 km) away in the town of Denning. Vertical rise to the summit via this route is almost 2,000 feet (610 m), and the total distance to the summit is 6.25 miles (10.06 km).

==== Burroughs Range Trail from the east ====
The most challenging route to the summit of Slide begins at the Burroughs Range Trail's eastern terminus, Woodland Valley State Campground south of Phoenicia. It takes in the whole range, going over Wittenberg and Cornell mountains for a 7-mile (11 km), 2,700-foot (820 m) ascent. Wittenberg and Cornell are both challenging climbs in and of themselves, and the climax is the steep 900-foot (270 m) east slope of Slide.

It is not surprising that this is often done as an overnight backpacking trip, since the long col between Slide and Cornell features a spruce grove that is an excellent place to camp, and the state has accordingly designated several sites in that area. Some hikers, though, have been able to get to the summit of Slide and back to Woodland Valley in a single lengthy day, often by descending to the western trailhead and following the Phoenicia-East Branch trail back down, a grand loop of 13.95 miles (22.45 km).

=== Bushwhacks ===
Two approaches that are at least partially trailless have been used by those seeking greater challenges.

==== The north ridge ====
The ridge leading down from the summit to the col with Giant Ledge to the north is an obvious route. DEC had, at one point, planned a trail up it but the idea was dropped when hikers and hunters objected and the route was judged too environmentally fragile to support a trail.

It can be used by starting from the Giant Ledge trailhead at a hairpin turn on County Road 42, about 2,200 feet (670 m) in elevation. It is 0.65 miles (1.05 km) to the junction with the blue-blazed Fox Hollow Trail, which leads north to Giant Ledge and Panther Mountain. By striking out due south from this junction one will soon begin to climb the north ridge, reaching first a 3,620-foot (1,100 m) summit (on the private property of the Winnisook Club), then turning to the southeast through thickening boreal forest to the 3,800-foot (1,200 m) summit. From there the narrow, thickly forested ridge is followed steeply up to the summit ridge and the Burroughs Range Trail, about 0.25 miles (400 m) from the summit.

==== East Branch of the Neversink ====
A long route following the east branch of the Neversink up to the ridge connecting Slide and Cornell. Often taken on multi-day trips, with attempts on the range of trail-less peaks to Slide's southeast.

Starting from the Denning trailhead, the P-EB Trail is followed 1.1 miles (1.8 km) to its junction with the blue-blazed Peekamoose-Table Trail, which drops down to the east 0.35 miles (560 m) into the river valley near the flood plain at the Deer Shanty Brook confluence and its many channels, some of them difficult to cross at high water. After one of the last, alert eyes can find the beginning of the "Fisherman's Path," an unofficial trail following the East Branch far upstream into the wildest country in the Catskills.

It takes some skill to follow this trail, as red paint blazes that sometimes appear are often painted out by DEC forest rangers (there are, however, some official campsites along its length) and while it is sometimes wide and obvious it is not always, and switches sides of the river several times.

Further upstream, as it passes the usual points of departure for Lone, Rocky, Balsam Cap and Friday mountains, the path gets increasingly disused and harder to follow. The challenge in hiking Slide this way is not so much the mountain itself as the routefinding when it begins to climb to the col.

==== Deer Shanty Brook ====
The most challenging trailless route is the seldom-attempted approach up this tributary of the East Branch. It begins identically to that route but involves leaving the trail at that crossing and eventually following the brook to the slopes of Slide to the southeast. There is no trail whatsoever through this country and the boreal forest on this part of the mountain itself is reportedly difficult to penetrate, even by the standards of other peaks in the vicinity.

== Summit ==
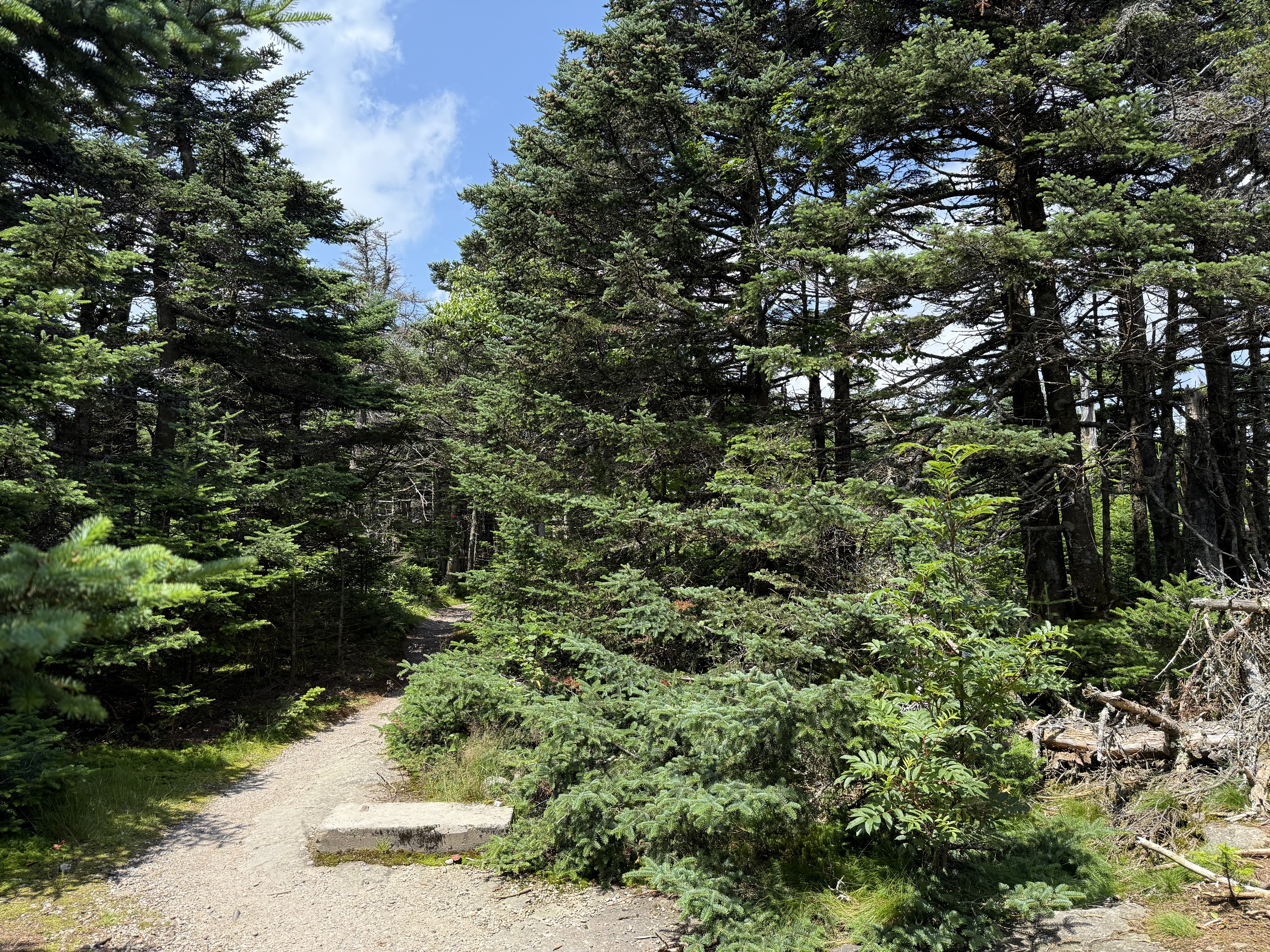
Actual summit, with tower footing on lower left

The mountain's actual height of land is a small, viewless clearing with the footings of the towers that once stood there.

Just to the east, however, used to be the much wider clearing of Burroughs Ledge with a sweeping view to the east in which Ashokan Reservoir was prominent, the Kingston-Rhinecliff Bridge used to be glimpsed. This view is now completely overgrown. The neighboring high peaks to the east used to be able to be seen, and seemed like small hills and the Devil's Path and Blackhead Range in Greene County used to be visible to the north. In fact, it used to be possible to see, from various points along the summit ridge, all but one of the other 34 Catskill High Peaks (Thomas Cole may or may not have been hidden by Hunter).

At one time the view was very expansive, but since camping on the summit is now banned except during winter and in emergencies, the balsam fir has grown back in around the edges of the clearing, giving the area a more natural look. Close inspection, in fact, can find remnants of the two lean-tos that once stood here before 1975 when camping was permitted. There is also a spring 0.25 miles (400 m) down the trail to the east.

On June 15, 1985, the summit received its most visitors ever at a single time when at least a hundred hikers, nature lovers and DEC officials gathered there to commemorate the centennial of the Forest Preserve. Similar traffic was recorded in 2004 when the Catskill Park itself reached a similar milestone.

=== Towers ===
The lack of an unobstructed 360-degree view from Slide has led, over the years, to several observation towers being built at the summit.

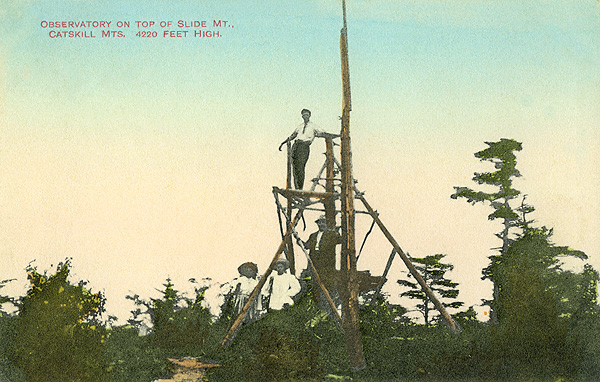
Observation tower on Slide Mountain, from a postcard postmarked in 1913 (the image is probably much older)

Dutcher probably built a crude one out of balsam logs, since Burroughs refers to its presence in his writings. It was still there in 1900 when another visitor recorded it.

The state wanted to take advantage of the mountain's height for fire control purposes, and in 1911 built a more permanent fire lookout and observer's cabin on the summit. But it would only be occupied and used for the next year, then abandoned again.

Steel for a more permanent tower was brought up to the summit in the early 1930s, but the tower itself was not built until wartime. It would be dismantled around 1965, and no replacement has been erected.

In the late 1990s, when DEC updated the Slide Mountain Wilderness Area's Unit Management Plan, it considered rebuilding an observation tower at the summit to provide the long-absent views. However, despite the historical precedent, wilderness area values governing DEC policy that were in place at the time led to the idea being rejected during the planning process.

== See also ==
- List of the most isolated major summits of North America
- List of mountain peaks of North America
  - List of mountain peaks of the United States
