= Balsam Cap =

Mountain in New York, United States

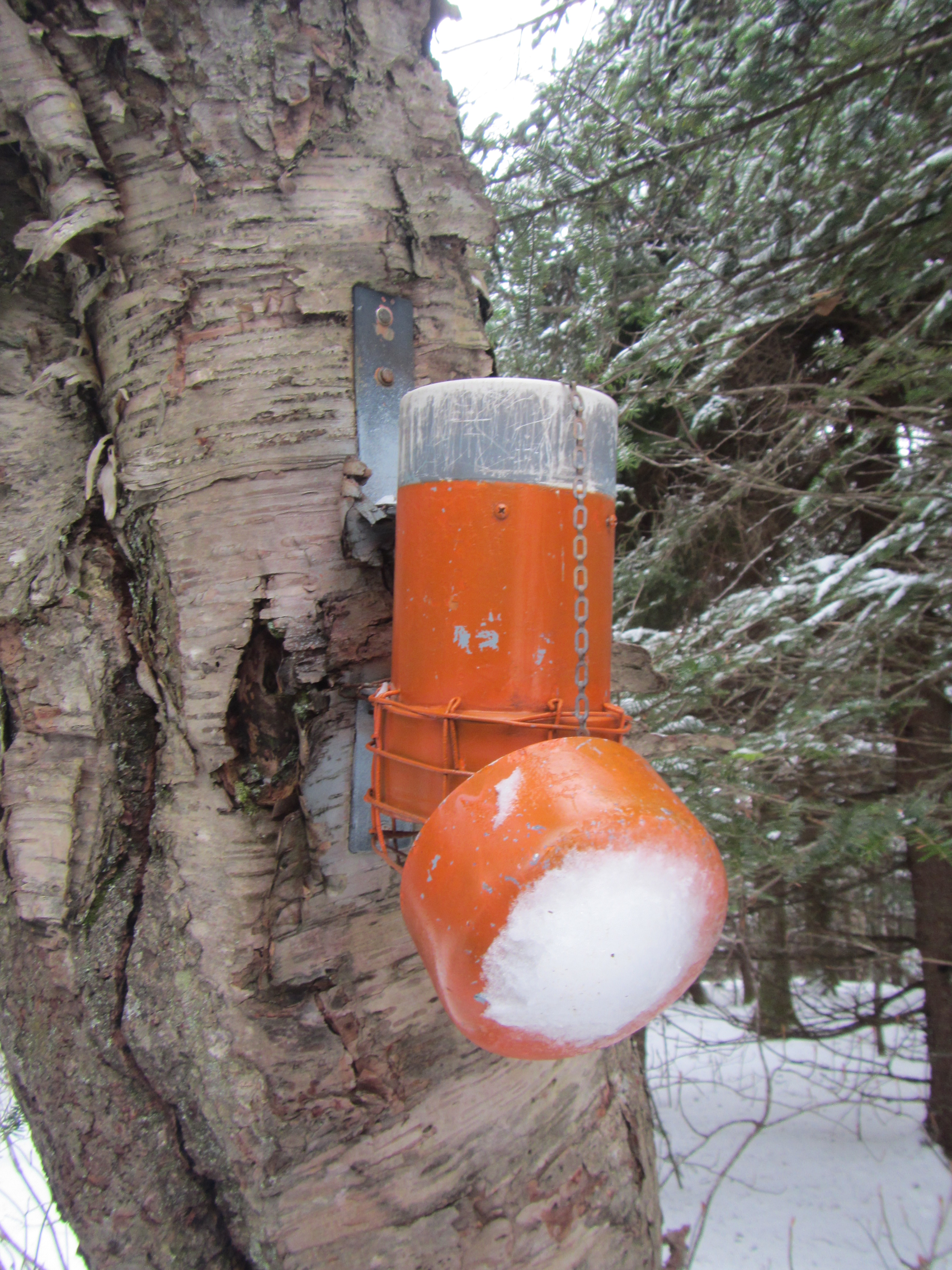
- Summit canister on Balsam Cap

Highest point
- Elevation: 3,623 ft (1,104 m) NGVD 29
- Prominence: 243 ft (74 m)
- Listing: Catskill High Peaks 24th
- Coordinates: 41°58′37″N 74°21′27″W

Geography
- Location within New York Location within the United States
- Location: Shandaken, Ulster County, New York
- Parent range: Catskill Mountains
- Topo map: USGS West Shokan

Balsam Cap is a mountain located in Ulster County, New York. The mountain is part of the Catskill Mountains. Balsam Cap is flanked to the north by Friday Mountain, and to the southwest by Rocky Mountain.

The northeast and southeast slopes of Balsam Cap drain into Maltby Hollow Brook, thence into Bush Kill, the Ashokan Reservoir, Esopus Creek, the Hudson River, and into New York Bay. The southwest side of Balsam Cap drains into the headwaters of Rondout Creek, thence into the Hudson River. The northwest side of Balsam Cap drains into the East Branch of the Neversink River, the Delaware River, and into Delaware Bay.

Balsam Cap is within the Slide Mountain Wilderness of New York's Catskill State Park.

== See also ==
- List of mountains in New York
