= Cornell Mountain =

Mountain located in Ulster County, New York

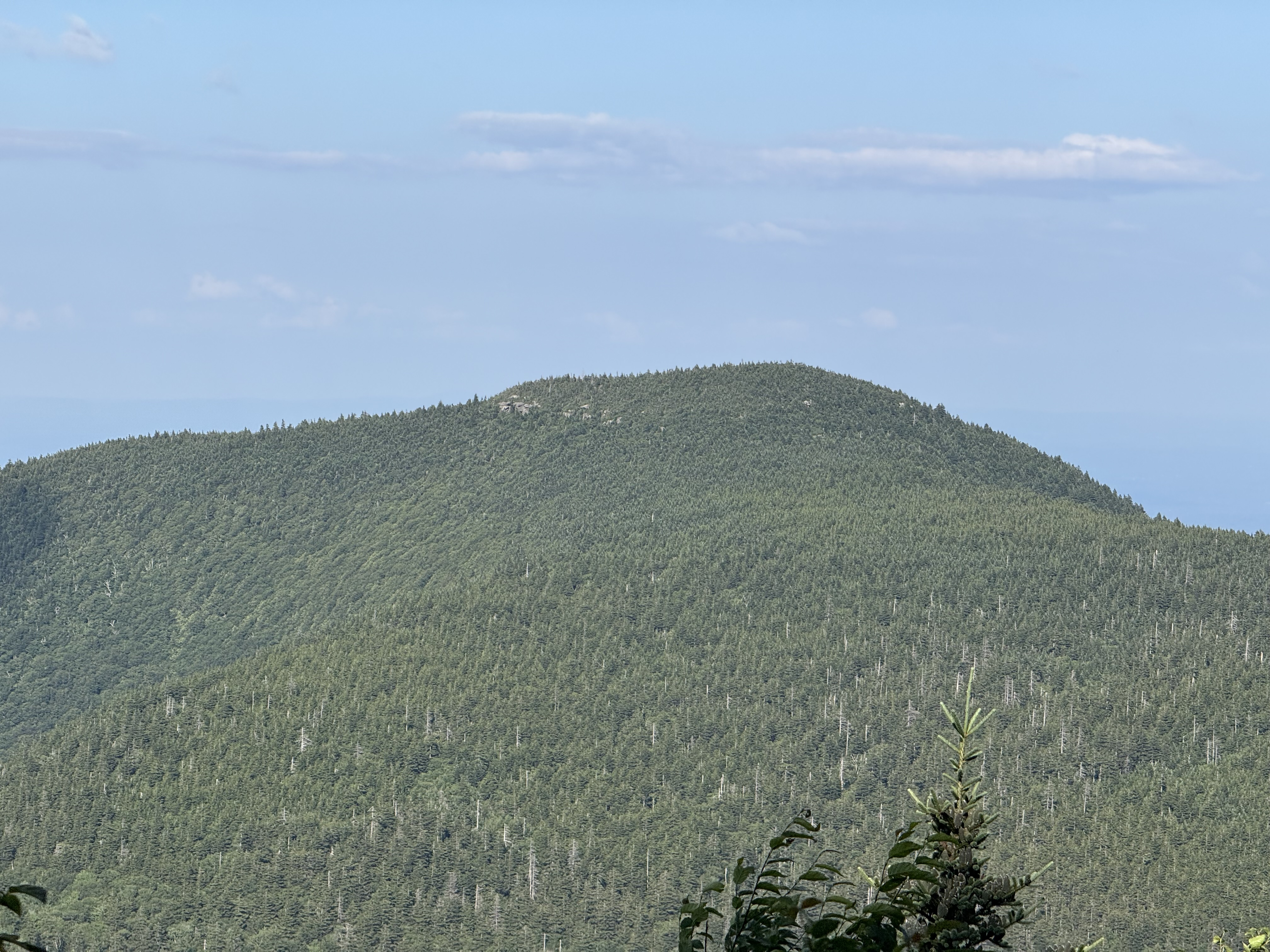
- View of Cornell Mountain from Slide Mountain

Highest point
- Elevation: 3860+ feet (1177+ m) NGVD 29
- Prominence: 600 ft (180 m)
- Listing: Catskill High Peaks 9th
- Coordinates: 42°00′05″N 74°21′25″W

Geography
- Location within New York Location within the United States
- Location: Shandaken, Ulster County, New York
- Parent range: Burroughs Range
- Topo map: USGS Phoenicia

Cornell Mountain is a mountain located in Shandaken, Ulster County, New York. The mountain is part of the Burroughs Range of the Catskill Mountains. Cornell Mountain is flanked to the northeast by Wittenberg Mountain, to the southwest by Friday Mountain, and to the west by 4,180-foot (1,270 m) Slide Mountain — the highest peak in the Catskills.

The northwest side of Cornell Mountain drains into Woodland Creek, thence into Esopus Creek, the Hudson River, and into New York Bay. The east and southeast sides of Cornell Mtn. drain into the Wittenberg Brook, thence into Maltby Hollow Brook, Bush Kill, and Esopus Creek. The southwest side of Cornell Mtn. drains into the headwaters of the east branch of the Neversink River, thence into the Delaware River, and into Delaware Bay.

Cornell Mountain is within the Slide Mountain Wilderness of New York's Catskill State Park. The Long Path, a 350-mile (560 km) long-distance hiking trail from New York City to Albany, is contiguous with the section of the Burroughs Range Trail crossing the summits of Slide, Cornell, and Wittenberg. Cornell Mountain is one of the 35 peaks in the Catskills greater than 3,500 feet elevation, and is a required ascent for membership in the Catskill Mountain 3500 Club.

== See also ==
- Catskill High Peaks
- List of mountains in New York
