= Burroughs Range =

Mountain in New York, United States

- Location within New York Location within the United States Location within the United States

Highest point
- Elevation: 4,180 feet (1,270 m)
- Coordinates: 42°00′30″N 74°20′52″W, 41°59′55″N 74°23′09″W, 41°59′50″N 74°21′59″W

Geography
- Location: Shandaken, Ulster County, New York, U.S.
- Topo map: USGS Phoenicia

The Burroughs Range is a small mountain range in Shandaken, Ulster County, New York. A sub-range of the Catskill Mountains, it consists of Slide Mountain, the highest peak in the Catskills, Cornell Mountain and Wittenberg Mountain. The range was named for John Burroughs, a nature essayist whose forte was the observation of nature with accompanying poetical or philosophical commentary. Romer Mountain is located northeast and Friday Mountain is located south of Burroughs Range.
