= Rocky Mountain (Ulster County, New York) =

Mountain in New York, United States

- Location within New York Location within the United States

Highest point
- Elevation: 3,508 feet (1,069 m)
- Prominence: 320 ft (100 m)
- Listing: Catskill High Peaks 35th
- Coordinates: 41°58.36′N 74°22.39′W

Geography
- Location: Shandaken, Ulster County, New York
- Parent range: Catskill Mountains
- Topo map: USGS West Shokan

Rocky Mountain is a mountain located in Ulster County, New York. The mountain is part of the Catskill Mountains. Rocky Mountain is flanked to the west by Lone Mountain, and to the northeast by Balsam Cap.

The south and east sides of Rocky Mountain drain into the headwaters of Rondout Creek, thence into the Hudson River, and into New York Bay. The northeast and northwest sides of Rocky Mtn. drain into the East Branch of the Neversink River, the Delaware River, and into Delaware Bay.

Rocky Mountain is one of the 35 peaks in the Catskills greater than 3,500 feet elevation, and is a required ascent for membership in the Catskill Mountain 3500 Club. The ascent involves bushwhacking as there is no trail to the summit. Rocky Mountain is within the Slide Mountain Wilderness of New York's Catskill State Park.

== See also ==
- List of mountains in New York
