= Wittenberg Mountain =

Mountain in the United States

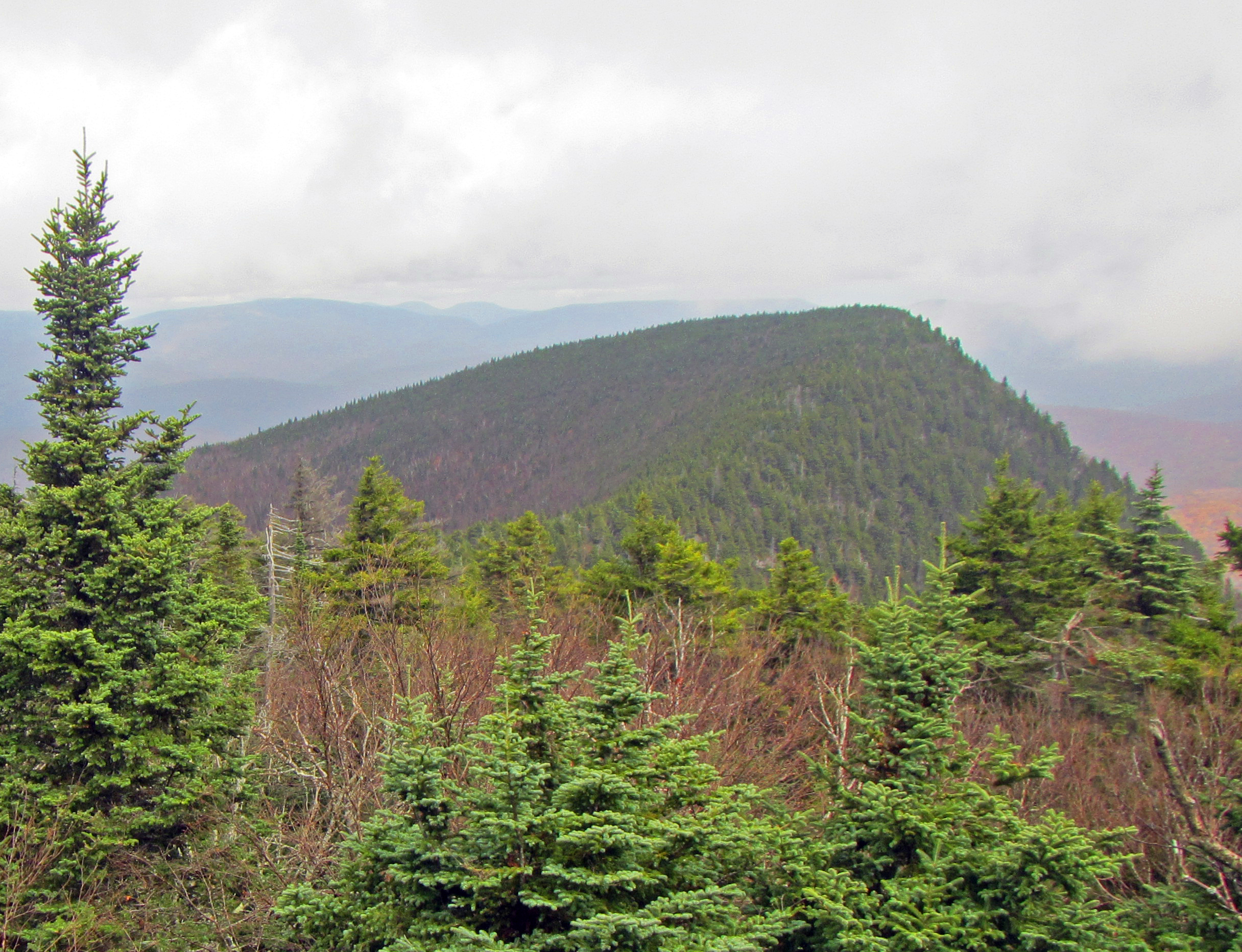
- Wittenberg from near the summit of neighboring Cornell Mountain

Highest point
- Elevation: 3780+ ft (1152+ m) NGVD 29
- Prominence: 200 ft (61 m)
- Listing: Catskill High Peaks 14th
- Coordinates: 42°00′29″N 74°20′51″W

Geography
- Location within New York Location within the United States
- Location: Shandaken, Ulster County, New York
- Parent range: Burroughs Range
- Topo map: USGS Phoenicia

Geology
- Rock age: Late Devonian
- Mountain type(s): Pyramidal peak, with roche moutonnée summit

Wittenberg Mountain, locally "the Wittenberg'', is a mountain in Shandaken, Ulster County, New York. It is part of the Burroughs Range of the Catskill Mountains. Wittenberg is flanked to the southwest by Cornell Mountain and to the northeast by Terrace Mountain.

Wittenberg Mountain is within the watershed of Esopus Creek, which drains into the Hudson River and New York Bay. The northwest and northeast slopes of the mountain drain into Woodland Creek, thence into Esopus Creek. The southeast side of Wittenberg drains into Wittenberg Brook, thence into Maltby Hollow Brook, Bush Kill, and Esopus Creek at Ashokan Reservoir.

Wittenberg Mountain is within the Slide Mountain Wilderness of New York's Catskill State Park. The Long Path, a 350-mile (560 km) long-distance hiking trail from New York City to Albany, is contiguous with the section of the Burroughs Range Trail crossing the summits of Slide, Cornell, and Wittenberg. Wittenberg Mountain is one of the 35 peaks in the Catskills greater than 3,500 feet in elevation and is a required ascent for membership in the Catskill Mountain 3500 Club.

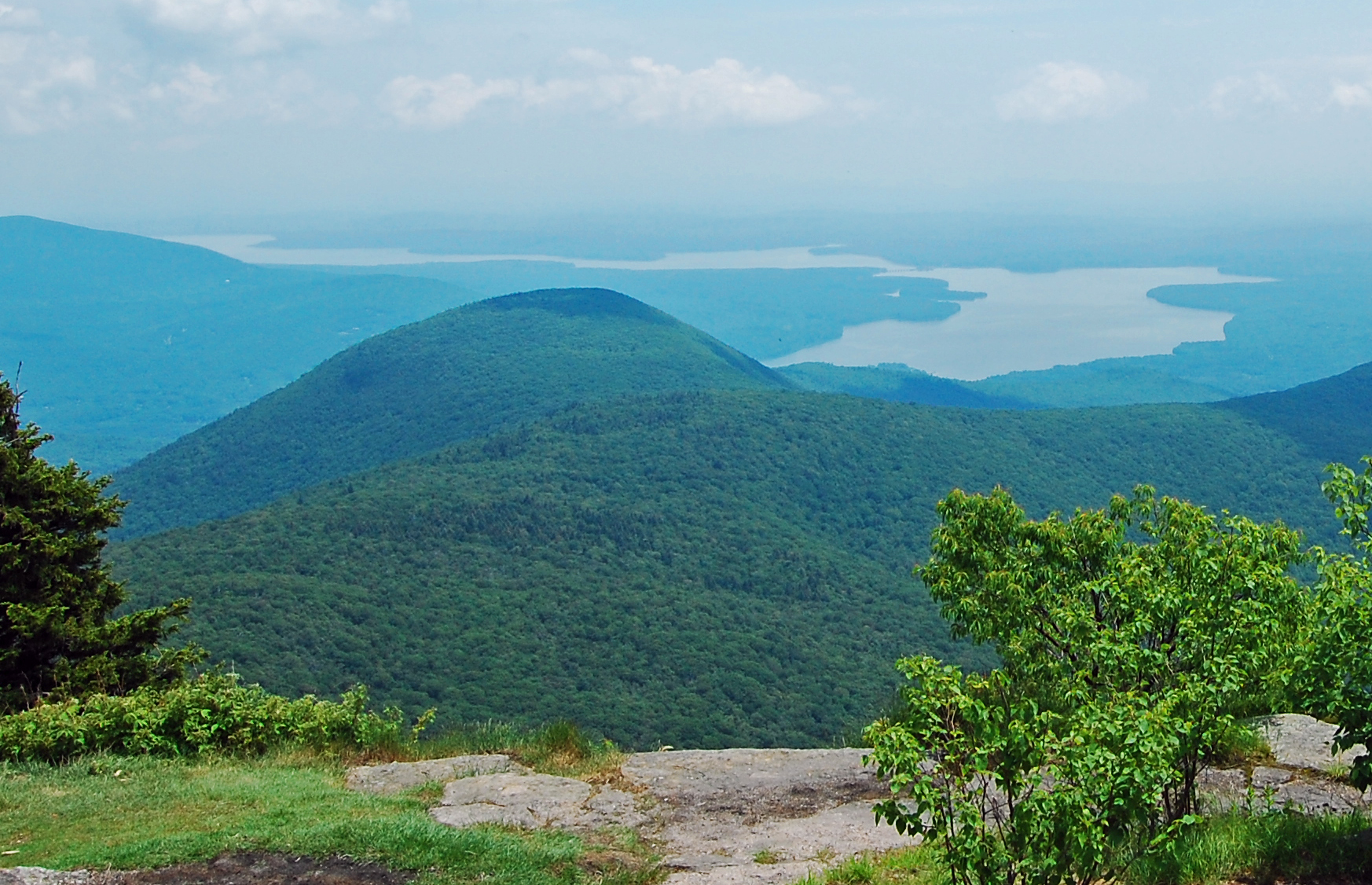
The Ashoken Reservoir seen from the summit of Wittenberg Mountain, with Samuel's Point in the foreground

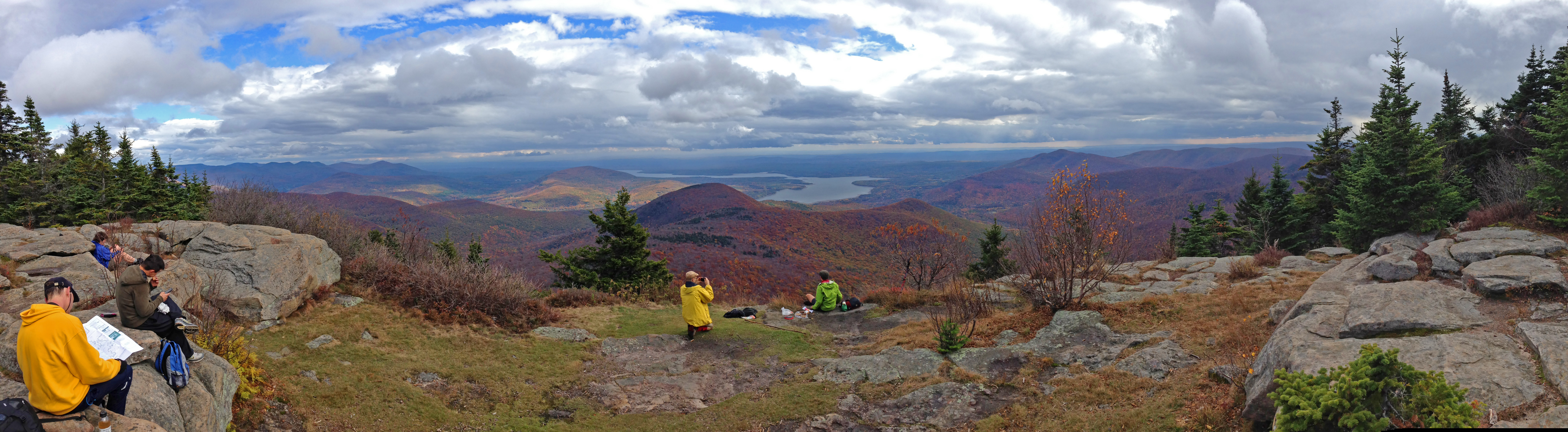
Hikers relaxing on Wittenberg's summit

== See also ==
- List of mountains in New York
