= Friday Mountain =

Mountain in New York, United States

- Location within New York Location within the United States

Highest point
- Elevation: 3,694 ft (1,126 m) NGVD 29
- Prominence: 194 ft (59 m)
- Listing: Catskill High Peaks 20th
- Coordinates: 41°59′15″N 74°21′44″W

Geography
- Location: Shandaken, Ulster County, New York
- Parent range: Catskill Mountains
- Topo map: USGS West Shokan

Friday Mountain, located in Ulster County, New York is part of the Catskill Mountains. It is flanked to the north by Cornell Mountain, and to the south by Balsam Cap.

The southeast side of Friday Mountain drains into Maltby Hollow Brook, thence into Bush Kill, the Ashokan Reservoir, Esopus Creek, the Hudson River, and into New York Bay. The northeast side of Friday Mtn. drains into Wittenberg Brook, thence into Maltby Hollow Brook. The western slopes of Friday Mtn. drain into the headwaters of the East Branch of the Neversink River, thence into the Delaware River, and into Delaware Bay.

Friday Mountain is one of the 35 peaks in the Catskills greater than 3,500 feet elevation, and is a required ascent for membership in the Catskill Mountain 3500 Club. The ascent involves bushwhacking as there is no trail to the summit. Friday Mountain is within the Slide Mountain Wilderness of New York's Catskill State Park.

== See also ==
- List of mountains in New York
