= Lone Mountain (New York) =

Mountain in New York, United States

- Location within New York Location within the United States

Highest point
- Elevation: 3,721 ft (1,134 m)
- Prominence: 281 ft (86 m)
- Listing: Catskill High Peaks 17th
- Coordinates: 41°58′09″N 74°23′22″W

Geography
- Location: Ulster County, New York
- Parent range: Catskill Mountains
- Topo map: USGS Peekamoose Mountain

Lone Mountain is a mountain located in Ulster County, New York. The mountain is part of the Catskill Mountains. Lone Mountain is flanked to the southwest by Table Mountain, and to the east by Rocky Mountain.

The southeast side of Lone Mountain drains into Rondout Creek, thence into the Hudson River, and into New York Bay. The west side of Lone Mtn. drains into Donovan Brook, thence into the East Branch of the Neversink River, the Delaware River, and into Delaware Bay. The north side of Lone Mtn. drains into the East Branch of the Neversink.

Lone Mountain is within the Slide Mountain Wilderness of New York's Catskill State Park.

== See also ==
- List of mountains in New York
