= Catskill Mountain 3500 Club =

US peakbagging club for hikers

- 3500 Club logo, designed by Virginia Smiley
- Formation: 1962; 64 years ago
- Type: Nonprofit
- Tax ID no.: 52-1935612
- Headquarters: West Hurley, New York, United States
- Members: ~4,400
- Official language: English
- Website: catskill-3500-club.org

The Catskill Mountain 3500 Club, incorporated as the Catskill 3500 Club and often just referred to as the 3500 Club, is a peakbagging organization for hikers in the Catskill Mountains of New York. Those wishing to become members must climb the 33 of the 35 Catskill High Peaks currently open to hikers, and, in a departure from the requirements of most other such clubs, climb Slide, Blackhead, Balsam and Panther mountains again in winter, which is defined by the club's by-laws as the period from December 21 to March 21 regardless of the actual occurrences of the winter solstice and vernal equinox in particular years. The club also awards a separate patch for those who go on to climb all peaks during winter.

== Membership ==
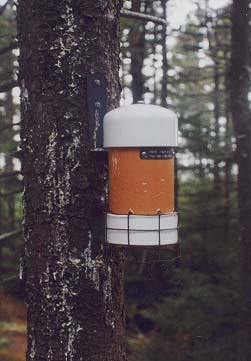
3500 Club summit canister, shown prior to change in color and removal of exterior text requested by NYSDEC.

Members record their climbs on a tally sheet and then submit them to the club's membership chair when they have completed their last required peak. This is mostly done on the honor system; however sometimes the tally sheets are cross-checked against the logs kept in the canisters the club maintains at the summits of the 14 peaks on its list that lack a trail to the summit.

As of April 2024 there are 4,446 regular members and 1,630 winter members. Those who have not yet finished the prescribed 37 climbs (33 regular, four winter) are referred to as aspirants. Members and aspirants alike may subscribe to the quarterly newsletter of the organization, The Catskill Canister, for $10 per annum. In the case of members, this payment additionally represents an annual dues payment; those who are paid up are considered active members. The organization offers lifetime memberships.

== History ==
The Club traces its origins to the early 1950s, when Dan Smiley, a descendant of the founders of Mohonk Mountain House and his fellow birders were trying to track down the elusive Bicknell's thrush, then considered an unimportant subspecies of the gray-cheeked thrush. Since it prefers to mate and spend its summers in cool, shady places like the boreal forests found on the summits of higher mountains in the Northeast, Smiley and his fellow birders drew up a list of the peaks in the Catskills over 3,500 feet and thus likely to have such forestation.

Their goal was not to bag peaks but to find the thrush. Nonetheless, they published their list of (at that time) 33 peaks in a nature journal. Area hikers who saw it began organizing trips to the peaks with an eye toward completing the list, and in 1962 informally organized the club as a Catskill counterpart to the Adirondack Forty-Sixers. Later that year William and Elinore Leavitt of Hudson became the first two members of the club, after newly issued maps resulted in the addition of Friday and Mount Sherrill to the list at the expense of Dry Brook Ridge.

In 1966 the club was formally incorporated, and has counted that year as its founding date ever since. The Leavitts and 23 others who had climbed all the peaks in the meantime were accepted as charter members. Three of the five people who had played important roles in founding the club were, for various reasons, never able to become members; Smiley died with only one climb left for membership.

The peak list would remain in its original form until 1991, when Southwest Hunter Mountain, a trailless peak lacking an official name, was added after a contentious membership vote. It had originally been left off the list due to uncertainty over whether it was really a separate peak or not and the difficulty of establishing where its summit was.

In 2021 the Gould family, which owns the summits of Graham and Doubletop, closed off access to those two peaks due to the impact of greatly increased hiking on the area, particularly after the COVID-19 pandemic had led to an increase in outdoor recreation the year before. The club has advised aspiring members to climb to Doubletop's slightly lower southern summit, on state land, and Mill Brook Ridge in the meantime, and removed the canister from Doubletop. Since then, Doubletop and Graham, eighth and ninth highest in the Catskills, have been dropped from the list, leaving only 33 peaks required for membership.

== Activities ==
The Club sponsors hikes on almost every weekend of the year to the various peaks, and sometimes to other mountains of interest in the Catskills. It is also responsible for maintaining the trail over Peekamoose and Table mountains, and does litter cleanup on the section of Route 214 south of Stony Clove Notch (Both routes are currently part of the Long Path long-distance hiking trail). In the 2000s it assisted in the construction of a relocated lean-to on Balsam Lake Mountain.

Starting with 1966, every spring it holds an annual dinner. Originally held in Kingston, it now takes place at the Ashokan Center in Olivebridge along with its membership meeting, at which new members and winter members from the previous year who are in attendance receive their patches and any matters requiring the vote of the full membership are taken up. It is usually followed by a presentation on some matter of interest concerning the Catskills.

All activities are listed in the club's quarterly newsletter, the Catskill Canister, which also includes poetry, short articles about hiking and the Catskills and news about members.

=== Canister controversy ===
In 1999 the New York State Department of Environmental Conservation, which manages the Catskill lands, proposed in its Unit Management Plan (UMP) for the Slide Mountain Wilderness Area that the club's canisters be removed from the trailless peaks in that unit, arguing that they were not consistent with wilderness values and contributed to degradation of the summits. After an overwhelming response in favor of retaining them, DEC and the Club reached a compromise in the pending update to the Catskill Park State Land Master Plan (CPSLMP) in which DEC would take over ownership of the canisters, the names of mountains would be removed from the exteriors and the canisters themselves repainted a dull grey on those summits that lie within areas designated Wilderness by the DEC. When it was updated in 2008, the CPSLMP permitted the canisters but left the final decision on whether to permit their use on state land to the individual UMPs.

In 2020 the club installed canisters on the summits of Eagle Mountain and Kaaterskill High Peak, at DEC's request, in order to better compile information on their use. All canisters were also repainted orange at this time, again at DEC's request, in the hope of making them easier to find and reduce the proliferation of herd paths on trailless peaks.
