= Peekamoose Mountain =

Mountain in New York, United States

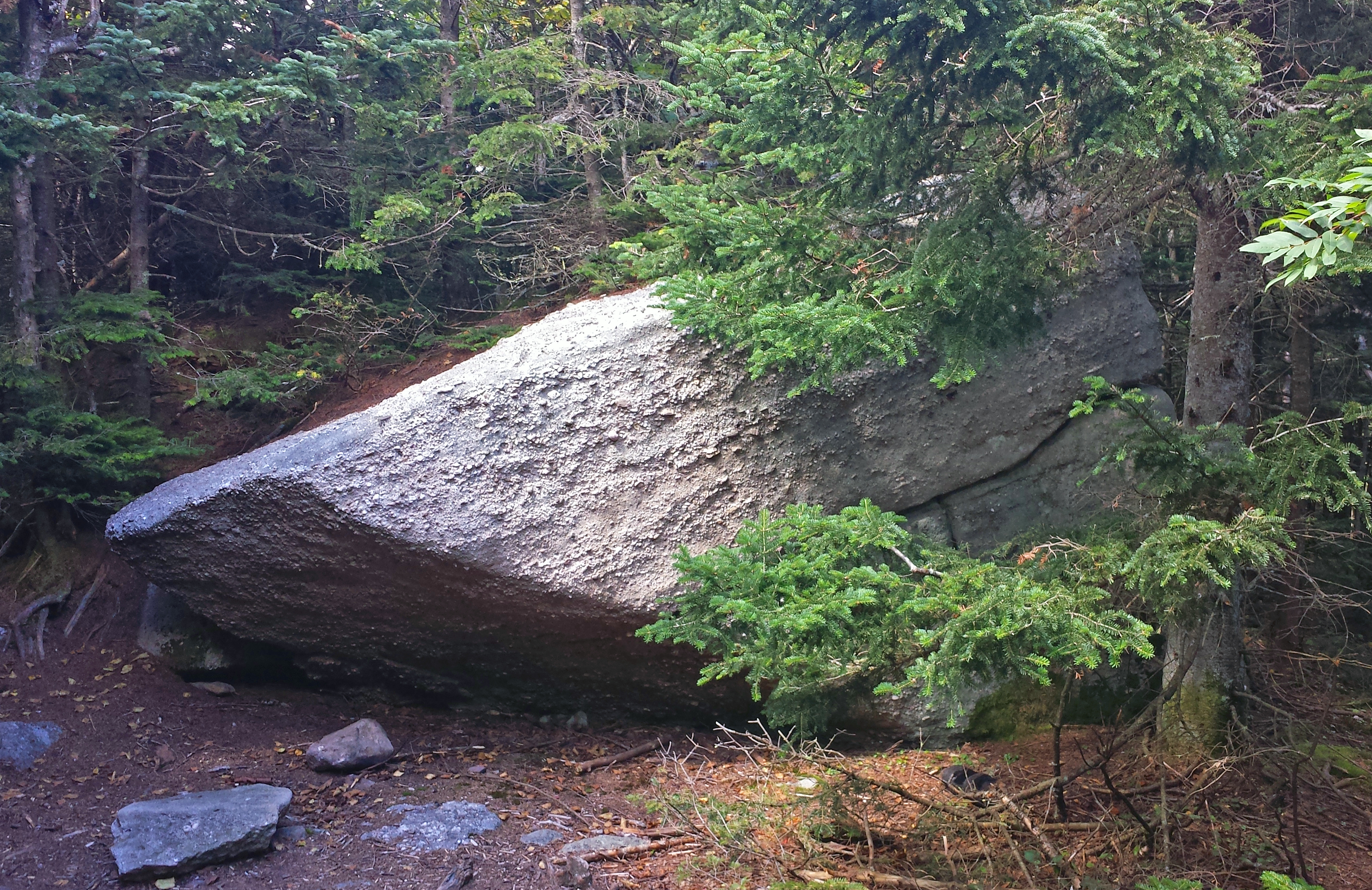
- Boulder at summit

Highest point
- Elevation: 3,843 feet (1,171 m)
- Prominence: 190 ft (60 m)
- Listing: Catskill High Peaks 11th
- Coordinates: 41°57.18′N 74°23.89′W

Geography
- Location within New York Location within the United States
- Location: Ulster County, New York
- Parent range: Catskill Mountains
- Topo map: USGS Peekamoose Mountain

Climbing
- Easiest route: Trail

Peekamoose Mountain is a mountain located in Ulster County, New York. The mountain is part of the Catskill Mountains. Peekamoose Mountain is flanked to the north by Table Mountain. The name Peekamoose is possibly an anglicization of an Algonquin word meaning 'broken off smooth', cf. Poke-O-Moonshine Mountain.

Peekamoose Mountain stands within the watershed of Rondout Creek, a tributary of the Hudson River, which drains into New York Bay. The east and southeast slopes of Peekamoose Mtn. drain into Rondout Creek. The southwest end of Peekamoose drains into Buttermilk Falls Brook, thence into Rondout Creek. The west side of Peekamoose drains into Bear Hole Brook, thence into Rondout Creek.

Peekamoose Mountain is within the Slide Mountain Wilderness of New York's Catskill State Park. The Long Path, a 350-mile (560 km) long-distance hiking trail from New York City to Albany, crosses the summits of Peekamoose and Table.

== See also ==
- List of mountains in New York
