= Table Mountain (New York) =

Mountain in New York, United States

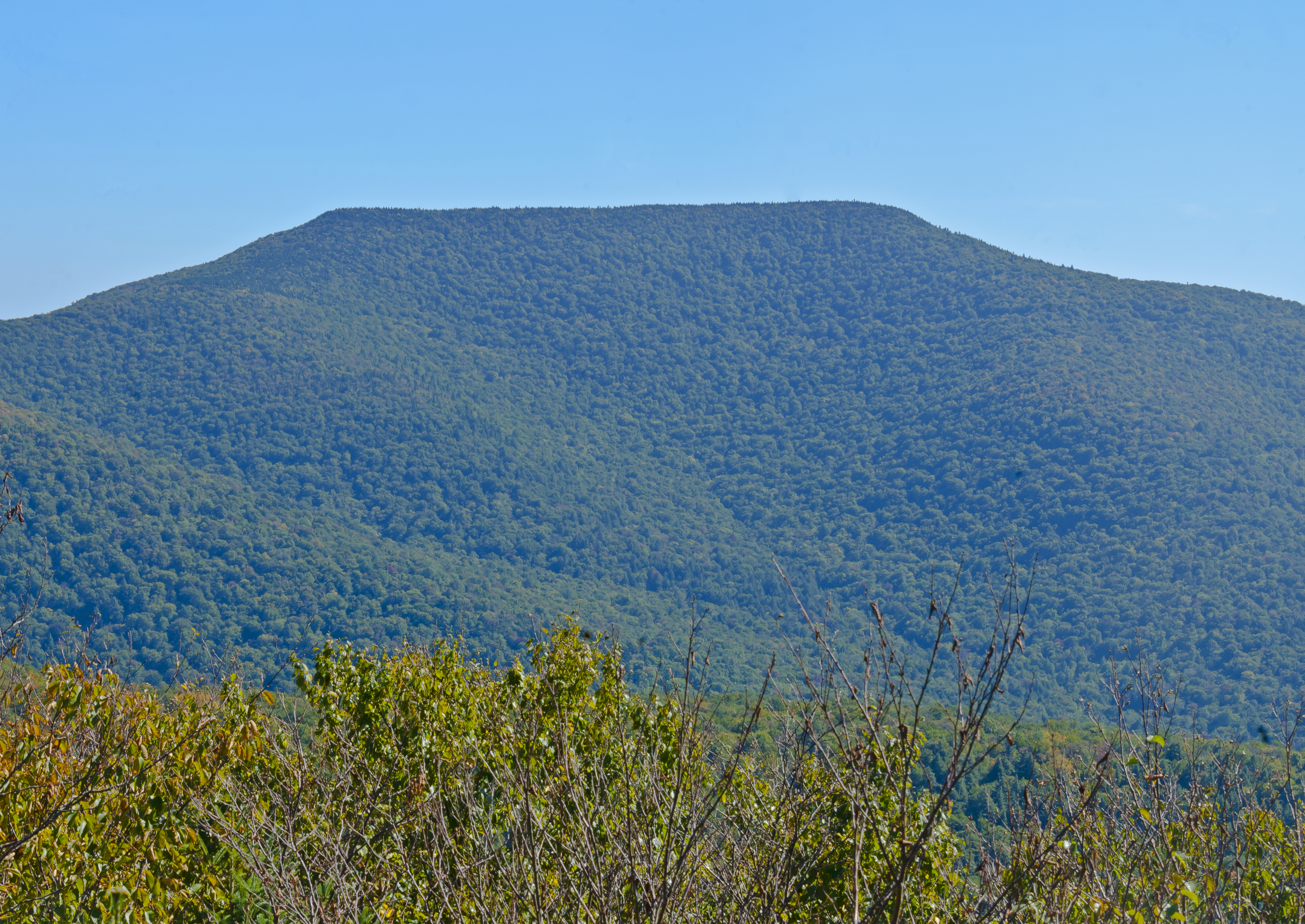
- Table from Curtis-Ormsbee Trail up Slide Mountain to the north

Highest point
- Elevation: 3,847 ft (1,173 m)
- Prominence: 660 ft (200 m)
- Listing: Catskill High Peaks 10th
- Coordinates: 41°57.52′N 74°24.29′W

Geography
- Location within New York Location within the United States
- Location: Ulster County, New York
- Parent range: Catskill Mountains
- Topo map: USGS Peekamoose Mountain

Climbing
- Easiest route: Peekamoose–Table Trail, part of Long Path

Table Mountain is located in Ulster County, New York. The mountain is part of the Catskill Mountains. Table Mountain is flanked to the south by Peekamoose Mountain, and to the northeast by Lone Mountain.

The east end of Table Mountain drains into Rondout Creek, thence into the Hudson River, and into New York Bay. The south side of Table Mtn. drains into Bear Hole Brook, thence into Rondout Creek. The west end of Table Mtn. drains into Tray Mill Brook, thence into the East Branch of the Neversink River, the Delaware River, and into Delaware Bay. The north side of Table Mtn. drains into Donovan Brook, thence into the East Branch of the Neversink.

Table Mountain is within the Slide Mountain Wilderness of New York's Catskill State Park. The Long Path, a 350-mile (560 km) long-distance hiking trail from New York City to Albany, crosses the summits of Peekamoose and Table.

== See also ==
- List of mountains in New York
