= Mount Pleasant, Ulster County, New York =

Mount Pleasant is a populated place in the town of Shandaken in Ulster County, New York, United States. Mount Pleasant is located along New York State Route 28 within Catskill State Park, to the south of Phoenicia and to the north of Boiceville. The community is located at 42°02′54″N 74°17′21″W.

== History ==
In 1805, Jacob Montrose was a licensed innkeeper who lived at "The Corner", near Mount Pleasant. In 1810, it was held by Jacob Longyear. There was later a railroad station at Mount Pleasant.

In 1880, the Ulster County Manufacturing company operated a pulp-mill in the hamlet. Joseph Degraff ran a pill box factory. There was also James Lockwood's store, Martin Terwilliger's blacksmith shop, John Inglodson's shoe shop, two mills, and a hotel.
