= Winnisook Lake =

Source of Esopus Creek in New York's Catskill Mountains

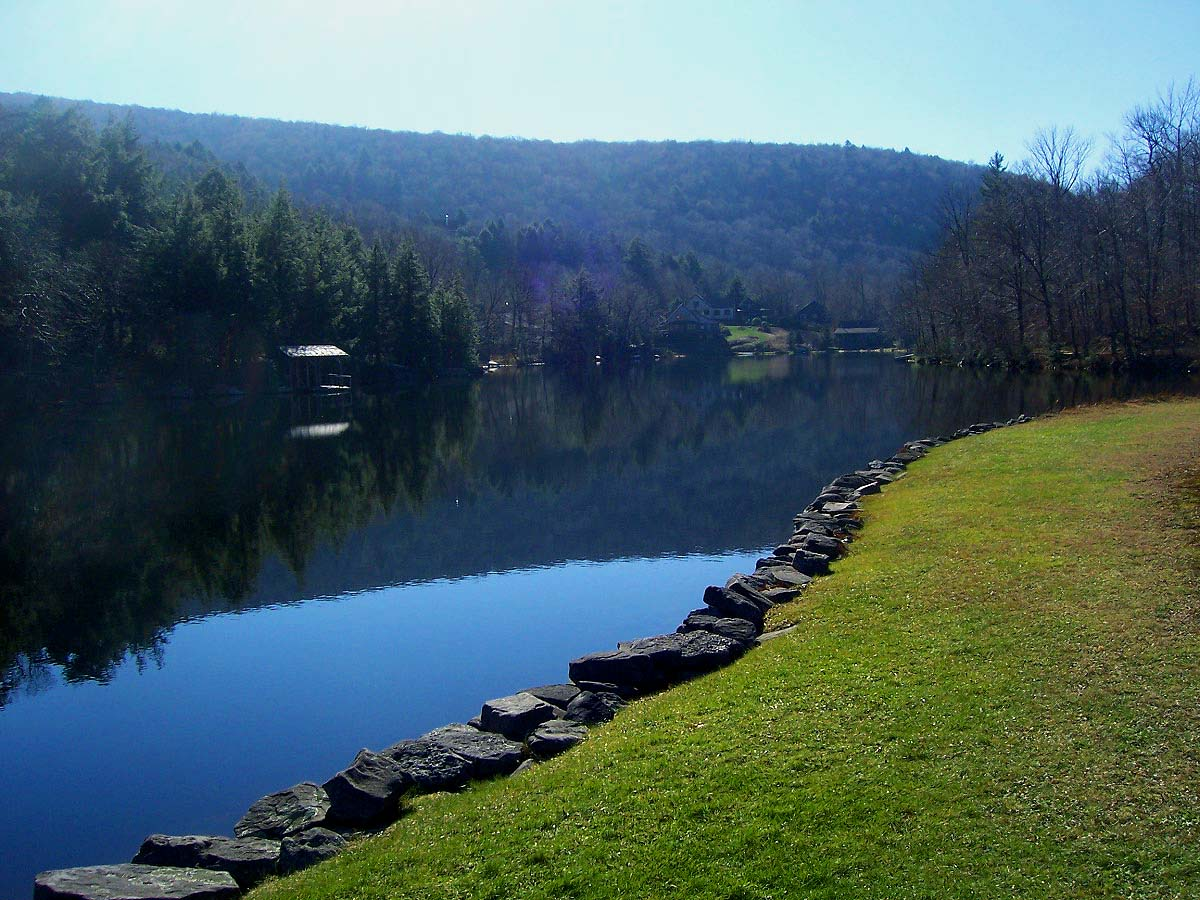
- From northeast corner

- Location within New York Winnisook Lake (the United States)
- Location: Ulster County, New York
- Coordinates: 42°00′52″N 74°24′45″W
- Type: Artificial
- Primary outflows: Esopus Creek
- Basin countries: United States
- Surface area: 5 acres (2.0 ha)
- Surface elevation: 2,664 ft (812 m)

Winnisook Lake is an artificial lake located in Oliverea, New York, United States. It is the source of Esopus Creek and the highest lake in the Catskill Mountains at 2,664 feet (812 m) above sea level.

The lake is the private property of the Winnisook Club, which expanded it with a dam so they could have a place to fish. This created some problems with hikers in the past, who would park along the neighboring stretch of Ulster County Route 47 and cross the club's property to reach state-owned Forest Preserve lands and climb the Catskills' highest peak, neighboring Slide Mountain. Crowds of hikers steadily increased throughout the 1970s, causing the club to consider closing what had long been one of the easiest ways to ascend the peak. New York's Department of Environmental Conservation (DEC) solved the problem in the early 1980s by buying some land to the south of the club and building a new access trail over it.

The stretch of Route 47 next to the lake has the distinction of being the highest elevation improved public through road in the state.

The name, one of the few Indian place names in the Catskills, comes from Winnisook, the same legendary figure from whom the nearby hamlet of Big Indian and Big Indian Mountain draw their names.

== See also ==
- List of reservoirs and dams in New York
