= Catskill High Peaks =

Mountains in New York, United States

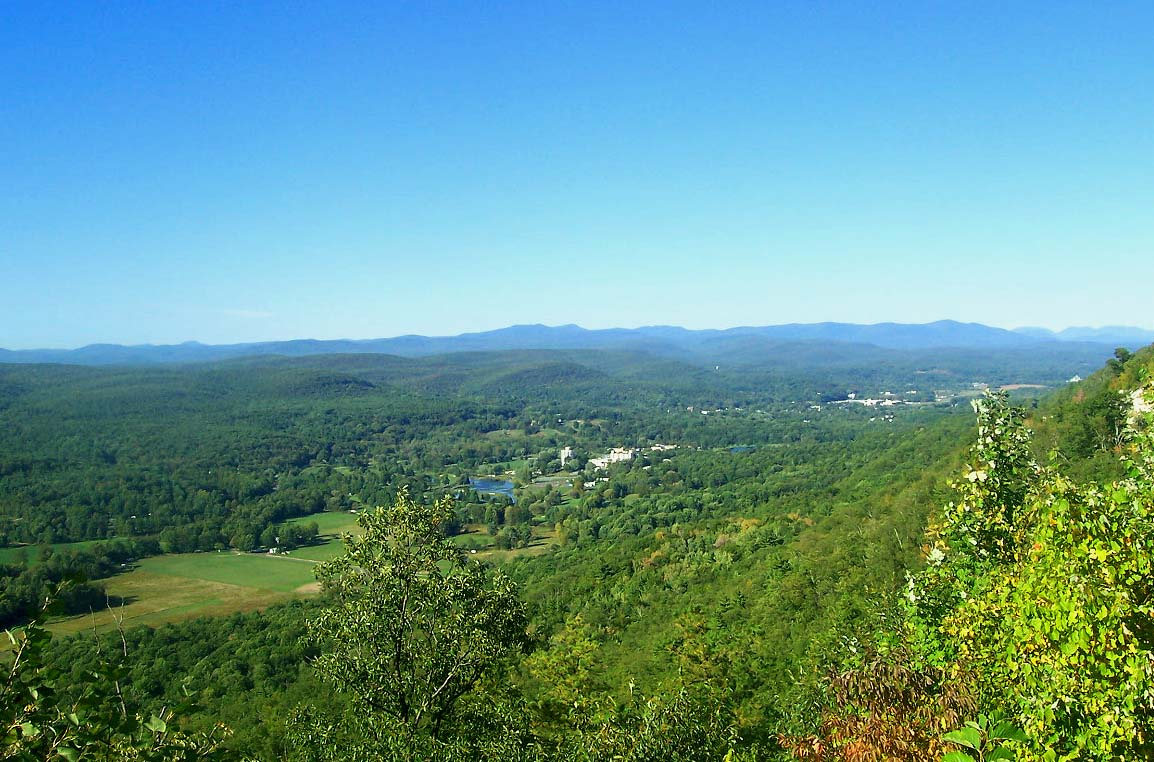
Seventeen of the thirty-five Catskill High Peaks are visible in this photo, taken from the Shawangunk Ridge above Ellenville. The peaks of Ulster County are in the foreground, with Greene County's Devil's Path at the far right.

The Catskill High Peaks are all of the mountains in New York's Catskill Mountains above 3,500 ft (1,067 m) in elevation whose summits are separated either by one-half mile (0.8 km) or a vertical drop of at least 250 ft (76.2 m) between it and the next nearest separate summit. By usual standards, these mountains are rather low and rounded, and mostly covered by vegetation.

Unlike the Adirondack High Peaks, those in the Catskills are more evenly distributed around the eastern half of the range instead of being confined to one small area. All except Bearpen and Vly lie within the Catskill Park Blue Line.

== The 3500s ==
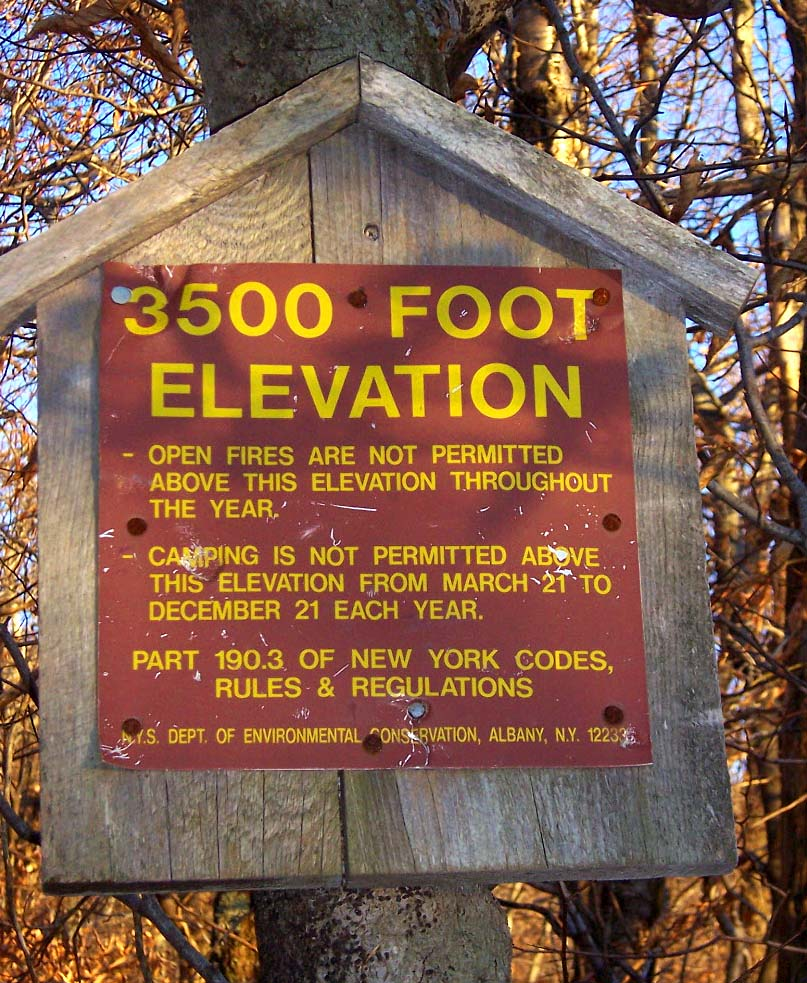
DEC sign listing High Peak regulations

The 3,500-foot (1,067 m) elevation was chosen in the early 1950s when Dan Smiley, a descendant of the founders of Mohonk Mountain House and his fellow birders were trying to find the elusive Bicknell's thrush, which prefers to nest and breed in the boreal forests that predominate above that elevation in the Catskills. They drew up a list nearly identical to the one below and published it in a naturalists' journal.

A decade later hikers interested in peak bagging formed the Catskill Mountain 3500 Club, an organization similar to the better-known Adirondack 46ers, to promote the climbing of 34 of the 35 peaks listed below ("Southwest Hunter" was added to the list in 1992). The club implemented the peak-separation rule, modeled on the one already in use by the Appalachian Mountain Club. Prospective members are required to climb all (13 have no established route to the summit, requiring a bushwack) and then do Slide, Blackhead, Balsam and Panther mountains again in wintertime.

Today the New York State Department of Environmental Conservation enforces special rules for all the lands it manages in the Catskills above 3,500 ft (1,067 m), whether tiny plots such as on Rocky or vast ridgetops as on Plateau, Hunter and West Kill, due to the fragility of the ecosystems. In these areas, camping is permitted only in dire emergencies except during winter, when snow shields the earth somewhat, and open fires are banned. Almost all were designated bird conservation areas by Governor George Pataki in 1999, due to Bicknell's and other vulnerable species that return there in springtime to nest and breed.

== The high peaks ==
Surveys of the Catskills date to the 1940s at the newest, and exact elevations have never been officially determined for many of these peaks. In those cases, their elevations are indicated by the highest 20 feet (6.096 m) contour shown on the United States Geological Survey (USGS) quadrangles with a plus (+) sign.

Peak Name	Alt. Feet	Alt. Meters	Rank	Access
Slide Mountain+	4180	1275	1	Slide-Cornell-Wittenberg Trail
Hunter Mountain+	4040	1230	2	Hunter Mtn, Becker Hollow, and Spruceton Trails
Black Dome+	3980	1210	3	Black Dome Range Trail
Thomas Cole+	3940	1200	4	Black Dome Range Trail
Blackhead+	3940	1200	5	Escarpment Trail/Long Path and Blackhead Mtn Spur
West Kill+	3880	1180	6	Devil's Path
Graham Mountain	3868	1179	7	Private property. No public access.
Doubletop Mountain+	3860	1180	8	Private property. No public access.
Cornell Mountain+	3860	1180	9	Slide-Cornell-Wittenburg Trail
Table Mountain	3847	1173	10	Peekamoose-Table Trail
Peekamoose Mountain	3843	1171	11	Peekamoose-Table Trail
Plateau Mountain+	3840	1170	12	Devil's Path/Long Path
Sugarloaf Mountain+	3800	1160	13	Devil's Path/Long Path
Wittenberg Mountain+	3780	1150	14	Slide-Cornell-Wittenburg Trail
"Southwest Hunter"+^{a}	3740	1140	15	No trail. Bushwhack.
Balsam Lake Mountain	3723	1135	16	Balsam Lake Mountain Trail
Lone Mountain	3721	1134	17	No trail. Bushwhack.
Panther Mountain+	3720	1130	18	Giant Ledge-Panther Mtn. Trail
Big Indian Mountain+	3700	1130	19	No trail. Bushwhack.
Friday Mountain	3694	1126	20	No trail. Bushwhack.
Rusk Mountain+	3680	1127	21	No trail. Bushwhack.
Kaaterskill High Peak	3655	1114	22	No trail. Bushwhack.
Twin Mountain+	3640	1109	23	Devil's Path/Long Path
Balsam Cap	3623	1104	24	No trail. Bushwhack.
Fir Mountain+	3620	1103	25	No trail. Bushwhack.
North Dome	3610	1100	26	No trail. Bushwhack.
Eagle Mountain+	3600	1100	27	No trail. Bushwhack.
Balsam Mountain+	3600	1100	28	Pine Hill-West Branch Trail
Bearpen Mountain^{b}	3600	1100	29	Old State Forest woods road
Indian Head	3573	1089	30	Devil's Path/Long Path
Sherrill Mountain+	3540	1080	31	No trail. Bushwhack.
Halcott Mountain	3537	1078	32	No trail. Bushwhack.
Vly Mountain	3529	1076	33	No trail. Bushwhack.
Windham High Peak	3524	1074	34	Escarpment Trail/Long Path
Rocky Mountain	3508	1069	35	No trail. Bushwhack.

^a The name is currently unofficial. It refers to the peak that rises between Hunter and West Kill on the USGS Lexington quad

^b This refers not to "Bearpen Mountain" shown on the USGS Prattsville quad straddling the border between Delaware and Greene counties at 3,520 feet (1,070 m), but rather the unnamed higher area approximately one-half mile (800 m) to the southeast in Greene County.

== Potential High Peaks ==
Without the aforementioned "AND" ruling of the Catskill 3500 Club, the unnamed summit west of Thomas Cole (unofficially referred to as "Camel's Hump") sits within the 3,520-foot (1,070 m) contour and is more than the required distance from that peak's summit. No one has yet considered it a High Peak, however.

The inexact nature of past USGS surveys of the region have led to speculation that two 3,480-foot (1,060 m) summits in the western Catskills might prove to be High Peaks if measurements were redone with more modern technology. GPS readings on some summits have consistently suggested higher elevations than those given on the maps.

Mill Brook Ridge, the named summit of the pair, would displace neighboring Balsam Lake as the westernmost Catskill High Peak were any of the land in its summit contour found to exceed 3,500 feet. However, much of that land is as flat as the map suggests and the peak may come close to that height but not over it.

The other is "East Schoolhouse Mountain," the unofficial name for the higher of the two peaks on the ridge between Balsam Lake and neighboring Graham. Digital Elevation Modeling (DEM) data in some mapping software suggests its summit may just exceed the limit.

There is also a tiny 3,500-foot (1,100 m) contour indicated more than a half-mile east of West Kill's summit, right next to the drop into Diamond Notch, but exploration of that area has cast doubt on whether it actually exists.

== See also ==
- Catskill Mountains
- Munro
