= Winnisook Club =

Private Club in Big Indian, Indiana

The Winnisook Club is a private club located in Big Indian, New York, and has been in operation since 1886. The club is named after Chief Winnisook, an American Indian from area folklore. The club is situated on man-made Winnisook Lake with a number of private homes surrounding the lake. The club also consists of a lodge and dining facilities and employs a full-time caretaker as well as staff for the dining facilities. The club is situated on private property and membership is by invitation only.
