= Shandaken, New York =

- Town
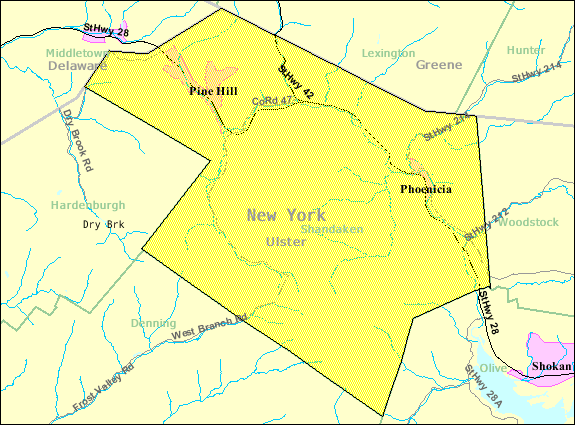
- US Census Map

- Location in Ulster County and the state of New York.
- Coordinates: 42°6′40″N 74°22′55″W
- Country: United States
- State: New York
- County: Ulster

Area
  - Total: 119.84 sq mi (310.39 km^{2})
  - Land: 119.78 sq mi (310.24 km^{2})
  - Water: 0.058 sq mi (0.15 km^{2})
- Elevation: 1,348 ft (411 m)

Population (2020)
  - Total: 2,866
  - Density: 23.93/sq mi (9.238/km^{2})
- Time zone: UTC-5 (Eastern (EST))
  - Summer (DST): UTC-4 (EDT)
- ZIP code: 12480
- Area code: 845
- FIPS code: 36-66597
- GNIS feature ID: 0979484
- Website: https://www.shandaken.gov/

Shandaken is a town on the northern border of Ulster County, New York, United States, northwest of Kingston, New York. As of the 2020 census, the town had a total population of 2,866. The name is believed to be from an Esopus phrase for "land of rapid waters."

== History ==
The town was first settled around the time of the American Revolution. Shandaken was established as a town in 1804 from part of the Town of Woodstock.

In 1809, the town was increased by territory from the Town of Neversink (in Sullivan County). Later, some of Shandaken was used to help form the Towns of Denning, Hardenburgh, and Olive. By the final years of the 19th century, Shandaken had developed the tourist industry which is still the most important part of its economy.

The population of Shandaken in 1900 was 4,053.

An alternate translation of the native word "shandaken" is the "place of the hemlocks."

The Mount Tremper Fire Observation Station was listed on the National Register of Historic Places in 2001.

During and after the COVID-19 pandemic in the United States, Shandaken saw an increase in homes being utilized as second homes, many of which were used as vacation rentals.

== Geography ==
According to the United States Census Bureau, the town has a total area of 119.8 square miles (310 km^{2}), of which 119.8 square miles (310 km^{2}) is land and 0.04 square miles (0.10 km^{2}) is water. The total area is 0.02% water.

The town is inside the Catskill Park, and is entirely mountainous. Within it lies Slide Mountain, the Catskill Mountains' highest peak at 4,180 ft (1,270 m), and several of the other Catskill High Peaks over 3,500 ft (1,100 m) in elevation.

The northern town line is the border of Greene County, and the western town boundary is the border of Delaware County.

The Esopus Creek flows across the town.

== Demographics ==
Historical population
Census	Pop.	Note	%±
1820	1,043		—
1830	966		−7.4%
1840	1,455		50.6%
1850	2,307		58.6%
1860	2,430		5.3%
1870	2,751		13.2%
1880	2,829		2.8%
1890	3,170		12.1%
1900	3,053		−3.7%
1910	2,657		−13.0%
1920	2,372		−10.7%
1930	2,066		−12.9%
1940	1,875		−9.2%
1950	1,887		0.6%
1960	2,078		10.1%
1970	2,593		24.8%
1980	2,912		12.3%
1990	3,013		3.5%
2000	3,235		7.4%
2010	3,085		−4.6%
2020	2,866		−7.1%
U.S. Decennial Census 2020

As of the census of 2020, there were 2,866 people and 1,473 households and 654 families residing in the town. The population density was 27.0 inhabitants per square mile (10.4/km^{2}). There were 2,666 housing units at an average density of 22.3 per square mile (8.6/km^{2}). The racial makeup of the town was 94.65% white, 1.21% African American, 0.40% Native American, 1.17% Asian, 0.12% Pacific Islander, 0.56% from other races, and 1.89% from two or more races. Hispanic or Latino of any race were 3.06% of the population.

There were 1,473 households, out of which 149 had children under the age of 18 living with them, 43.0% were married couples living together, 9.8% had a female householder with no husband present, and 43.3% were non-families. 34.4% of all households were made up of individuals, and 14.2% had someone living alone who was 65 years of age or older. The average household size was 2.17 and the average family size was 2.82.

In the town, the population was spread out, with 20.2% under the age of 18, 5.5% from 18 to 24, 24.2% from 25 to 44, 32.6% from 45 to 64, and 17.4% who were 65 years of age or older. The median age was 45 years. For every 100 females, there were 98.3 males. For every 100 females age 18 and over, there were 98.8 males.

The median income for a household in the town was $55,139, and the median income for a family was $80,372. Families had a median income of $97,500, married-couple families of $104,005 and nonfamily households of $34,806. The per capita income for the town was $21,121. About 20.5% of the population was below the poverty line compared to 17.7% in Ulster County, including 13.0% of those under age 18 and 17.6% of those age 65 or over.

As of 2026, 24% of people in Shandaken worked from home.

== Services ==
The town paramedic ambulance service is also provided to residents of the towns of Olive, Lexington, and Westkill. The town also has a police department located at 64 SR 42 in the hamlet of Shandaken; it was originally established as a constabulary, and became a police department in the early 1990s. The police department consists of four full-time and nine part-time members, and is dispatched by through the Ulster County sheriff's office. The sheriff's office has a post located within the town offices located on Route 28, which is not staffed continuously. There are two emergency call boxes located in the town, one on the north-facing side of the town hall (SR 28) and the other on the south-facing side of the town police department (located on SR 42)

The Shandaken Justice Court is a part-time court, housed within the town offices on SR 28; it handles all traffic violations, misdemeanor criminal cases, and civil cases. Traffic court is held every Tuesday with few exceptions.

== Communities and locations in Shandaken ==
- Allaben – a hamlet east of Shandaken village on Route 28. It is the seat of town government.
- Beechford – a hamlet in the southeastern corner of the town.
- Big Indian – a hamlet southwest of Shandaken village on Route 28 in the Big Indian Valley.
- Bushnellsville – a hamlet by the northern town line on Route 42.
- Chichester – a hamlet in the eastern part of the town, north of Phoenicia on Route 214. Its roots lay in the manufacture of furniture until the Depression destroyed the business. It was founded in 1863.
- Cornell Mountain – mountain peak just east of Slide Mountain and southwest of Wittenberg Mountain.
- Highmount – a location northwest of Pine Hill. It was originally called "Summit". It was also known as "Grand Hotel Station".
- Mt. Pleasant – a hamlet in the eastern part of the town on Route 28 south of Phoenicia. This community was previously called "Longyear" and "Riseley's".
- Mt. Tremper – a hamlet near the eastern town line. It was previously called "Ladew Corners" and "The Corner". The Camp Wapanachki was listed on the National Register of Historic Places in 1994.
- Oliverea – a hamlet, founded in 1886, in the southern part of the town on Route 47. It is home to the Winnisook Club, which is located at the base of Slide Mountain next to Winnisook Lake.
- Panther Mountain – a roughly circular mountain ridge in the center of the town that is believed to be the result of a meteor impact.
- Phoenicia – a hamlet in the eastern part of the town. It was the first community to be connected to the outside world by a railroad (the Ulster and Delaware Railroad) and the first to begin hotel construction for the tourist industry.
- Pine Hill – a hamlet in the western part of the town.
- Shandaken – the hamlet of Shandaken is in the north central part of the town on Route 28.
- Slide Mountain – Slide Mountain is the highest point in the Catskill Mountains.
- Wittenberg Mountain – mountain peak with good views of nearby Ashoken Reservoir.
- Woodland Valley – a hamlet in the southeastern part of the town, south of Phoenicia. It is still home to the Roxmor Colony.

== Notable people ==
- Hiram Whitney, grandson of Eli Whitney and sawmill owner in hamlet of Shandaken
- Henry Jackson Morton, first president of the Stevens Institute of Technology in Pinehill.
- Hideyo Noguchi, Japanese bacteriologist from Rockefeller Institute for Medical Research with summer home in the hamlet of Shandaken.
- Amelia Agostini de Del Río, Puerto Rican writer and educator in the hamlet of Bushnellsville.
- Ángel del Río, Spanish literary scholar exiled under Francisco Franco and married to Amelia Agostini in the hamlet of Bushnellsville.
- Nathan "Nat" Finkelstein, American photographer and photojournalist.
- Lhasa de Sela, singer and songwriter born in the hamlet of Big Indian.
