= Slide Mountain Wilderness Area =

Protected area in New York, United States

- IUCN category Ib (wilderness area)
- Location within the United States
- Location: Ulster County, New York, United States
- Nearest city: Kingston, New York
- Coordinates: 41°59′55″N 74°23′11″W
- Area: 47,500 acres (192 km^{2})
- Established: 1985
- Visitors: 23,000 (in 2003)
- Governing body: New York State Department of Environmental Conservation

The Slide Mountain Wilderness Area is, at 47,500 acres (19,200 ha), the largest tract of state-owned Forest Preserve in New York's Catskill Park, and the largest area under any kind of wilderness area protection between the Adirondacks and the southern Appalachians. It is located in the towns of Shandaken, Denning and Olive in Ulster County.

== Location ==
Within those three towns, the Slide Wilderness might be better described as contained within the lands bounded on the north roughly by Esopus Creek and Route 28, the east by Ulster County Route 42 (known in different towns as Sundown Road or Peekamoose Road) almost to the shores of Ashokan Reservoir, the west by Ulster County Route 47, and on the south by Sugarloaf Road and Red Hill Road.

The area's wilderness character is buffered not only by restrictive local zoning and conservation of neighboring private lands but also by bordering on two other large state-owned tracts, the Big Indian-Beaver Kill Wilderness Area to the west and the Sundown Wild Forest to the east.

== Geography ==
According to Catskill forest historian Michael Kudish, the Slide wilderness contains the most extensive tract of first-growth forest in the Catskills. Much of the area remained out of reach during the peak years of logging and barkpeeling from eastern hemlock trees, to make tannin for leather production in the mid-19th century, and thus remained largely untouched. Indeed, the upper valley of the East Branch of the Neversink, located centrally within the SMWA, is the only completely wild valley in the Catskills. It is possible to look out over it from several points on the surrounding mountains and see no evidence of civilization.

Within its boundaries lie 10 of the 35 Catskill High Peaks, including the highest Catskill peak, Slide, 4,180 feet (1277 m) of elevation; and lowest, Rocky.

Three important regional streams arise within the wilderness as well: the Neversink River, largest tributary of the Delaware; and Hudson tributaries Rondout and Esopus creeks, both of which are impounded to create major reservoirs for the New York City water supply system. There are, however, no lakes or ponds within it.

The tract is almost completely wooded. DEC identifies five distinct forest communities within the Slide Wilderness: three subtypes of the boreal forest found at higher elevations in the Catskills ("mountain fir", "mountain spruce-fir" and "spruce-fir rocky summit"), hemlock-northern hardwood forest and beech-maple mesic forest northern hardwoods, such as sugar maple, beech and yellow birch, are the most predominant, with associate species such as black cherry, white ash, red maple, basswood, big-tooth aspen and red oak can be found at some locations. White pine and hemlock also carve out some groves of their own, particularly in areas closer to streams.

== Geology ==
=== Flora ===
Hobblebush and serviceberry are common shrubs at the higher elevations. Vascular plants to be found in the forest understorys include several fern varieties (predominantly woodfern and hay-scented), stinging nettle and jewelweed. trillium, wood sorrel, clintonia, bunchberry, starflower and foamflower round out the biome for the flowering plants.

One ravine has been found to support a colony of nodding pogonia, an orchid that grows in only three other locations in New York.

=== Fauna ===
Mammals that favor forest habitat predominate within the Slide Wilderness. Among the 49 species known to exist there, black bears have done exceptionally well, as have snowshoe hare, gray squirrel and porcupine. White-tailed deer, who were successfully reintroduced into New York in 1887 via a protected habitat on lands now part of the wilderness area, winter here. Cottontail rabbit and beaver also maintain lower population levels. Fisher were reintroduced to the area in the late 1970s and have thrived in numbers significant enough to make life difficult for the porcupine, always abundant in the Catskills.

Birds are an especially important component of the local ecosystem for historical reasons. Bicknell's thrush was first observed on the summit of Slide in 1881; today, after recently being declared a separate species from the gray-cheeked thrush, it is considered a threatened species and its summer breeding areas in the boreal forests important enough that in 1999, New York governor George Pataki augmented the wilderness status of the area with Bird Conservation Area status that applied to almost all the Catskill High Peaks. This protects not only the Bicknell's but other species such as the black-and-white warbler, black-throated blue warbler, Canada warbler, red-eyed vireo, Louisiana waterthrush, scarlet tanager and rose-breasted grosbeak, some of which require large unbroken forests to nest.

More common birds observed in the area include ruffed grouse and wild turkey, the latter being common enough to be a game species in the springtime. In all, 98 species of birds are believed to make their home here.

The streams of the Catskills, including those in this wilderness, are famous for their trout, and the brook, brown and rainbow varieties can be found here, although not in sufficient numbers to allow for intensive fishing.

The 37 amphibian and reptile species found in the area include six deemed to be of special concern by the state: Jefferson salamander, blue-spotted salamander, spotted salamander, spotted turtle, wood turtle and eastern hognose snake.

== History ==
While the wilderness area designation is rather recent, formally dating to the 1985 adoption of the Catskill State Land Master Plan, the area has been part of New York's constitutionally protected Forest Preserve for a century before that. Ironically, the lands around Slide Mountain were added to the original legislation not for conservation purposes, but to settle a tax debt Ulster County owed to the state.

== Management ==
The SMWA, like all lands in the state's Forest Preserve, is managed by the Division of Lands and Forests within New York's Department of Environmental Conservation. DEC is the successor agency to the Conservation Department, Conservation Commission and Forest Commission, all of which managed the lands in prior eras.

The forest rangers of DEC's Office of Public Protection provide law enforcement services to the unit.

New York's wilderness-area management guidelines are similar to, if a bit looser than, those followed by the federal government. Any development of new facilities within the unit requires a change to the Unit Management Plan (UMP), or is added only at the UMP's periodic updates, both of which require public comment and extensive review. The UMP is itself governed not only by the state's Environmental Conservation Law, but Article 14 of the state constitution, which requires that the Forest Preserve be kept "forever wild" and free for public use beyond any reasonable fee required for a particular activity.

In a departure from the usual practice of most American public land management, the state pays full property taxes on the lands to all local governmental entities as if it were a commercial landowner.

== Recreational use ==
Use of the land is limited to minimal-impact passive recreation such as hiking, camping, hunting and angling. No powered vehicles are allowed within (The use of chainsaws for trail maintenance is also permitted only by explicit written authority of the DEC commissioner).

There are no designated equestrian trails within the wilderness. While mountain bike usage is currently a matter of debate as the CPSLMP is updated, and not specifically prohibited, it does not seem likely that it will be allowed.

No structures may be erected on the land except those DEC creates within UMP guidelines. Tents are permitted; hunters' tree stands are not.

As of 2005 there are 35.3 miles (56.8 km) of officially maintained and marked trails (more are planned). There are three lean-tos, and 29 officially designated campsites in the wilderness area. Outside of those, camping is not permitted within 150 feet (45.7 m) of any trail, road or stream. In areas above 3,500 feet (1,067 m) in elevation, it is only allowed between December 21 and March 21, when snow protects the ground. Open fires are forbidden above that location as well.

It is the most popular of the four wilderness areas currently located within the Catskill Park.

== Access ==
The state has built 10 separate parking lots along or near roads that abut the Slide wilderness, five of which serve as hiking trailheads.

The sixth trail, the east end of the Burroughs Range Trail which traverses Wittenberg, Cornell and Slide Mountains, starts at the Woodland Valley State Campground, which adjoins the wilderness area. Similarly, camping is available at the southeast corner in the Peekamoose Valley Wild Forest, near the Bull Run trailhead.

There is also a trail referred to as the Dutcher Step Trail that traverses the private property of the Winnisook Club. Anyone attempting to hike this trail should seek permission from the club first. The trail has some interesting views that the main trail does not. The club seems willing to allow hikers on a limited basis as long as you leave the trail as you found it and sign a release first.

== See also ==
- List of U.S. state and tribal wilderness areas
