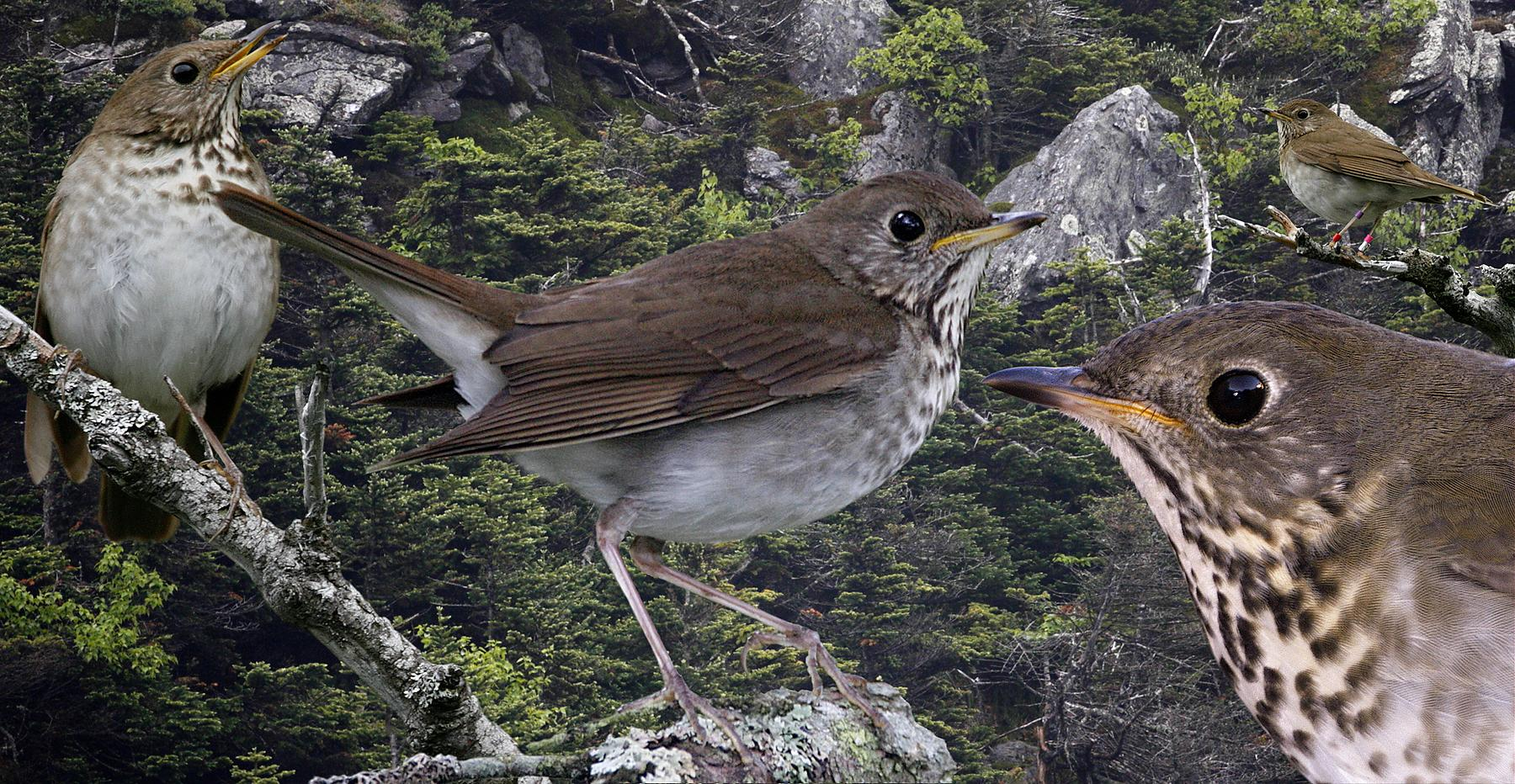

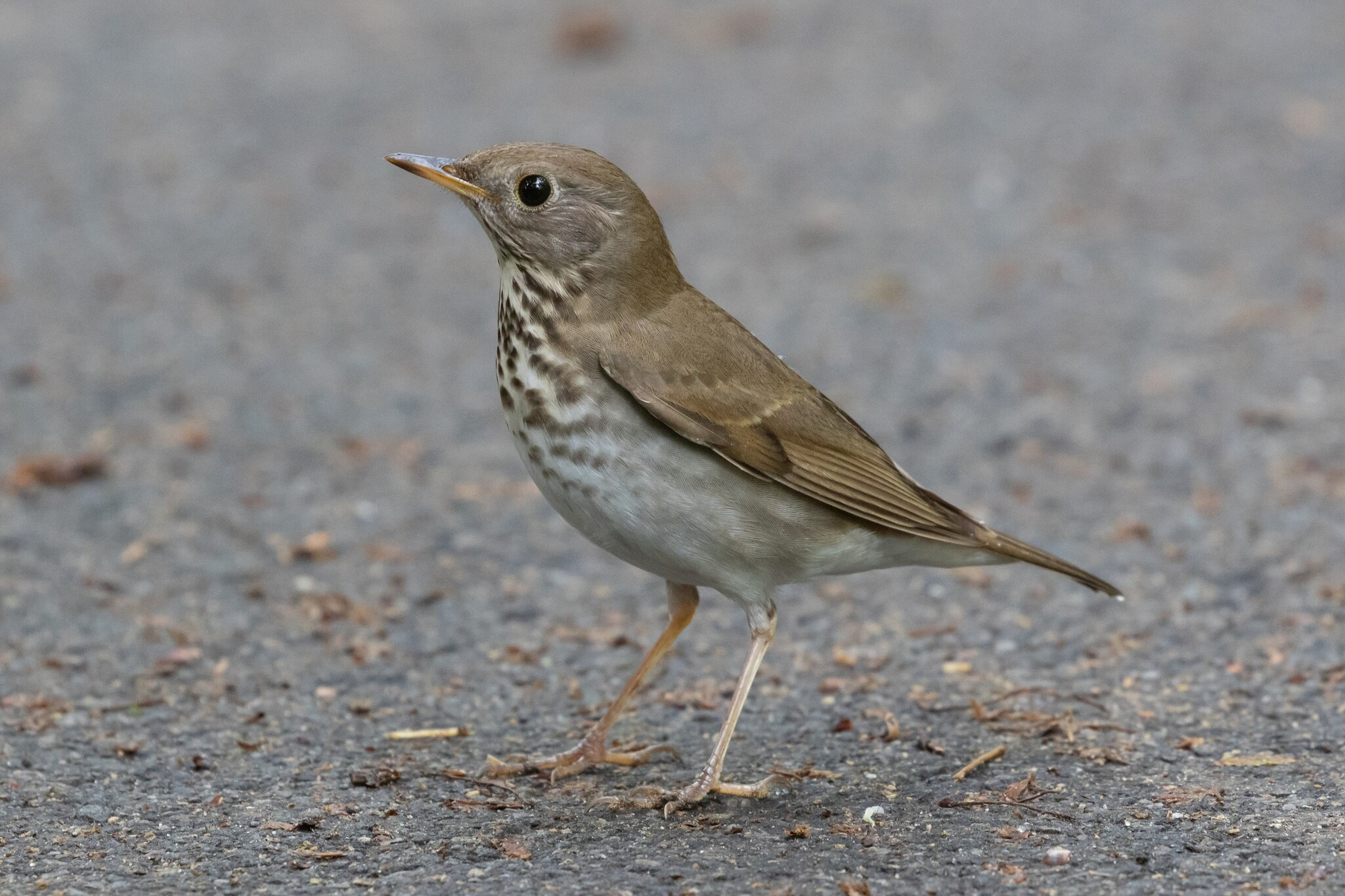

Conservation status
- Vulnerable (IUCN 3.1)

- Apparently Secure (NatureServe)

Scientific classification
- Kingdom: Animalia
- Phylum: Chordata
- Class: Aves
- Order: Passeriformes
- Family: Turdidae
- Genus: Catharus
- Species: C. bicknelli

Binomial name
- Catharus bicknelli (Ridgway, 1882)

Synonyms
- Catharus minimus bicknelli

= Bicknell's thrush =

Species of bird

Bicknell's thrush (Catharus bicknelli) is a medium-sized thrush, at 17.5 cm (6.9 in) and 28 g (0.99 oz). One of North America's rarest and most localized songbirds, it breeds on coniferous mountain tops and disturbed habitats of northeastern North America. While very similar in appearance and vocalization to the gray-cheeked thrush (Catharus minimus), the two species differ slightly in their morphology and vocalizations, although they have with completely different breeding ranges. It was named after Eugene Bicknell, an American amateur ornithologist, who made the first scientific discovery of the species on Slide Mountain in the Catskills in the late 19th century. John Burroughs, in his essay, "The Heart of the Southern Catskills" (1886), writes effusively about the voice of Bicknell's thrush heard near the summit on his climbs of Slide Mountain, and how on his stays on Slide saw them nowhere else but "about the summit", and saw no other thrush but Bicknell's.

== Description ==
Bicknell's thrush is just slightly smaller than the other northern migratory Catharus thrushes, with an average length of approximately 17 cm (6.7 in) and a weight ranging generally from 26 to 30g. Both sexes are identical in the field and are roughly the same size, although males average slightly larger in wing length. Adults are olive-brown to brownish on the upperparts (head, nape, back) contrasting with chestnut-tinged tail. The contrast is, however, less evident in worn plumage. The underparts are off-white with gray on the flanks; the breast is off-white with buffy wash, showing dusky spots that becomes more diffuse toward the sides and the lower breast. They have pink legs, a faint grey eye ring, and gray cheeks. Two-thirds of the lower mandible is yellow colored, while the tip of the lower mandible and upper mandible is blackish. They average slightly smaller than the very similar gray-cheeked thrush but are all but indistinguishable in outward appearance. The song is a jumbled series of flute-like tones ending on a higher note.

== Taxonomy ==
A member of the family Turdidae, Bicknell's thrush belongs to the genus Catharus. This genus includes twelve species, five of which are found in North America. The closest relative of the Bicknell's thrush is its sister species, the gray-cheeked thrush. Together, the gray-cheeked and Bicknell's thrush form a cryptic species pair, and were indeed formerly considered conspecific. However, DNA analysis showed a divergence between the two species about 1 million years ago.

== Habitat and range ==
Bicknell's thrush scattered breeding range extends from southeastern Quebec to Nova Scotia in Canada and the sky islands of northern New England and the Adirondacks and Catskills in New York. It is the rarest and most secretive of the breeding thrushes in North America, and it is the only bird species whose breeding range is entirely restricted to the northeastern part of the continent. It is a habitat specialist in its breeding range. It is known to favor high altitude coniferous forests affected by strong winds and heavy ice conditions. They usually breed at higher elevations, normally nesting above 915 m (3,002 ft). However, they do not only live in this habitat, they also inhabit successional forests that have recently been affected by the forest industry. Its habitat is therefore best characterized by highly disturbed forest, where trees are small and stunted.

Conversely, Bicknell's thrush is more a habitat generalist in migration. The Bicknell's and gray-cheeked thrushes, along with the veery, make up a close-knit group of migrant species. The birds migrate to the Greater Antilles, with an estimated 90% of the individuals wintering in Hispaniola (mostly in the Dominican Republic, but also Haiti). During the winter, they live in broadleaf forests at various elevations but generally preferring higher elevations. Wintering individuals have been recorded from the mountain ranges of the Cordillera Central, Sierra de Baoruco, and Cordillera Septentrional in the Dominican Republic, the Massif de la Hotte in Haiti, the Cordillera Central in Puerto Rico, the Blue Mountains in Jamaica, and the Sierra Maestra in eastern Cuba.

== Behavior ==
=== Vocalization ===
Vocalizing mostly at dawn and dusk, the song is mostly performed by the male, but sometimes also by females. Like all North American thrushes, Bicknell's thrush song is flute-like. High pitched and vibrant, the song is composed of four phrases: "chook-chook, wee-o, wee-o, wee-o-ti-t-ter-ee". Unlike in the gray-cheeked thrush, the pitch of the last phrase is constant or rising.

The primary call is a downward whistle named the "Beer call" "beer". Other calls include a growl call given in alarm situations "crr-rr-rr" and a flight call "cree-e-e".

=== Breeding ===
Bicknell's thrushes have an unusual mating system in which females mate with more than one male. Such a practice, known as polyandry, is not known to occur in other thrushes. As many as four males perform duties connected with one nest, including bringing food for the nestlings. It is possible that females decide to mate with more males when preys are less abundant. Pair formation is thought to occur after female arrival to breeding site in late May. The nest itself is typically a bulky cup made of twigs and moss, close to the trunk of a conifer at base of horizontal branches, usually 2 meters above ground. The female builds the nest alone and lay three or four eggs per clutch. While the incubation period is about two weeks, nestlings, fed by both parents, grow rapidly, developing in 12 days from peanut-sized hatchlings to completely feathered adult-sized birds.

=== Ecology ===
Ticks, blowflies, and lice are some of the parasites with which Bicknell's thrush must contend. The American red squirrel is the main predator of eggs and nestlings, according to breeding ecology. Predators confirmed to hunt nesting adults have consisted of the sharp-shinned hawk, the long-tailed weasel, and the northern saw-whet owl. On the nesting grounds there are at least six other predators suspected or likely to depredate nests and at least three other predators that may attacks nesting adults, to say nothing of potential predators during migration or on wintering grounds.

=== Diet ===
The thrush's diet consists mainly of insects, particularly beetles and ants. They also start eating wild fruits in late summer (mid-July), and continue to do so during migration, and on the wintering grounds. They forage on both insects and wild fruits in winter. They usually forage on the forest floor, but also catch flies, and glean insects from the foliage of trees. Individuals eating fruits on wintering ground forage higher in the tree than those eating insects. Foraging technique varies but Bicknell's thrush mostly searches by pausing and peering, marked by hops and short flights. Sometimes food scratch on the ground, especially in wintering range.

== Conservation and threats ==
=== Population monitoring ===
Mountain Birdwatch data suggest that Bicknell's thrush populations have declined by an average of -3.88% per year (95% Bayesian credible interval: -5.27% to -2.52%) in northern New England and northeastern New York since 2010. The steepest declines (>60% decline between 2010 and 2022, 95% Bayesian credible interval: -75.31% to -33.33%, ) were observed in the Catskill Mountains in New York, USA, the southernmost portion of the Bicknell's thrush global breeding range. At that rate, it is possible that Bicknell's thrush may be extirpated entirely from the Catskills by 2050, with an estimated population loss of >95%. The Catskills, however, likely harbor less than 5% of the U.S. Bicknell's thrush population. The species has already been extirpated from Massachusetts, with the last record there being on Mount Greylock. The U.S. population of Bicknell's thrush is likely around 70,000, and the Canadian population estimated between 40,570 and 49,568, with a global population of less than 120,000. The species was considered a "Special Concern" species by Committee on the Status of Endangered Wildlife in Canada in April 1999. This was later re-examined to consider C. bicknelli "Threatened" in November 2009, and was re-assessed again as such in December 2022.

=== Threats ===
Its numbers are declining in some parts of its already limited range as a result of habitat degradation. Scientists believe that industrial pollution is one of the main reasons for the decline of the red spruce, an important element in Bicknell's thrush habitat in the United States. Airborne heavy metals may also damage high-elevation forests in the northeastern United States. Furthermore, based on expected substantial carbon dioxide increases by the end of the century, scientists predict a radical reduction of balsam fir forest in the eastern United States and Canada. If average global temperatures increase and forests change as much as predicted, Bicknell's thrush habitat is very likely to be altered in ways that may seriously affect the species' survival. Indeed, models predict that Bicknell's thrush will lose more than 50% of its breeding habitat over the next 30 years. Furthermore, recreational development, telecommunication towers and windmills increase is a major cause of habitat fragmentation and deterioration.

Industrial forestry practices, although possibly harmful, may be modified to aid in conservation efforts to protect Bicknell's thrush. While more study is needed, the bird's apparent acceptance of certain commercial second-growth forest gives promise to possibilities of man-made "growing" Bicknell's thrush habitats in the future.

Non-native species are potential risks throughout the thrush's range; introduced moose on Cape Breton Island consume the saplings of the tree species birds breed on, and invasive brown and black rats in the Caribbean may pose a potential threat. With climate change shifting temperature up elevation on mountains, Bicknell's thrush may suffer from asymmetrical and aggressive competition from the Swainson's thrush (Catharus swainsoni).

Bicknell's thrush has a higher concentration of mercury in its blood than any lower-elevation Catharus thrush. Mercury level increases greatly with altitude and its concentration bioaccumulate in the food web, probably explaining why it decreases as breeding season advances and birds begin to feed more on fruits. High mercury concentrations may cause reproductive impairment.

There is also considerable concern about the degradation of Bicknell's thrush's wintering habitats. The Dominican Republic's native forests are under considerable pressure from naturally occurring events such as hurricanes, as well as changes from agricultural activities, particularly at low altitudes. The forested lands of Haiti have been almost eliminated, and in Cuba, most of the known suitable habitat exists only in protected parklands.

=== Management ===
Few management actions are known to be in place, even though management procedures for the species' conservation have been established by the International Bicknell's Thrush Conservation Group (IBTCG). Near ski trails, maintaining vegetation on edges in a gradual slope and keeping large forested "islands" between leaves better habitat for Bicknell's thrush. Limiting vegetation management outside of the breeding season near mountain tops is another way to diminish disturbance. In areas where infrastructures are built in favorable Bicknell's thrush habitat, restoration of non-permanent modifications in the environment by reforesting is recommended. Signs or barriers along trails leading to the infrastructure to minimize disturbance is another suggested measure. As regenerating forests are known to be a good habitat for this species, assuring a continuous forest regeneration after clear-cuts benefits Bicknell's thrush. On winter range, reforestation of agricultural lands is proposed way to protect this declining thrush.
