= New York Bay =

Large bay at the mouth of the Hudson River at the Atlantic Ocean

Coordinates: 40.64°N 74.05°W

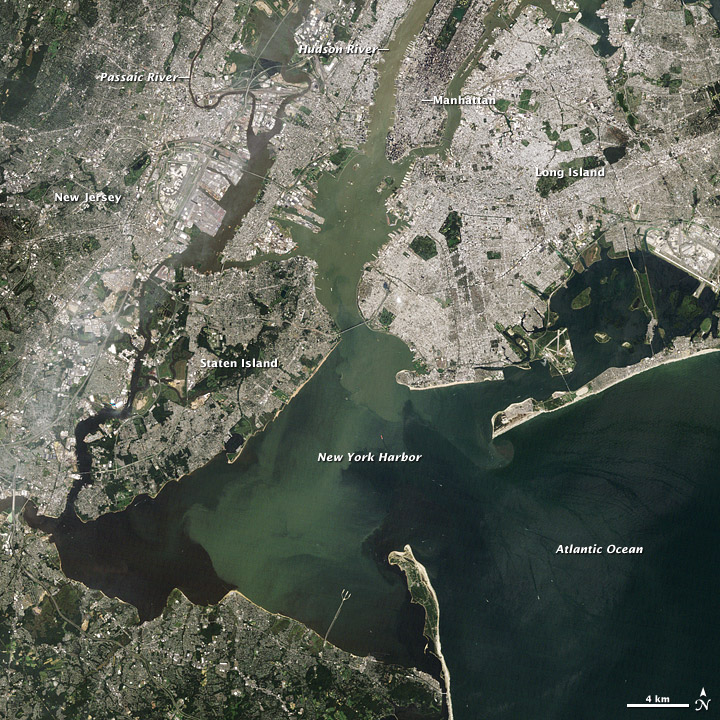
New York Bay

New York Bay is the large tidal body of water in the New York–New Jersey Harbor Estuary where the Hudson River, Raritan River, and Arthur Kill empty into the Atlantic Ocean between Sandy Hook and Rockaway Point.

== Geography ==
New York Bay is usually divided into two major components, which are connected by the Narrows. They are Upper New York Bay and Lower New York Bay.

The term New York Harbor usually refers to Upper New York Bay and the surrounding Port of New York and New Jersey, but sometimes is taken to be a synonym for New York Bay.

Upper New York Bay includes several islands. Liberty Island is the location of the Statue of Liberty. Nearby Ellis Island is known as a former immigration station. Governors Island is a former military base, now a park and historic site. Robbins Reef Light is also in the upper bay. Lower New York Bay includes Hoffman Island and nearby Swinburne Island. Both are artificial islands that are closed to the public.

== History ==
Commissioned by King Francis I of France, the Florentine explorer Giovanni da Verrazzano is the first European to discover the Bay in 1524. He gave it the name of New Angoulême, in honor of the King who was also Count of Angoulême.

== See also ==
- Geography and environment of New York City
- New York Harbor Storm-Surge Barrier
- Port of New York and New Jersey topics
