= Balsam Lake Mountain =

Westernmost of the Catskill High Peaks in U.S. state of New York

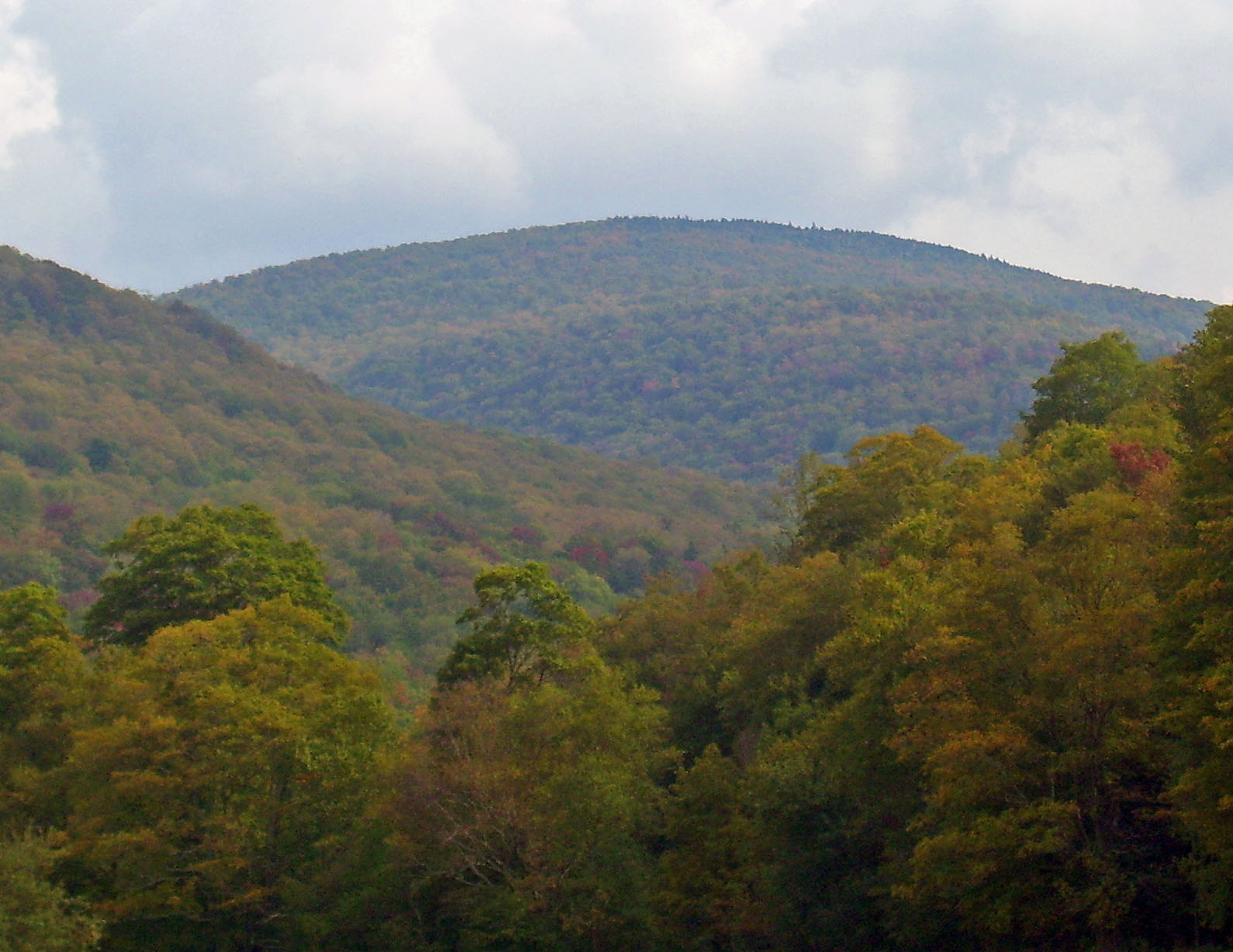
- Balsam Lake Mountain looking up Clark Hollow from Mill Brook Road to the northwest

Highest point
- Elevation: 3,730 ft (1,140 m)
- Prominence: 480 ft (150 m)
- Listing: Catskill High Peaks #16
- Coordinates: 42°2.74′N 74°35.67′W

Geography
- Location: Hardenburgh, New York
- Parent range: Catskill Mountains
- Topo map: USGS Seager

Geology
- Rock age: 250-350 mya
- Mountain type: Mature dissected plateau

Climbing
- Easiest route: Old road to fire tower

Balsam Lake Mountain is one of the Catskill Mountains, located in the Town of Hardenburgh, New York, United States. It is the westernmost of the range's 35 High Peaks. Its exact height has not been determined, but the highest contour line on topographic maps, 3,720 feet (1,130 m), is usually given as its elevation.

Located within the Balsam Lake Mountain Wild Forest management unit of the Catskill Park Forest Preserve, in the late 19th century its summit became the site of the first fire lookout tower in the state, operated by members of a nearby sportsmen's club. It was later taken over by the state's conservation agencies, which built several improved towers on the site, one of which remains, along with its accessory buildings and has been listed on the National Register of Historic Places, although it has not been used for fire detection since 1988. The summit is also the site of a rare sphagnum bog that has been affected by acid rain since a mid-20th century windstorm blew down many of the trees sheltering it at the time.

The tower and the views it commands, as well as its ease of access by the old truck road to the tower, have made it a popular attraction for hikers despite the mountain's remote location. Many are peakbaggers aspiring to membership in the Catskill Mountain 3500 Club, for which Balsam Lake is a required peak.

== Geography ==
Balsam Lake Mountain is in the middle of a long range beginning at Barkaboom Mountain to the west and extending east to Doubletop Mountain. It rises from a base well over 2,000 feet (610 m) on the north and south, with cols over 3,000 feet (910 m) between it and neighboring peaks. Creeks rise in several narrow valleys on all sides, the largest of which is Clark Hollow on the northwest. The steep valley slopes alternate with gentler ridges in between.

The summit plateau above 3,600 feet (1,100 m) is relatively flat, shaped like a large T pointing north, south, and east. On the west, a steep face drops to a shallow col of 3,140 feet (960 m) between Balsam Lake Mountain and the neighboring easternmost 3,420 feet (1,040 m) summit of Mill Brook Ridge. South of that summit extends 3,460-foot (1,050 m) Woodpecker Ridge, which with Balsam Lake Mountain and the connecting ridge forms the narrow valley in which the feeder stream to Balsam Lake, the feature the neighboring mountain is named for, rises. Black Brook flows out of the hollow on the southeast, below a more gradual ridge descending from the summit to a low of 3,340 feet (1,020 m), where it connects to the 3,440-foot (1,050 m) and 3,480-foot (1,060 m) peaks known unofficially as West and East Schoolhouse mountains between Balsam Lake and 3,868-foot (1,179 m) Graham Mountain, the High Peak two miles (3.2 km) to its east.

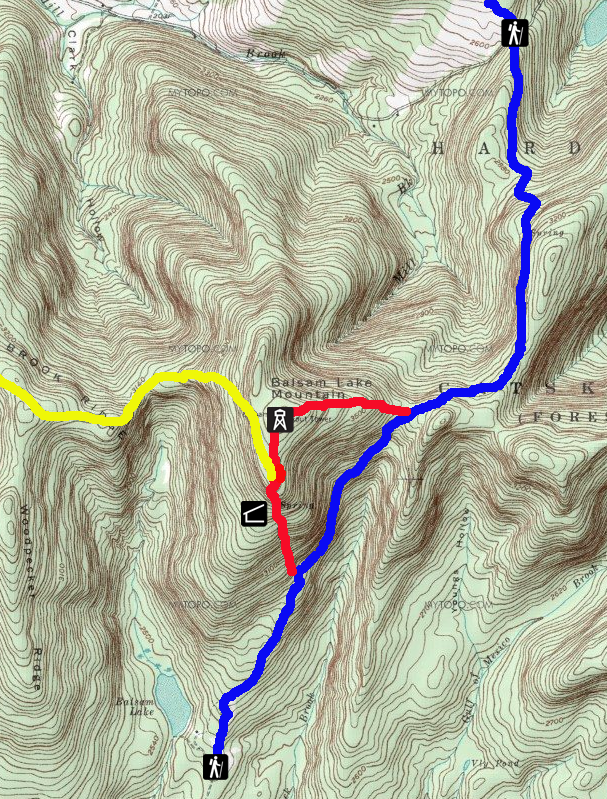
Map of mountain with trails in blaze colors

Mill Brook, which gives the mountain to the west its name, rises from the hollow on the northeast. It is joined by an unnamed tributary which flows into it from Clark Hollow. All the streams that rise on Balsam Lake Mountain are part of the Delaware River's watershed. Mill Brook on the north slopes feeding that river's East Branch directly at Pepacton Reservoir, making it part of New York City's water supply. Water from the southern streams drains into the Beaver Kill not far below the mountain, which itself reaches the East Branch at East Branch well below the reservoir's dam at Downsville.

The southern and northwestern portions of the mountain, down to an elevation of 2,100 feet (640 m) in Clark Hollow, are owned by the state. Its Department of Environmental Conservation (DEC) manages the land as part of the 13,500-acre (5,500 ha) Balsam Lake Mountain Wild Forest, which stretches across Mill Brook Ridge and circles back to Beaverkill Road around private lands along Beecher Lake and brook. The northern slope, up to 3,600 feet (1,100 m) on the summit's northern spur and 3,400 feet (1,000 m) along the fire tower road, is privately owned by the descendants of railroad baron Jay Gould, who grew up in nearby Roxbury.

== Flora and fauna ==
Due to its high base elevations, the lower slopes of the mountain are covered exclusively by a northern hardwood forest of beech, birch and maple, with no oaks or other species found at lower elevations in the Catskills. Much of the mountain remains in first growth, from as low as 2,575 feet (785 m) in Clark Hollow to 3,250 feet (990 m) on its north spur. On the south side the mountain is generally in first growth from 2,800 feet (850 m) up.

At higher elevations, above 3,400 feet (1,000 m) on the north side but not until 3,600 feet (1,100 m) on the south, balsam fir and red spruce begin to appear. The hardwoods, more and more stunted by the harsher conditions at higher elevations, eventually give way to a dense, lower-canopy boreal forest dominated by those two species (primarily the firs) on the summit. Paper birch is the most common deciduous associate, and wood sorrel and moss can be found on the ground.

Within the summit forest is a sphagnum bog. It is dominated by peat mosses, mountain holly and balsam fir, with its perimeter surrounded by yellow birch. According to Catskill forest researcher Michael Kudish it is the deepest bog in the Catskills, with the peat going down 24 inches (61 cm) to the glacial till it rests on. Radiocarbon dating has shown it to be about 5,500 years old, with balsam fir as dominant around the bog then as it is now.

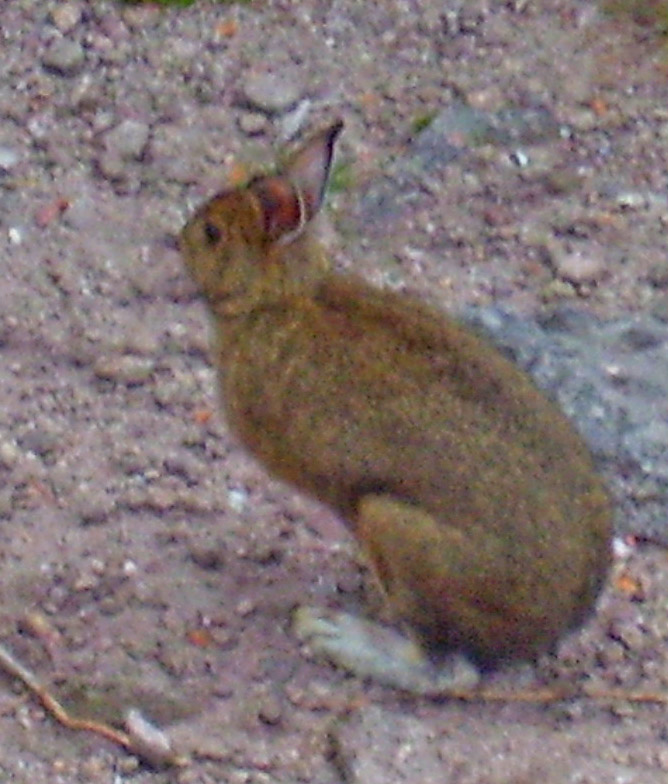
Snowshoe hare at summit

The forests on the mountain support a typical animal community for the Catskills. Black bear and white-tailed deer are the larger mammal species, with rodent and lagomorph species, such as snowshoe hare, lower on the food chain. Beavers have been common over the years, with Kudish finding more evidence of present and past dams and meadows on the slopes of Balsam Lake and its neighboring peaks.

== History ==
The Catskills were formed 250-350 million years ago, during the Devonian and Silurian periods, when the sands and silt that had eroded from the Acadian Mountains to the northeast collected in a river delta at the mouth of the shallow inland sea that is now the Allegheny Plateau. The delta uplifted as a single unit, and gradually streams eroded valleys, creating a dissected plateau. The harder, younger shale and sandstone remains as the mountain summits. Later glaciation made the valleys steeper and smoother.

Catskill forest historian Michael Kudish says the Mill Brook Ridge range, including Balsam Lake, is one of the areas in the region showing the fewest signs of human disturbance. The Iroquois who were the first settlers in today's New York only went into areas above 1,500 feet (460 m) to hunt, if they went there at all. European settlers established few farms in the area, both before and after independence. The clearings that give the Quaker Clearing trailhead its name are the only significant past agricultural use that can still be seen today. Limited logging, primarily by farmers procuring firewood, took place above those clearings.

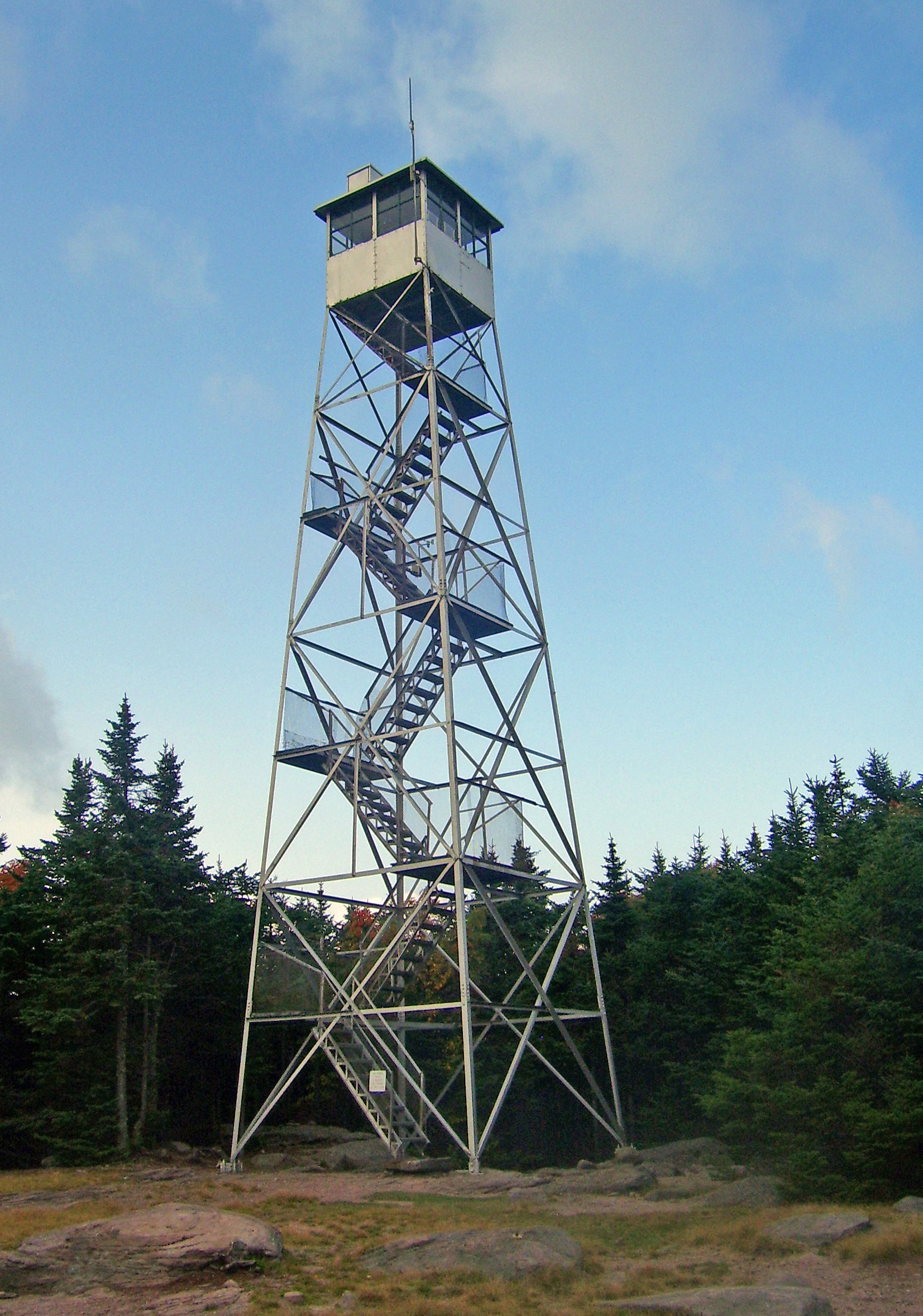
Fire tower

The most significant developments in the human history of the mountain took place in 1887. The state bought the southeast slope of the mountain that year for the newly created Forest Preserve, ensuring the land would remain forever wild, always in public ownership and never logged, per a law later added to the state constitution as Article 14. Also that year the Balsam Lake Club decided to erect a crude wooden fire lookout tower on the summit so that an observer could detect fires that threatened the lands around the lake and the headwaters of the Beaver Kill where they hunted and fished. It was the first such lookout tower built in New York State.

Two years later, the state bought more of the mountain, and eventually acquired the summit itself in 1900. At some point before the United States Geological Survey resurveyed the area for its 1901 maps, the Turner Hollow Road, an old, rough turnpike connecting Seager and Quaker Clearing, often used by members of the Balsam Lake Club to get to the train station at Arkville, was rerouted from the col between East and West Schoolhouse mountains to the one between West Schoolhouse and Balsam Lake. The southern portion survives as part of the Dry Brook Ridge Trail.

Eight years later, in 1909, the state's Forest, Fish and Game Commission took over the fire tower; a decade later it built the first cabin and replaced it with the steel tower that stands today. By 1935 the state was maintaining not only the jeep road to the summit but the old Turner Hollow Road south to Quaker Clearing and the foot trail from the summit to the road.

The Great Appalachian Storm of November 1950 took a heavy toll on the summit balsam firs. Blowdown was extensive in both the bog and non-bog areas. The trees that remained standing died more rapidly due to the exposure. It has since recovered, but the bog has become vulnerable to the effects of acid rain in the meantime, possibly changing its growth patterns.

After a series of severe droughts and fires in the early 1960s that led to some temporary closings of the Forest Preserve, fires and the damage they caused declined due to an increase in public awareness of forest fire danger and the decline in activities that caused them. Staffed fire towers became less essential; the state began closing them down and dismantling them in favor of more cost-effective aerial surveillance.

In 1976 the Balsam Lake Club donated 3,615 acres (1,463 ha) to the Catskill Center for Conservation and Development, keeping all but the immediate shoreline of the lake itself. Three years later, the Catskill Center in turn sold the land to the state, putting most of the mountain in public ownership. When the first Catskill State Land Master Plan was drafted and implemented in the mid-1980s, the 13,500-acre (5,500 ha) contiguous tract that stretched from Balsam Lake Mountain to Alder Lake over Mill Brook Ridge was designated as the Balsam Lake Mountain Wild Forest, a land classification slightly less restrictive than a wilderness area allowing for state vehicular use of the road up the mountain.

The fire tower remained staffed until 1988, one of the last to be closed. Hikers continued to climb it for the views, even though it was no longer maintained. A proposal by the state Department of Environmental Conservation to dismantle the Red Hill fire tower in nearby Denning led to a community effort to save and restore the five remaining towers in the Catskill Park. In conjunction with that effort, the new Mill Brook Ridge Trail was built from Alder Lake in the west across that mountain's two eastern summits to Balsam Lake, to connect the trail system on the hills above Pepacton Reservoir to the central Catskill trail system and provide another link in the Finger Lakes Trail.

== Access ==
Trails extend to the summit of the mountain from three directions — north, south and west. All approaches eventually put the hiker on the Balsam Lake Mountain Trail (BLMT), the 1.6-mile (2.6 km) loop route over the summit, which follows the jeep road to the north but is a footpath to its south. Two use the Dry Brook Ridge Trail (DBRT), which it connects to at either end.

The most frequently used approach starts at Mill Brook Road and follows the old jeep road to the fire tower. At 2,580 feet (790 m), the road's intersection with the DBRT is the highest trailhead in the Catskills. From there it is 2.75 miles (4.43 km) and 1,120 feet (340 m) to the summit.

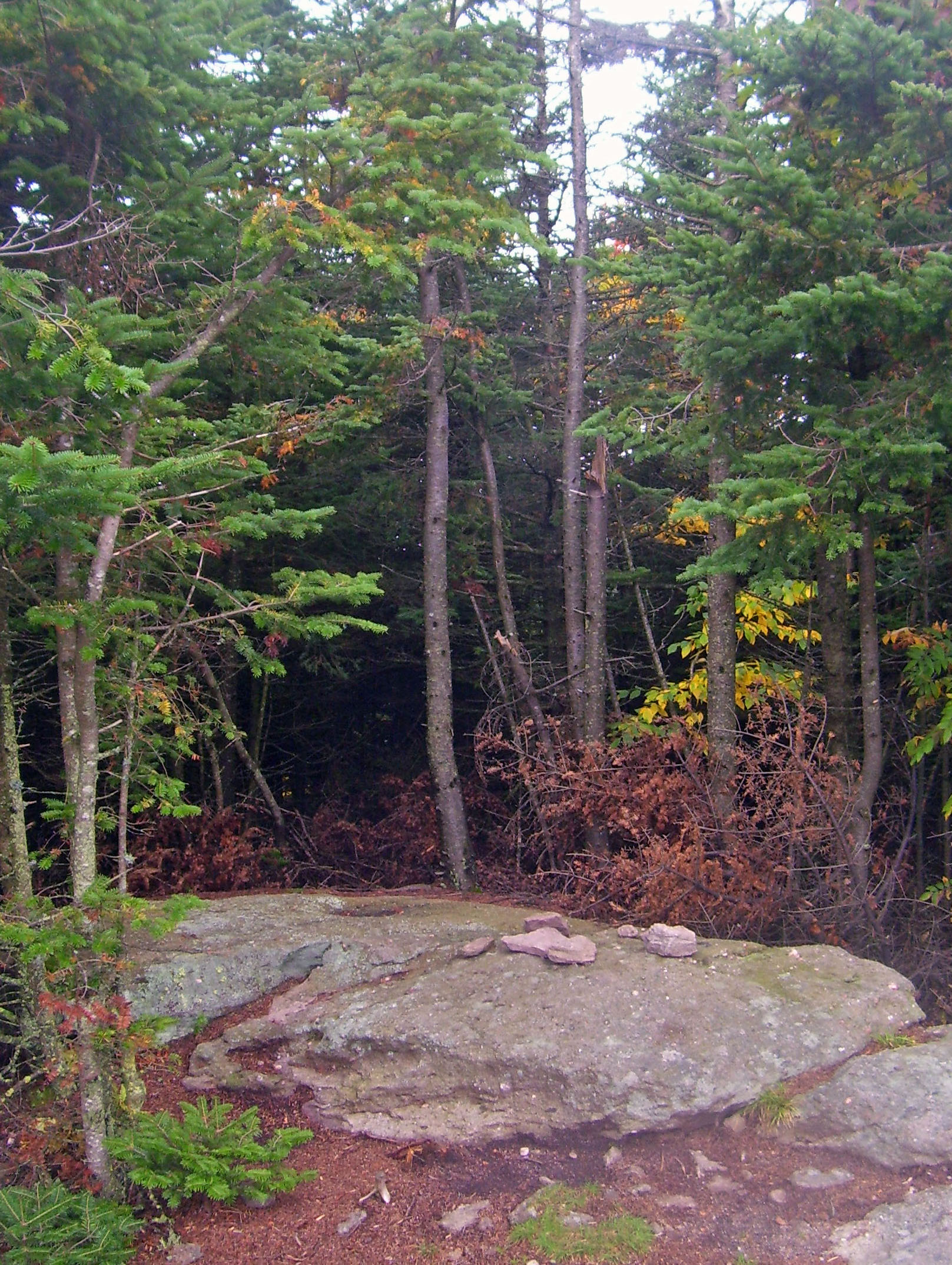
True summit, behind fire tower

From the south, at the end of Beaver Kill Road, the approach is shorter but steeper. The DBRT leads north 0.9 miles (1.4 km) to the south end of the BLMT. From there it is another 0.85 miles (1.37 km) to the summit, past the lean-to and spring. This route's total distance of 1.75 miles (2.82 km) climbs 1,200 feet (370 m).

In 1998, these approaches were joined by the new Mill Brook Ridge Trail, which allows for an ambitious 6.7-mile (10.8 km) approach from the Alder Lake trailhead to the west north of Turnwood. The trail goes over Mill Brook Ridge's two eastern summits, descends into the col between it and Balsam Lake and then climbs to the BLMT just south of the summit. The total ascent is 1,520 feet (460 m). This trail serves mainly to connect the trail network on the Delaware Hills in the western portion of the Catskill Park with its counterpart in the central Catskills.

Prior to the land being closed to the public, nearby Graham Mountain was also a destination for hikers. Sometimes the entire BLMT is used from either north or south to make a loop route of 6 miles (9.7 km) or 4.3 miles (6.9 km) respectively.

DEC regulations forbid camping above 3,500 feet (1,100 m) on the mountain except during winter. There is a lean-to and a spring on a spur trail just below that elevation on the south side. Campers may also use any location more than 150 feet (50 m) from a trail or body of water.

== See also ==
- Catskill High Peaks
- List of mountains in New York
