= Graham Mountain (New York) =

Highest privately owned summit in New York's Catskill Mountains

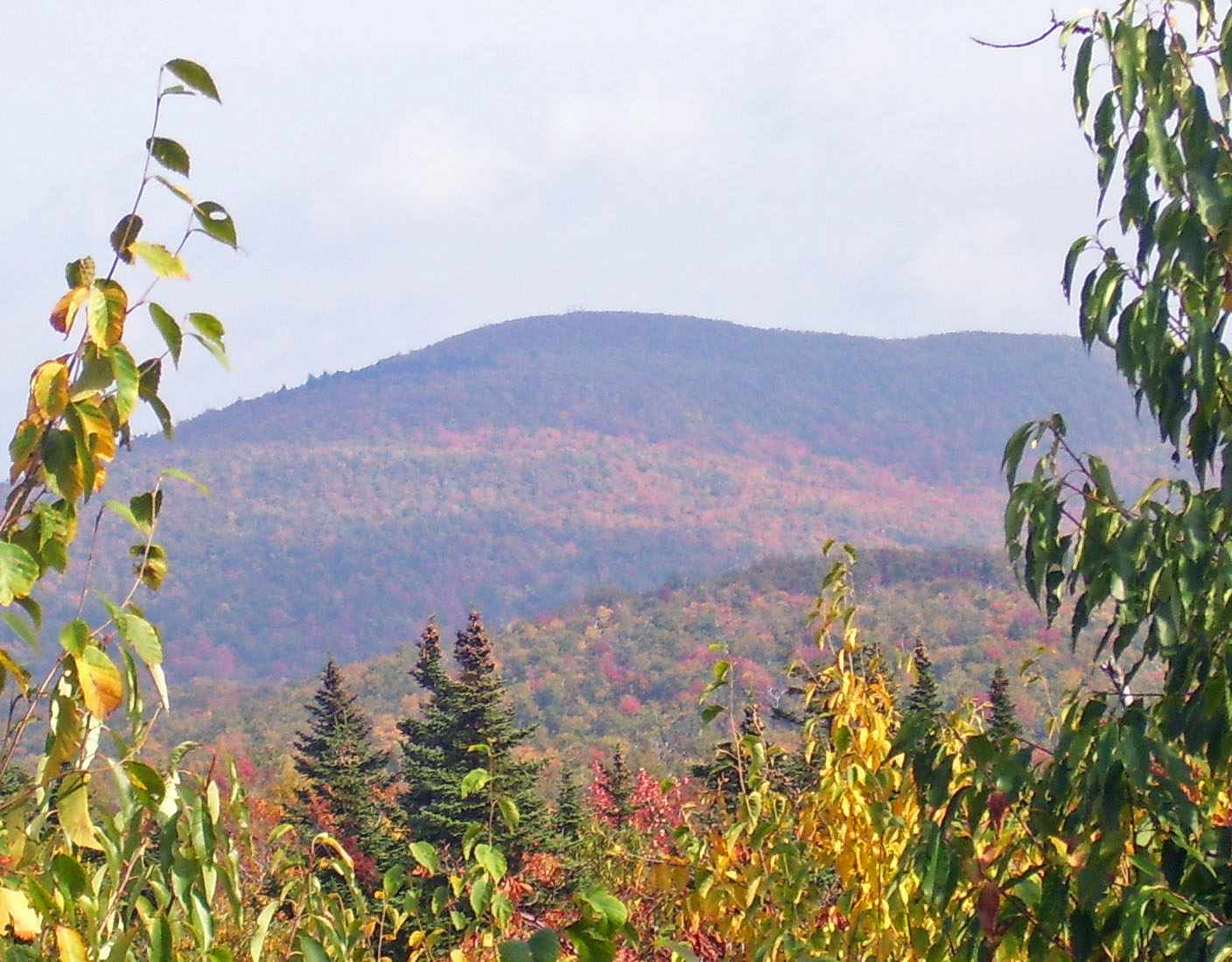
- Graham from west on old jeep trail to Balsam Lake Mountain fire tower

Highest point
- Elevation: 3,868 ft (1,179 m)
- Prominence: 1,188 ft (362 m)
- Listing: Catskill High Peaks #7th
- Coordinates: 42°02′21″N 74°32′59″W

Geography
- Location within New York Location within the United States
- Location: Hardenburgh, New York
- Parent range: Catskill Mountains
- Topo map: USGS Seager

Geology
- Rock age: 250-350 mya
- Mountain type: Mature dissected plateau

Climbing
- Easiest route: Old road to summit

Graham Mountain is the seventh highest of the Catskill High Peaks and the highest privately owned mountain in the range. It is located in the town of Hardenburgh, New York, United States.

Its summit is unique in the Catskills for its pygmy hardwood forest cover and absence of evergreen boreal species that normally dominate at that elevation in the range, despite the presence of balsam fir on the slopes below the summit. In the early 1960s a relay station was built there for Instructional Television, a predecessor to today's Public Broadcasting Service. The relay station was abandoned after a few years and its ruins can be seen from the slopes and summits of neighboring peaks.

Graham is within the Catskill Park. Only part of it is in the state-owned Forest Preserve; the summit and the most common access route are owned by descendants of railroad magnate Jay Gould, a native of the region, who closed the peak to the public indefinitely in January 2021. Prior to then, a successful ascent was required for membership in the Catskill Mountain 3500 Club.

== Geography ==
Graham is near the eastern end of the range beginning at Barkaboom Mountain in Delaware County in the west and centered around the lengthy Mill Brook Ridge. A ridge with two summits known unofficially as East and West Schoolhouse mountains connects Graham with Balsam Lake Mountain, the westernmost High Peak. Between Graham and Doubletop, the Catskills' highest trailless peak, to the east is a steep and deep col 900 feet (270 m) below the summits on either side.

The slopes of the mountain on the north and south alternate between steep hollows carved out by creeks and gentler hollows between them. The largest is Drury Hollow on the north, drained by an unnamed brook that rises far down the slopes. Flatiron Brook to the northeast drains a narrower, unnamed valley. The northwest slopes form the southern wall of Turner Hollow, also drained by an unnamed brook. All three are tributaries of Dry Brook, itself a short tributary of the East Branch of the Delaware River. Since Dry Brook drains into the East Branch above Pepacton Reservoir, this puts the north slope of the mountain within New York City's water supply system.

The southern slopes are gentler, draining to the higher plateau around the headwaters of the Beaver Kill, which itself rises just south of the Doubletop col. Gulf of Mexico Brook drains a narrow valley on the southwest, and Tunis and Vly ponds near the mountain's base also feed the Beaver Kill. The Beaver Kill also, eventually, drains into the East Branch at East Branch, below the reservoir and thus outside of the city watershed.

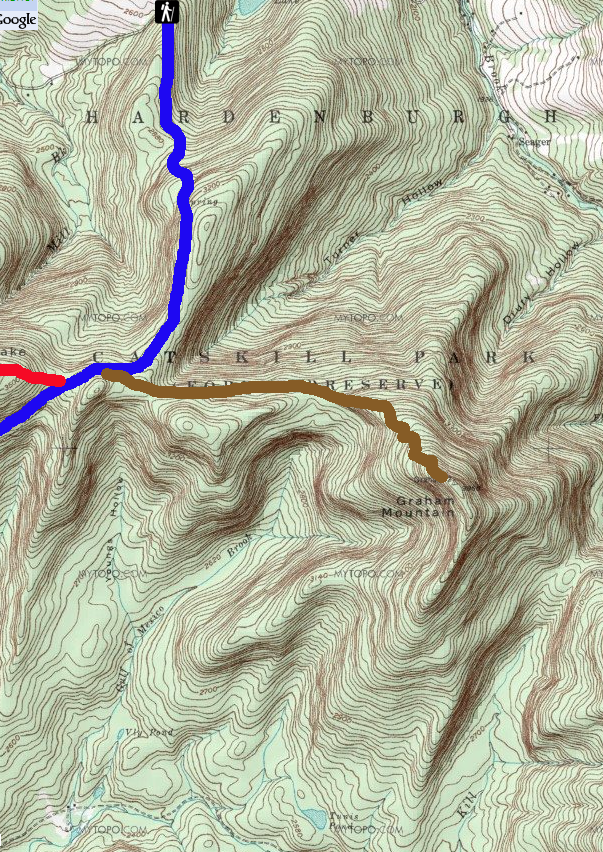
U.S. Geological Survey map of Graham Mountain showing most common access route. Blue is Dry Brook Ridge Trail; brown is old road to summit

Graham's L-shaped summit ridge is narrow, with its spurs pointing northwest and southwest. The United States Geological Survey benchmark indicating the mountain's 3,868-foot (1,179 m) height of land is at the northwest end, near the ruins of the relay station. The southwest end descends gently to 3,660 feet (1,120 m) before dropping off more steeply into the Doubletop col.

The north slopes and most of the summit are within a large tract of land purchased by George Jay Gould I, the son of Jay Gould, a native of nearby Roxbury. Known as Furlow Lodge, it still is owned by the Gould descendants and serves as a family retreat. The south slopes, up to almost 3,500 feet (1,100 m) on the summit ridge's southwest spur, are publicly owned Forest Preserve in the Big Indian-Beaverkill Range Wilderness Area.

== Flora and fauna ==
Most of Graham's slopes, given their high base elevation, are covered in northern hardwood forest of beech, birch and maple. Unlike the other peaks in the range, first-growth forest begins well above 3,000 feet (910 m), as high as 3,545 feet (1,081 m) on one slope. The summit itself is covered with a pygmy forest, unique in the Catskills, with its black cherry and mountain ashes barely taller than average human height. Balsam fir, which dominates the summits of both Doubletop and Balsam Lake mountains to either side of Graham, is found in small stands on the slopes below the summit of Graham.

Catskill forest historian Michael Kudish has studied the range's balsam fir distribution patterns. There are no other peaks where balsam fir occurs on the slopes of the peak, but not the summit, and factors such as elevation, soil, and topography do not suffice to explain the phenomenon. He has concluded that all peaks represent different stages of forest evolution, in which the stunted and twisted ridge hardwoods gradually have replaced balsam fir over the last 8,500 years.

The forests on the mountain support a typical animal community for the Catskills. Black bear and white-tailed deer are the larger mammal species, with many species of rodent, such as snowshoe hare, lower on the food chain. Beavers have been common over the years, with Kudish finding more evidence of present and past dams and meadows on the slopes of Graham and its neighboring peaks.

== History ==
The Catskills were formed 250-350 million years ago, during the Devonian and Silurian periods, when the sands and silt that had eroded from the Acadian Mountains to the northeast collected in a river delta at the mouth of the shallow inland sea that is now the Allegheny Plateau. The delta uplifted as a single unit and gradually streams eroded valleys, creating a dissected plateau. The harder, younger shale and sandstone remains as the mountain summits. Later glaciation made the valleys steeper and smoother.

As with most other peaks in the Mill Brook Ridge range, there was very little human impact on Graham for most of its recorded history. That changed drastically after the construction of Turner Hollow Road in the late 19th century, connecting Seager with the end of Beaver Kill Road, allowing anglers to reach private fishing clubs on the Beaver Kill headwaters from the Arkville Station on the Ulster and Delaware Railroad. Around 1890 George Gould bought the Furlow Lodge tract, including most of the mountain, since his father had enjoyed fishing at the lake so much.

Turner Hollow Road (rerouted to the west in the late 19th century) made the upper slopes of Graham more accessible to logging operations. Their impact on the mountain still is visible to elevations of well above 3,000 feet (910 m), well above their extent elsewhere in the area. One of the last of these took place in the early 1960s, when the relay station was built on a one-acre (4,000 m^{2}) clearing at the summit. A technician and pilot were marooned on the summit for 24 hours after their helicopter crashed there on a maintenance trip during a heavy snowstorm in early 1963. It remained in service for a few more years after that and was abandoned sometime before 1969.

== Access ==
The most frequent route to the summit follows the Dry Brook Ridge Trail from the Mill Brook Road crossing, the highest trailhead in the Catskills at 2,580 feet (790 m). Hikers follow the blue-blazed trail, the old jeep road to the Balsam Lake Mountain fire tower, 1.8 miles (2.9 km) to where the unblazed Old Tappan Road, a relocated stretch of the Turner Hollow Road, forks off to the left at an elevation of 3,340 feet (1,020 m).

At this point hikers leave the trail and its public easement. Permission is required from the Furlow Lodge caretaker to climb from there to the summit of Graham since it is private property; as of January 2021 this is no longer granted since too few hikers had been asking. The Old Tappan Road curves around the side of Turner Hollow, descending 100 feet (30 m) before ascending again after a fork where an older portion of the Turner Hollow Road descends on the left to Drury Hollow. The road ahead continues the gentle ascent until 3,400 feet (1,000 m), where it climbs more sharply up a series of switchbacks, passing some of the balsam firs on the slope at higher elevations.

The summit is marked by a U.S. Geological Survey benchmark with the 3,868-foot (1,179 m) elevation set in a rock at the west edge of the ridge where the road ends. The old relay station, a one-story cinderblock structure with no remaining roof and the three steel supports that can be seen from various viewpoints in the area near the mountain, is at the center of a large clearing. An informal poll of 3500 Club members has found Graham ranks with nearby Eagle as their least favorite summit among the Catskill High Peaks.

There are open views west to Balsam Lake Mountain. Rough use paths lead along the ridge through the pygmy forest to views over the Dry Brook valley and Big Indian, Eagle and Fir mountains to the northwest, and Doubletop and the Beaver Kill's headlands to the southeast.

Other access routes include a bushwhack approach from the Seager-Big Indian Trail along Dry Brook; this usually is combined with an ascent of Doubletop. It also has been hiked in combination with Balsam Lake, for which the hike sometimes begins from the south, at the end of Beaverkill Road north of Quaker Clearing. A direct off-trail hike from there is also possible.

== See also ==
- List of mountains in New York
