= Balsam Lake =

Balsam Lake may refer to:

== Canada ==
- Balsam Lake (Ontario), a lake in the Kawartha lakes region
  - Balsam Lake Provincial Park, on the above lake

== United States ==
Minnesota

- Balsam Lake (Itasca County, Minnesota)

New York

- Balsam Lake (New York), a man-made lake in Chenango County
- Balsam Lake Mountain, part of the Catskill Mountains
  - Balsam Lake Mountain Fire Observation Station, on the above mountain

Wisconsin

- Balsam Lake (Wisconsin), a lake in Polk County
- Balsam Lake (town), Wisconsin, a town in Polk County
  - Balsam Lake, Wisconsin, in the above town
