= Cole Hill =

Mountain in New York, United States

- Location within New York Location within the United States

Highest point
- Elevation: 2,365 feet (721 m)
- Coordinates: 42°08′50″N 74°40′57″W

Geography
- Location: Margaretville, New York, U.S.
- Topo map: USGS Margaretville

Cole Hill is a mountain located in the Catskill Mountains of New York west of Margaretville. Pakatakan Mountain is located east-southeast of Cole Hill and Kettle Hill is located east-northeast.
