= Hardenburgh, New York =

- Town
- Location in Ulster County and the state of New York.
- Coordinates: 42°2′45″N 74°36′47″W
- Country: United States
- State: New York
- County: Ulster

Area
  - Total: 81.02 sq mi (209.85 km^{2})
  - Land: 80.79 sq mi (209.24 km^{2})
  - Water: 0.24 sq mi (0.61 km^{2})
- Elevation: 2,864 ft (873 m)

Population (2020)
  - Total: 221
  - Density: 2.74/sq mi (1.06/km^{2})
- Time zone: UTC-5 (Eastern (EST))
  - Summer (DST): UTC-4 (EDT)
- FIPS code: 36-32116
- GNIS feature ID: 0979046

Hardenburgh is a town located in the western part of Ulster County, New York, United States. The population was 221 at the 2020 census. The town is located inside the Catskill Park.

== History ==
Hardenburgh was established in 1859 from the Towns of Denning and Shandaken. The town was named for Johannes Hardenbergh, a landowner and patentee.

Between 1976 and 1983, 236 residents—more than half the town's residences—became ministers of the Universal Life Church (an organization allowing mail-in "ordinations"), as part of a bid to obtain tax exemptions and as a protest against high property taxes. The ordination movement, which included some subsistence farmers and loggers, were angered at the tax burden that fell on them, which was high because of the thousands of acres of land within the town owned by tax-exempt religious and civil organizations (including the Zen Buddhists' Dai Bosatsu Zendo, the Nassau County Boy Scouts, the Catskill Center for Conservation and Development, and a group of Tibetan monks). Ultimately, in 1982, the New York State Court of Appeals held that Hardenburgh's "mail-order ministers" were not entitled to exemptions from property tax unless the land was exclusively for church use.

The Balsam Lake Mountain Fire Observation Station, Coykendall Lodge, and Grant Mills Covered Bridge are listed on the National Register of Historic Places.

The town is almost exclusively residential; in the 1990s, it had a single general store. The town adopted its first zoning ordinance in 1992.

== Geography and topography ==
According to the United States Census Bureau, the Town has a total area of 81.5 square miles (211 km^{2}), of which 81.3 square miles (211 km^{2}) is land and 0.2 square miles (0.52 km^{2}) (0.28%) is water.

The town is the westernmost town in Ulster County, deep in the Catskill Mountains. It sits north of the town of Denning. A 1907 work described Hardenburgh as having "some of the most rugged and austere natural features" in the county, with a rocky, stony topography ill-suited for agriculture. The landscape is characterized by mountain crags with occasional valley and forestland, and various lakes, streams, and glens. Among the Catskill High Peaks within the town's limits are Graham Mountain, Balsam Mountain, and Eagle Mountain.

Because of the mountains, the only direct route from Hardenburgh to the rest of the county are hiking trails over them. Any vehicular traffic must go through either Sullivan or Delaware counties.

One of those lesser mountains, Dry Brook Ridge, effectively divides the town as well. The portion north of it, in the Dry Brook valley, uses the ZIP code and telephone exchange of the nearby Delaware County hamlet of Arkville. The portion to the south, containing the headwaters of the famous Beaver Kill trout stream, is likewise oriented to the Sullivan County hamlet of Lew Beach to its south, although it contains a few of its own unique toponyms such as Turnwood, its only real road junction.

Alder Lake, a 45-acre impoundment made in the 1900s, is also located in the town.

== Demographics ==
Historical population
Census	Pop.	Note	%±
1860	505		—
1870	628		24.4%
1880	801		27.5%
1890	784		−2.1%
1900	722		−7.9%
1910	598		−17.2%
1920	420		−29.8%
1930	313		−25.5%
1940	326		4.2%
1950	284		−12.9%
1960	252		−11.3%
1970	239		−5.2%
1980	280		17.2%
1990	204		−27.1%
2000	208		2.0%
2010	238		14.4%
2020	221		−7.1%
U.S. Decennial Census 2020

As of the census of 2000, there were 208 people, 95 households, and 57 families residing in the town. The population density was 2.6 inhabitants per square mile (1.0/km^{2}). There were 275 housing units at an average density of 3.4 per square mile (1.3/km^{2}). The racial makeup of the town was 96.15% White, 0.48% African American, 2.40% Asian, 0.96% from other races. Hispanic or Latino of any race were 0.96% of the population.

There were 95 households, out of which 20.0% had children under the age of 18 living with them, 51.6% were married couples living together, 4.2% had a female householder with no husband present, and 40.0% were non-families. 35.8% of all households were made up of individuals, and 15.8% had someone living alone who was 65 years of age or older. The average household size was 2.09 and the average family size was 2.70.

In the town, the population was spread out, with 15.4% under the age of 18, 5.3% from 18 to 24, 26.4% from 25 to 44, 33.2% from 45 to 64, and 19.7% who were 65 years of age or older. The median age was 47 years. For every 100 females, there were 105.9 males. For every 100 females age 18 and over, there were 109.5 males.

The median income for a household in the town was $35,278, and the median income for a family was $41,250. Males had a median income of $27,083 versus $21,389 for females. The per capita income for the town was $19,184. About 12.3% of families and 13.2% of the population were below the poverty line, including 3.3% of those under the age of eighteen and 14.9% of those 65 or over.

== Communities and locations in Hardenburgh ==
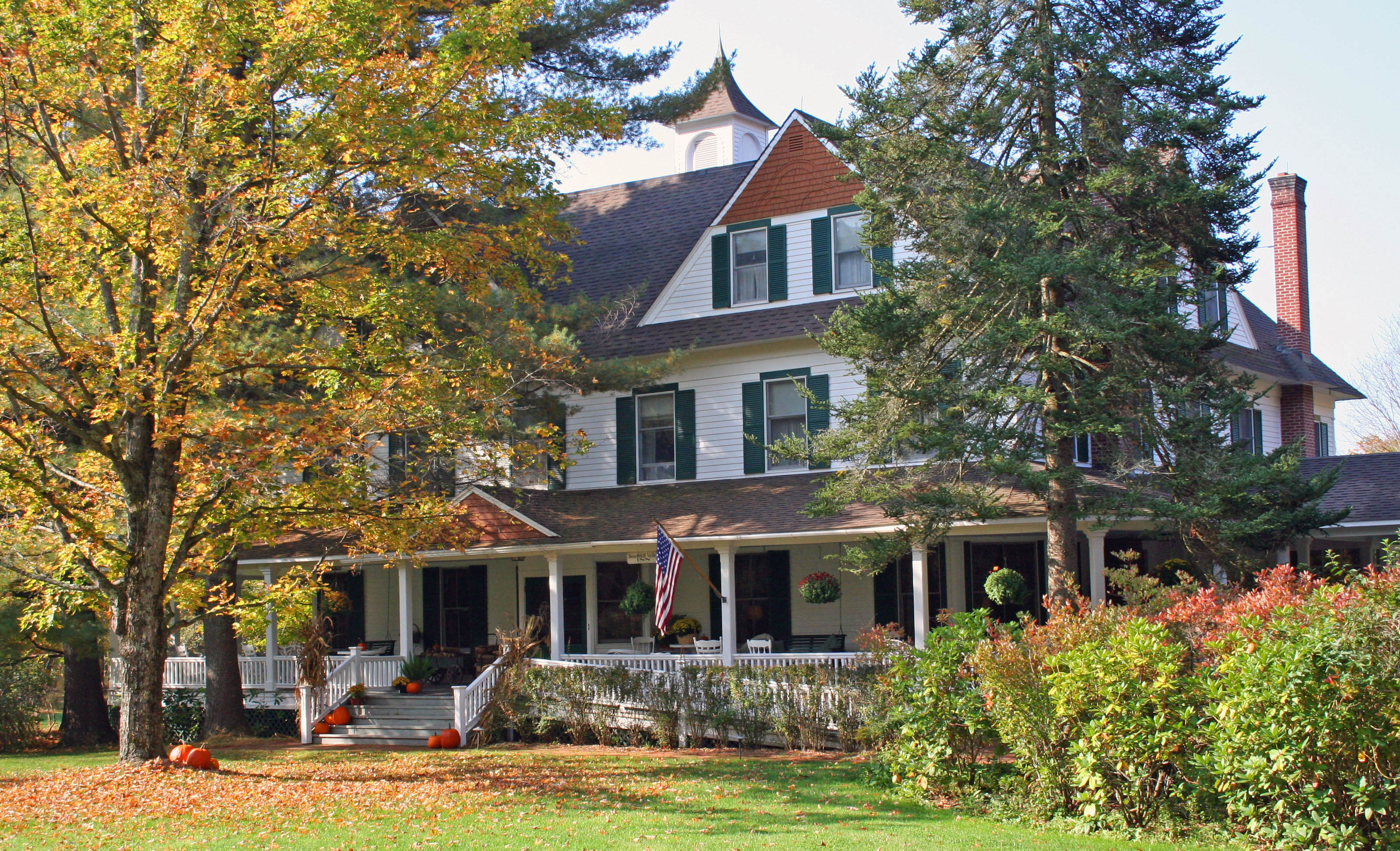
Beaverkill Valley Inn in Hardenburgh

- Beaver Kill – A stream in the southern part of the town.
- Belle Ayre (or "Belleayre") – A hamlet located in the northwestern section of the town.
- Hardenburgh – A hamlet located in the southern part of the town, next to Beaver Kill.
- Mapledale – A hamlet in the northwestern part of the town.
- Seager – A hamlet located in the southeastern section of the town.
- Turnwood – A hamlet located in the western end of the town, located on Beaver Kill and Route 54.
