= Kettle Hill (New York) =

Mountain in New York, United States

- Location within New York Location within the United States

Highest point
- Elevation: 2,195 feet (669 m)
- Coordinates: 42°09′46″N 74°38′31″W

Geography
- Location: Margaretville, New York, U.S.
- Topo map: USGS Margaretville

Kettle Hill is a mountain located in the Catskill Mountains of the U.S. state of New York. It is located northeast of Margaretville. Pakatakan Mountain is located south of Kettle Hill and Cole Hill is located southeast.
