= Pakatakan Mountain =

Mountain in New York, United States

- Location within New York Location within the United States

Highest point
- Elevation: 2,438 feet (743 m)
- Coordinates: 42°08′17″N 74°38′28″W

Geography
- Location: Margaretville, New York, U.S.
- Topo map: USGS Margaretville

Pakatakan Mountain is a mountain located in the Catskill Mountains of New York southeast of Margaretville. Pakataghkan Mountain is the variant name. Kettle Hill is located north, Meade Hill is located east-northeast and Dry Brook Ridge is located southeast of Pakatakan Mountain.
