= Kaatskill Life =

Kaatskill Life

Kaatskill Life is a quarterly regional magazine covering the Catskills of New York. It has been published since its 1986 founding by the Delaware County Times in Delhi. Its most recent edition was published in 2022.

Its coverage area includes Otsego County as well as the more traditional Catskill counties of Delaware, Greene, Schoharie, Sullivan and Ulster. Articles in the magazine cover a wide range of subjects, from outdoor recreation and natural history of the region to local culture and history, often illustrated by color photographs.

"Kaatskill" is the original spelling of "Catskill" as used by the 17th Century Dutch settlers.
