= Woodpecker Ridge =

Mountain in New York, United States

- Location within New York Location within the United States

Highest point
- Elevation: 3,366 feet (1,026 m)
- Coordinates: 42°02′07″N 74°37′01″W

Geography
- Location: Pine Hill, New York, U.S.
- Topo map: USGS Seager

Woodpecker Ridge is a ridge located in the Catskill Mountains of New York southwest of Pine Hill. Mill Brook Ridge is located north of Woodpecker Ridge.
