= Dry Brook Ridge =

Mountain in New York, United States

- Location within New York Location within the United States

Highest point
- Elevation: 2,989 feet (911 m)
- Coordinates: 42°06′08″N 74°35′50″W, 42°07′36″N 74°37′20″W, 42°07′56″N 74°37′45″W

Geography
- Location: Margaretville, New York, U.S.
- Topo map: USGS Seager

Dry Brook Ridge is a ridge located in the Catskill Mountains of New York southeast of Margaretville. Pakatakan Mountain is located northwest of Dry Brook Ridge.
