= Mill Brook Ridge =

Mountain in New York, United States

- Location within New York Location within the United States

Highest point
- Elevation: 3,268 feet (996 m)
- Coordinates: 42°03′15″N 74°38′49″W, 42°02′57″N 74°37′06″W

Geography
- Location: Arkville, New York, U.S.
- Topo map: USGS Arena

Mill Brook Ridge is a mountain located in the Catskill Mountains of New York south of Arkville. Mill Brook Ridge is located north of Woodpecker Ridge.
