= Doubletop Mountain (New York) =

Mountain in New York, United States

- Location within New York Location within the United States

Highest point
- Elevation: 3,860+ ft (1,177+ m) NGVD 29
- Prominence: 880 ft (270 m)
- Listing: Catskill High Peaks 8th
- Coordinates: 42°01′39″N 74°31′42″W

Geography
- Location: Ulster County, New York
- Parent range: Catskill Mountains
- Topo map: USGS Seager

Doubletop Mountain is a mountain located in Ulster County, New York. The mountain is part of the Catskill Mountains. Doubletop Mountain is flanked to the northwest by Graham Mountain, to the east by Big Indian Mountain, and to the southwest by the Beaver Kill Range.

Doubletop Mountain stands within the watershed of the Delaware River, which drains into Delaware Bay. The northeast side of Doubletop Mountain drains into the headwaters of Dry Brook, thence into the East Branch of the Delaware River. The northwest end of Doubletop Mountain drains into Flatiron Brook, thence into Dry Brook. The southwest side of Doubletop drains into the headwaters of Beaver Kill, thence into the East Branch of the Delaware River. The south end of Doubletop drains into High Falls Brook, thence into the West Branch of the Neversink River, and the Delaware River. The southeast slopes of Doubletop drain into Pigeon Brook, thence into Biscuit Brook, and the West Branch of the Neversink.

Doubletop Mountain is within of New York's Catskill State Park.

== See also ==
- List of mountains in New York
