= Balsam Lake (Itasca County, Minnesota) =

Lake in the state of Minnesota, United States

- Location within Minnesota
- Location: Itasca County, Minnesota
- Coordinates: 47°31′48″N 93°24′51″W
- Type: Lake
- Surface area: 716 acres (290 ha)
- Max. depth: 37 feet (11 m)
- Surface elevation: 1,339 feet (408 m)
- Islands: 1 (Balsam Lake Island)

Balsam Lake is a lake in Itasca County, in the U.S. state of Minnesota.

Balsam Lake was named for the balsam fir trees in its vicinity. The lake is composed of four primary sections or bays: the East Bay, Main Bay, West Bay, and Munson Bay (North).

Balsam Lake is connected to six other lakes and a small unnamed lake (or 'pughole') via small streams and creeks: Cutaway Lake, Haskell Lake, Hendrichs Lake, Plantation Lake, Scrapper Lake, and Wilson Lake. These lakes sometimes dammed by beavers and only navigable by canoe during times of low water.

== See also ==
- List of lakes in Minnesota
