= Michael Kudish =

American historian

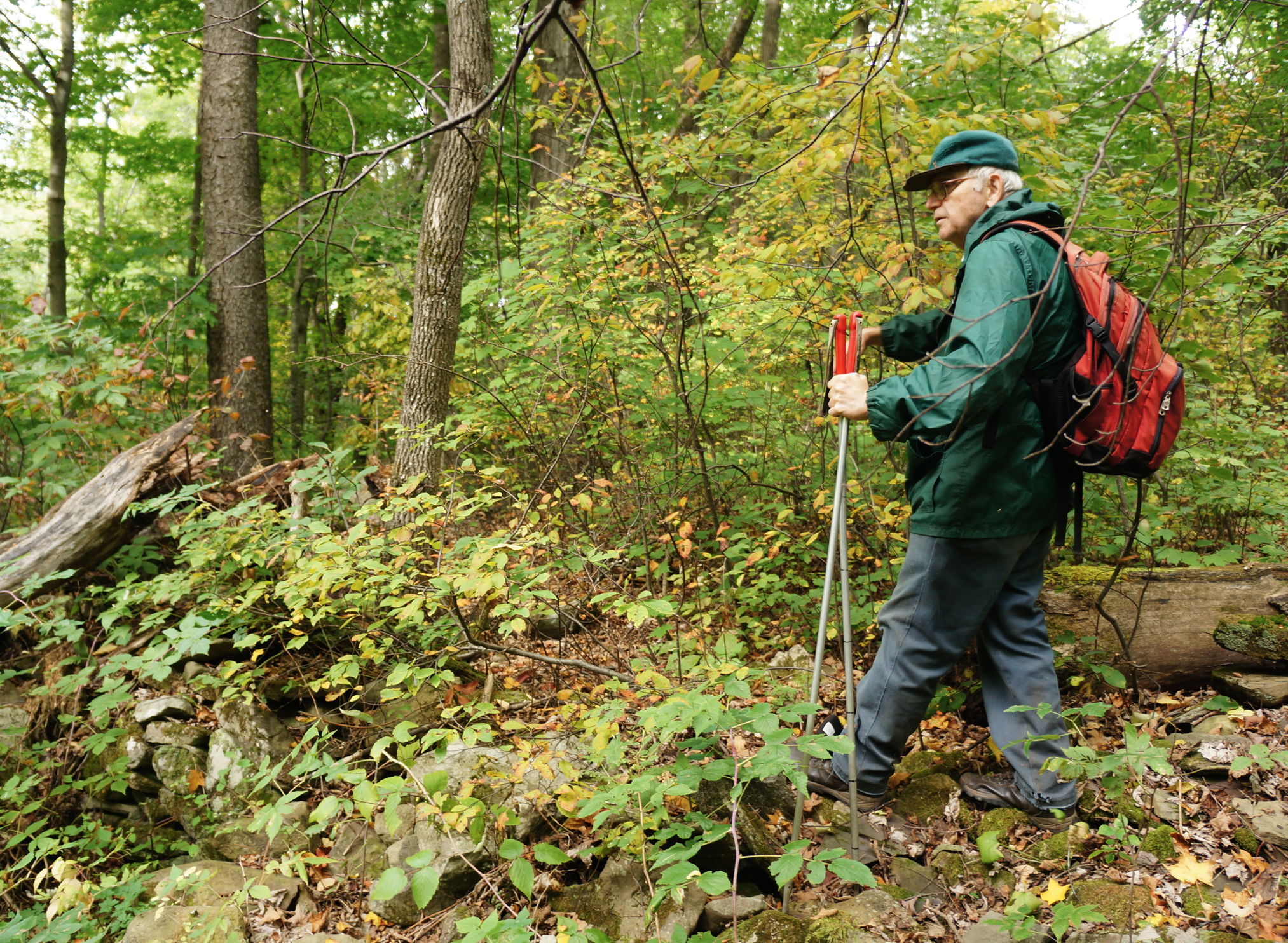
Michael Kudish

Michael Kudish is an author, railroad historian, forest historian, botanist, and retired emeritus professor. He received his Ph.D. in botany in 1971 from the State University of New York College of Environmental Science and Forestry at Syracuse. His dissertation, on the history of Catskill forests, was the beginning of a lifelong study. It was later expanded and published in book form as The Catskill Forest: A History. His previous degrees included a B.S. from the City College of New York, and an M.S. from Cornell University (1968).

As a professor in the Division of Forestry at Paul Smith's College, he has written three books on the flora of the Adirondacks, including Adirondack Upland Flora, as well as a vast number of articles on forest history of both the Catskills and Adirondacks. As a railroad historian, he wrote Where Did The Tracks Go?, an initial description of railroads in the Adirondacks, followed by Railroads of the Adirondacks, for a long time considered the definitive work on the subject. He has since retired from Paul Smith's College, moved to the Catskills, and has completed a four-volume set on the Mountain Railroads of New York State. It updates Railroads of the Adirondacks in the first three volumes, and adds a fourth volume covering the Catskills (with a separate Addendum volume of 55 pages).

The Michael Kudish Natural History Preserve in Stamford, New York, is named for him.

Dr. Kudish's Catskill notes are archived at UVM
