= Seager, New York =

Former village in New York, United States

Coordinates: 42°03′42″N 74°32′41″W

Seager is a former village in Ulster County, New York, United States, within Catskill Park and the Catskill Mountains.

It was a small village that vanished after tanning in the Catskills ended in the late 19th century. Today it consists of one house and a hiking trailhead for the Seager West Branch Trail.
