= Catskill Mountains =

Mountains in southeastern New York, U.S.

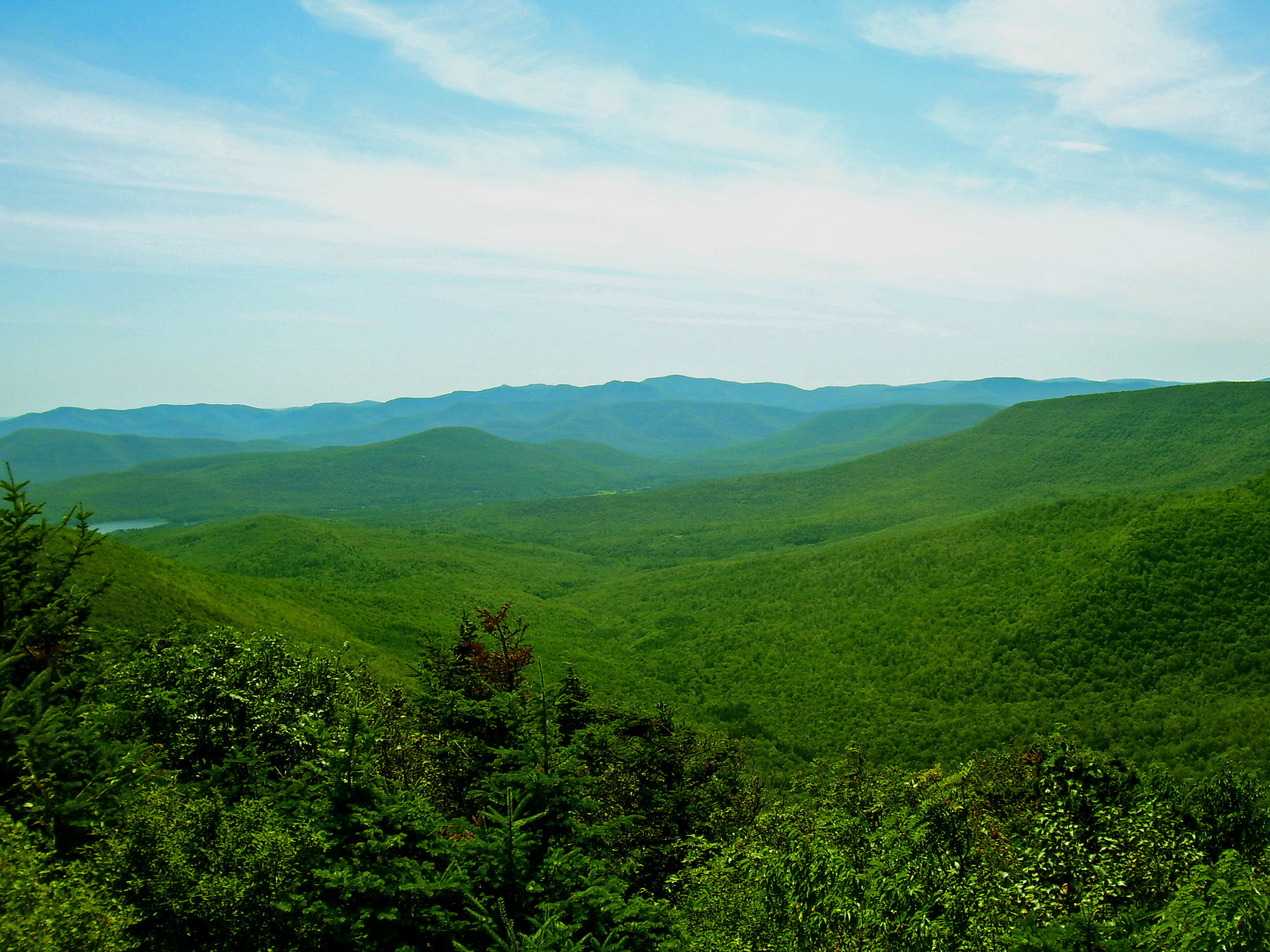
- Slide Mountain and nearby peaks as seen from Twin Mountain in the northern Catskills

Highest point
- Peak: Slide Mountain
- Elevation: 4,180 ft (1,270 m)
- Coordinates: 41°59′55″N 74°23′11″W

Dimensions
- Length: 111 mi (179 km) N/S
- Width: 102 mi (164 km) E/W
- Area: 15,259 km^{2} (5,892 mi^{2})

Geography
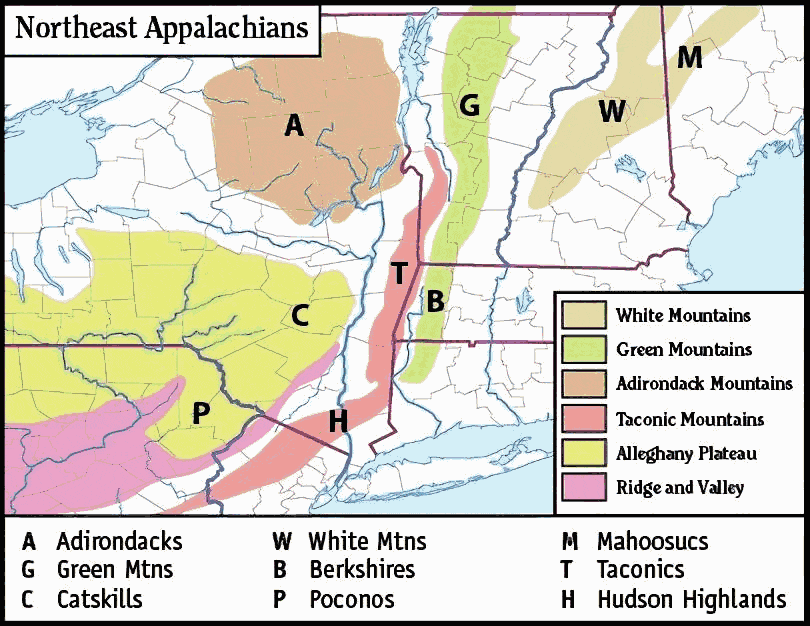
- Main regions of the northeast Appalachians, with the Catskills as "C"
- Country: United States
- State: New York
- Region: Hudson Valley, Southern Tier, Mohawk Valley
- Counties: Delaware; Greene; Schoharie; Sullivan; Ulster
- Rivers: East Branch Delaware River; Esopus Creek; Neversink River; Rondout Creek; Schoharie Creek; West Branch Delaware River
- Communities: Ellenville; Fleischmanns; Hunter; Liberty; Margaretville; Hancock, New York; Palenville; Phoenicia; Shandaken; Shokan; Tannersville; Wawarsing; Windham; Woodstock
- Parent range: Appalachian (Allegheny Plateau)
- Borders on: Poconos; Shawangunk Ridge; Hudson Valley; Great Appalachian Valley; Mohawk Valley

Geology
- Rock ages: Devonian; Mississippian
- Rock type: Sedimentary

The Catskill Mountains, also known as the Catskills, are a physiographic province and subrange of the larger Appalachian Mountains, located in southeastern New York, United States. As a cultural and geographic region, the Catskills are generally defined as those areas close to or within the borders of the Catskill Park, a 700,000-acre (2,800 km^{2}) forest preserve protected from many forms of development under New York state law.

Geologically, the Catskills are a mature dissected plateau, a flat region subsequently uplifted and eroded into sharp relief by watercourses. The Catskills form the northeastern end of the Allegheny Plateau (also known as the Appalachian Plateau).

The Catskills were named by early Dutch settlers. They are well known in American society as the setting for films and works of art, including many 19th-century Hudson River School paintings, as well as for being a favored destination for vacationers from New York City in the mid-20th century. The region's many large Jewish resorts gave many young Jewish stand-up comedians an opportunity to hone their craft. Since the late 19th century, the Catskills have been a haven for artists, musicians and writers, especially in and around the towns of Woodstock and Phoenicia.

== Etymology ==
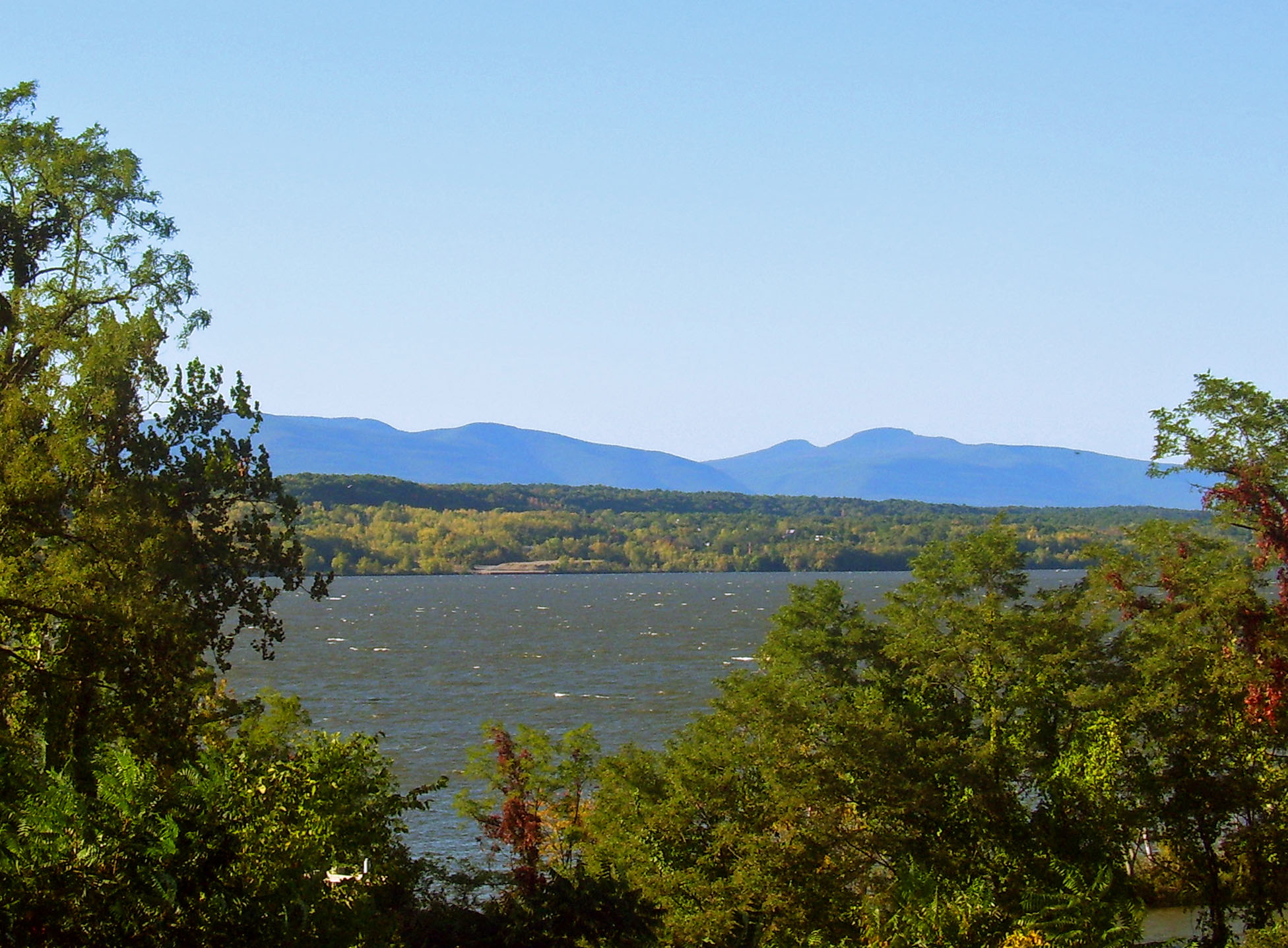
Views of the Catskills from the Hudson like this led to the name "Blue Mountains" for a time.

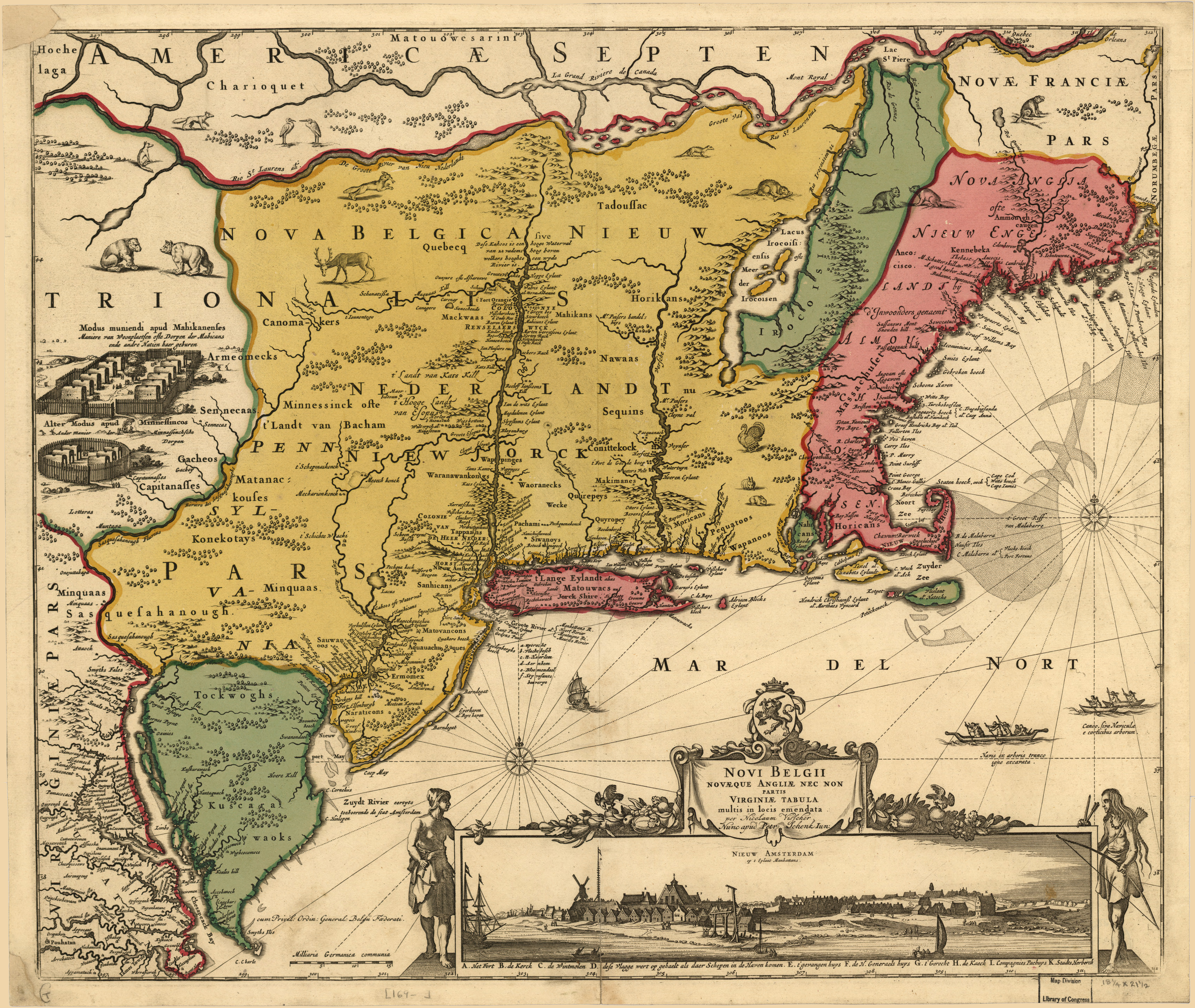
A 1685 revision of a 1656 map of New Netherland showing the locations of the "Lands of the Kats Kills" and the "High Lands of the Esopus"

Nicolaes Visscher I's 1656 map of New Netherland located the Landt van Kats Kill at the mouth of Catskill Creek. The region to the south is identified as Hooge Landt van Esopus (High Lands of the Esopus), a reference to a local band of northern Lenape Native Americans who inhabited the banks of the Hudson and hunted in the highlands along the Esopus Creek.

While the meaning of the name ("cat creek [kill]" in Dutch) and the namer (early Dutch explorers) are settled matters, how and why the area is named "Catskills" is a mystery. Mountain lions (catamounts) were known to have been in the area when the Dutch arrived in the 17th century and may have been a reason for the name.

The confusion over the origins of the name led over the years to variant spellings such as Kaatskill and Kaaterskill, both of which are also still used: the former in the regional magazine Kaatskill Life, the latter as the name of a mountain peak and a waterfall. Henry Schoolcraft is supposed to have coined the indigenous term for the range, On-ti-o-ra ("mountains/hills/land of the sky"), in 1844, due to the term not being attested prior to his record of it.

== Geography ==
The Catskill Mountains are approximately 100 miles (160 km) north-northwest of New York City and 40 miles (64 km) southwest of Albany, starting west of the Hudson River. The Catskills occupy much of two counties (Greene and Ulster), and extend slightly into Delaware, Sullivan, and southwestern Schoharie counties.

At the range's eastern end, the mountains begin dramatically with the Catskill Escarpment rising up suddenly from the Hudson Valley. The western boundary is far less certain, as the mountains gradually decline in height and grade into the rest of the Allegheny Plateau, but maps from the 18th and 19th centuries consistently mark the border of the Catskill Mountains as the East Branch of the Delaware River, which is consistent with the actual topographic relief. The Pocono Mountains, to the immediate southwest in Pennsylvania, are also a part of the Allegheny Plateau.

The Catskills contain more than 30 peaks above 3,500 feet (1,100 m) and parts of six important rivers. The Catskill Mountain 3500 Club is an organization whose members have climbed all the peaks in the Catskills over 3,500 feet (1,100 m). The highest mountain, Slide Mountain in Ulster County, has an elevation of 4,180 feet (1,270 m).

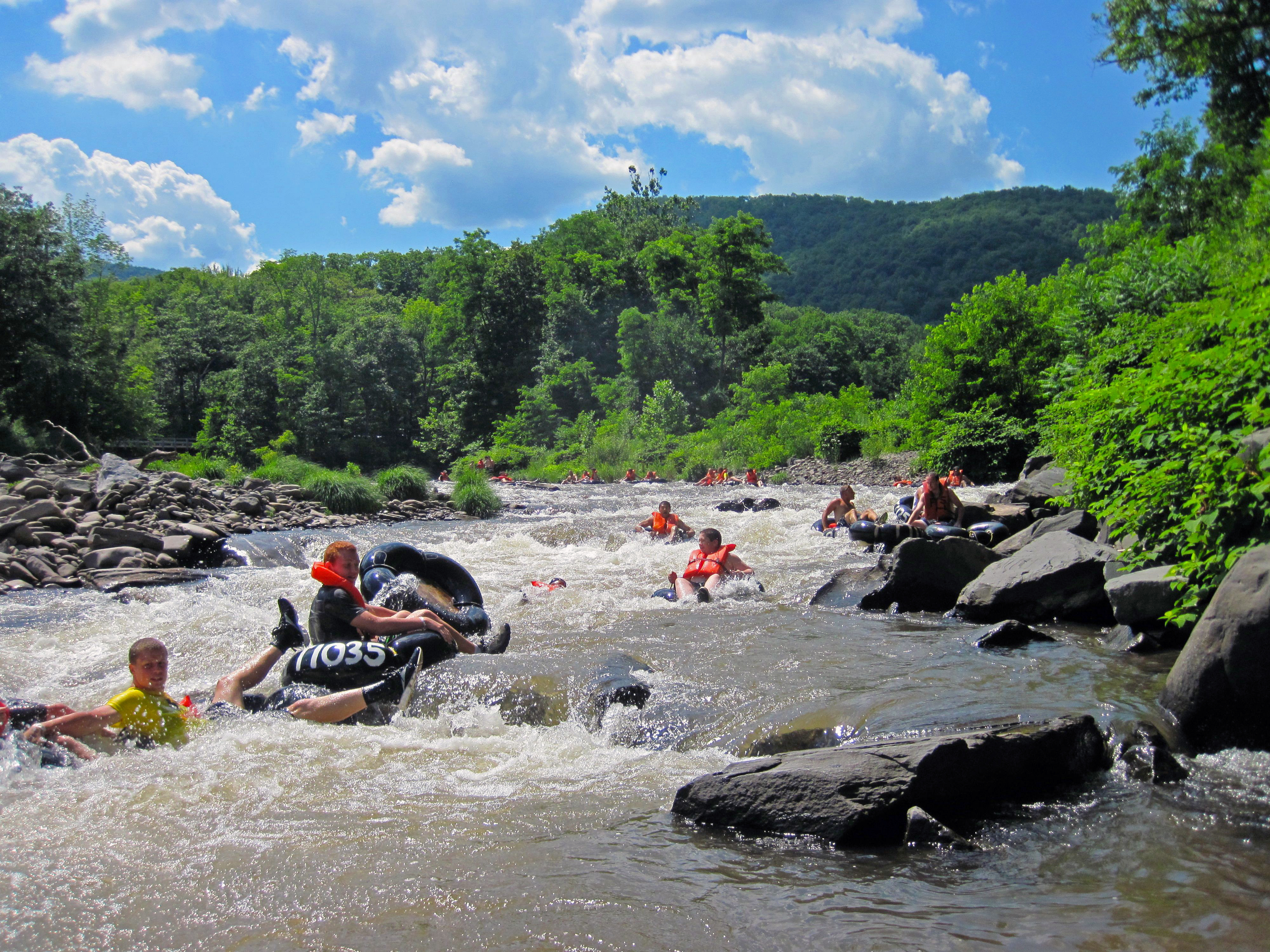
Free-floating tubers on Esopus Creek

Climatically, the Catskills lie within the Allegheny Highlands forests ecoregion.

Climate data for Slide Mountain, NY
| Month | Jan | Feb | Mar | Apr | May | Jun | Jul | Aug | Sep | Oct | Nov | Dec | Year |
|---|---|---|---|---|---|---|---|---|---|---|---|---|---|
Source: National Centers for Environmental Information

== Climate ==
According to the Köppen climate classification system, the Catskill Mountains have two climate zones. The vast majority of the Catskills have a warm summer humid continental climate (Dfb) with some isolated locations in valleys with hot summer humid continental climate (Dfa). The plant hardiness zone on Slide Mountain at 4,180 feet (1,270 m) is 5a with an average annual extreme minimum temperature of −16.6 °F (−27.0 °C). The plant hardiness zone in Margaretville at 1,000 feet (300 m) is 5b with an average annual extreme minimum temperature of −10.6 °F (−23.7 °C).

Climate data for Phoenicia, Ulster County NY. Elevation: 900 ft (274 m)
| Month | Jan | Feb | Mar | Apr | May | Jun | Jul | Aug | Sep | Oct | Nov | Dec | Year |
|---|---|---|---|---|---|---|---|---|---|---|---|---|---|
| Mean daily maximum °F (°C) | 34.4 (1.3) | 37.9 (3.3) | 47.4 (8.6) | 60.8 (16.0) | 71.0 (21.7) | 79.9 (26.6) | 83.4 (28.6) | 82.3 (27.9) | 75.1 (23.9) | 62.8 (17.1) | 51.0 (10.6) | 39.4 (4.1) | 60.4 (15.8) |
| Daily mean °F (°C) | 26.9 (−2.8) | 29.1 (−1.6) | 36.5 (2.5) | 50.5 (10.3) | 60.1 (15.6) | 68.9 (20.5) | 74.3 (23.5) | 71.8 (22.1) | 66.4 (19.1) | 51.0 (10.6) | 41.3 (5.2) | 30.5 (−0.8) | 49.4 (9.7) |
| Mean daily minimum °F (°C) | 18.1 (−7.7) | 20.0 (−6.7) | 27.8 (−2.3) | 40.5 (4.7) | 51.4 (10.8) | 57.9 (14.4) | 62.9 (17.2) | 61.0 (16.1) | 56.3 (13.5) | 42.6 (5.9) | 32.9 (0.5) | 22.9 (−5.1) | 38.4 (3.6) |
| Average precipitation inches (mm) | 3.6 (91) | 3.98 (101) | 3.82 (97) | 4.0 (100) | 3.9 (99) | 3.2 (81) | 2.6 (66) | 2.9 (74) | 3.02 (77) | 3.6 (91) | 3.7 (94) | 3.5 (89) | 46.33 (1,177) |
| Average relative humidity (%) | 69.1 | 66.2 | 59.2 | 55.8 | 60.8 | 67.4 | 70.8 | 70.0 | 71.0 | 69.7 | 69.9 | 69.3 | 66.0 |
Source: PRISM Climate Group

Climate data for Margaretville, Delaware County, NY. Elevation: 1,000 ft (300 m)
| Month | Jan | Feb | Mar | Apr | May | Jun | Jul | Aug | Sep | Oct | Nov | Dec | Year |
|---|---|---|---|---|---|---|---|---|---|---|---|---|---|
| Mean daily maximum °F (°C) | 34.8 (1.6) | 38.3 (3.5) | 47.7 (8.7) | 61.0 (16.1) | 71.4 (21.9) | 80.1 (26.7) | 83.8 (28.8) | 82.4 (28.0) | 75.4 (24.1) | 63.0 (17.2) | 51.5 (10.8) | 39.8 (4.3) | 60.8 (16.0) |
| Daily mean °F (°C) | 27.1 (−2.7) | 29.2 (−1.6) | 36.9 (2.7) | 50.0 (10.0) | 60.2 (15.7) | 69.0 (20.6) | 74.4 (23.6) | 71.9 (22.2) | 66.6 (19.2) | 51.4 (10.8) | 41.8 (5.4) | 30.8 (−0.7) | 49.8 (9.9) |
| Mean daily minimum °F (°C) | 18.4 (−7.6) | 20.1 (−6.6) | 28.0 (−2.2) | 40.1 (4.5) | 51.9 (11.1) | 58.0 (14.4) | 63.5 (17.5) | 61.4 (16.3) | 56.4 (13.6) | 42.9 (6.1) | 33.1 (0.6) | 23.2 (−4.9) | 38.8 (3.8) |
| Average precipitation inches (mm) | 3.6 (91) | 3.63 (92) | 3.8 (97) | 4.0 (100) | 3.9 (99) | 3.2 (81) | 2.5 (64) | 2.9 (74) | 3.0 (76) | 3.6 (91) | 3.63 (92) | 3.5 (89) | 46.32 (1,177) |
| Average relative humidity (%) | 68.5 | 64.3 | 58.5 | 55.8 | 61.6 | 67.4 | 70.9 | 70.2 | 71.7 | 69.9 | 68.5 | 69.8 | 66.0 |
Source: PRISM Climate Group

| Month | Jan | Feb | Mar | Apr | May | Jun | Jul | Aug | Sep | Oct | Nov | Dec | Year |
|---|---|---|---|---|---|---|---|---|---|---|---|---|---|
| Average Dew Point °F | 16.2 | 17.7 | 24.3 | 34.3 | 48.6 | 57.8 | 63.2 | 61.7 | 55.8 | 41.9 | 32.2 | 22.1 | 38.9 |
| Average Dew Point °C | -8.8 | -7.9 | -4.6 | 1.1 | 7.6 | 13.6 | 16.2 | 15.9 | 12.1 | 5.5 | 0.1 | -5.5 | 3.8 |
Source: PRISM Climate Group

== Geology ==
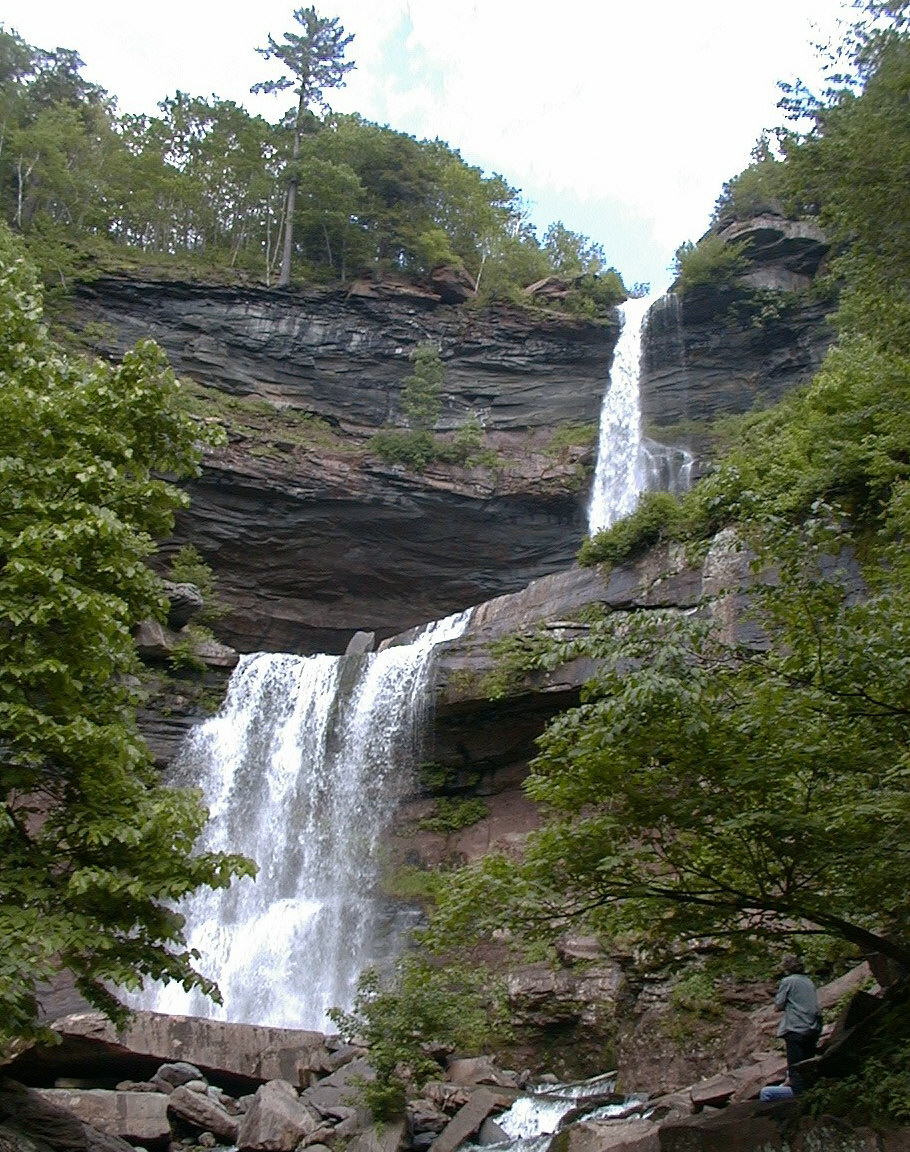
Kaaterskill Falls on Spruce Creek near Palenville, New York. One of the higher falls in New York. Two separate falls total 260 ft (79 m).

Although the Catskills are sometimes compared with the Adirondack Mountains farther north, the two mountain ranges are not geologically related, as the Adirondacks are a continuation of the Canadian Shield. Similarly, the Shawangunk Ridge, which forms the southeastern edge of the Catskills, is part of the geologically distinct Ridge-and-Valley province and is a continuation of the same ridge known as Kittatinny Mountain in New Jersey and Blue Mountain in Pennsylvania.

The Catskill Mountains are more of a dissected plateau than a series of mountain ranges. The sediments that make up the rocks in the Catskills were deposited when the ancient Acadian Mountains in the east were rising and subsequently eroding. The sediments traveled westward and formed a great delta into the sea that was in the area at that time. The escarpment of the Catskill Mountains is near the former (landward) edge of this delta, as the sediments deposited in the northeastern areas along the escarpment were deposited above sea level by moving rivers, and the Acadian Mountains were located roughly where the Taconic Mountains are located today (though significantly larger). Finer sediment was deposited further westward, and thus the rocks change from gravel conglomerates to sandstone and shale. Further west, these fresh water deposits intermingle with shallow marine sandstone and shale until the end, in deeper water limestone.

The uplift and erosion of the Acadian Mountains was occurring during the Devonian and early Mississippian period (395 to 325 million years ago). Over that time, thousands of feet of these sediments built up, slowly moving the Devonian seashore further west. A meteor impact occurred in the shallow sea approximately 375 mya, creating a 10 km (6 mi) diameter crater. This crater eventually filled with sediments and became Panther Mountain through the process of uplift and erosion. By the middle of the Mississippian period, the uplift stopped, and the Acadian Mountains had been eroded so much that sediments no longer flowed across the Catskill Delta.

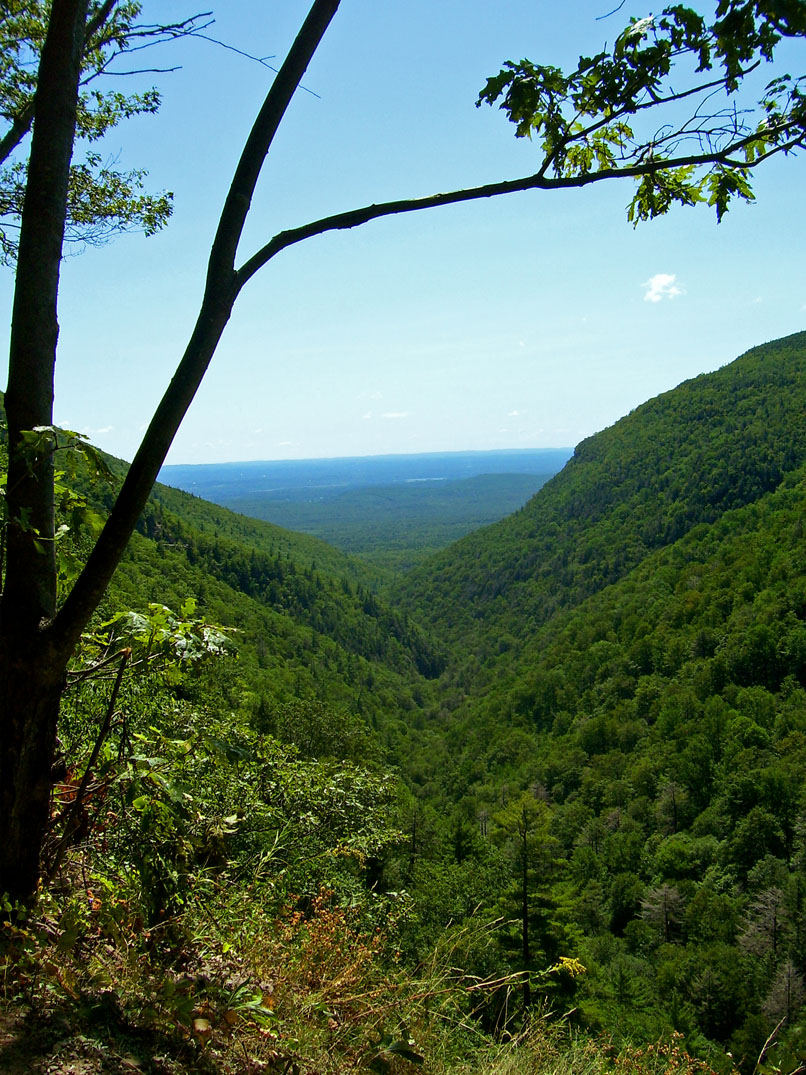
Platte Clove, a break in the Catskill Escarpment created by glacial action

Over time, the sediments were buried by more sediments from other areas, until the original Devonian and Mississippian sediments were deeply buried and slowly became solid rock. Then the entire area experienced uplift, which caused the sedimentary rocks to begin to erode. Today, those upper sedimentary rocks have been completely removed, exposing the Devonian and Mississippian rocks. Today's Catskills are a result of the continued erosion of these rocks, both by streams and, in the recent past, by glaciers.

In successive ice ages, both valley and continental glaciers have widened the valleys and the notches of the Catskills and rounded the mountains. Grooves and scratches in exposed bedrock provide evidence of the great sheets of ice that once traversed the region. Even today the erosion of the mountains continues, with the region's rivers and streams deepening and widening the mountains' valleys and cloves.

== Recreation ==
=== The Borscht Belt ===
In the mid–20th century, summer resorts in the Catskills, nicknamed the Borscht Belt, were a major vacation destination for Jewish New Yorkers. At its peak of popularity, about 500 resorts operated in the region. The resorts offered luxurious amenities that drew customers in, such as elite entertainers and all-you-can-eat meals. Later changes in vacationing patterns have led most of those travelers elsewhere, although there are still some bungalow communities and summer camps in the region catering to Orthodox Jewish populations.

=== Aquatic sports and recreation ===
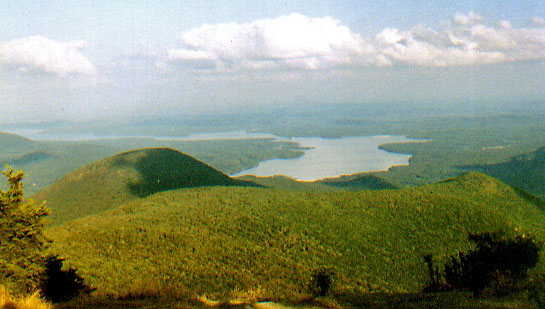
The Ashokan Reservoir as seen from Wittenberg Mountain

Esopus Creek is a 65.4-mile (105.3 km) tributary of the Hudson River, starting at Winnisook Lake on Slide Mountain. It flows across Ulster County to the Hudson River at Saugerties. The Esopus is noted for making an almost 270-degree turn around Panther Mountain, following a buried 6-mile (10 km) impact crater rim. It is famous for tubing, a sport of rafting down a river in an inner tube. Many tubers begin their trip at Phoenicia, New York, and head down the creek towards the Ashokan Reservoir at Olive, New York.

The Ashokan Reservoir is part of the New York City water supply system, with fishing allowed under permit, but ice fishing is prohibited. It is the most famous New York City-owned reservoir for rainbow trout.

River canoeing and kayaking are popular. There are 42 rapids ranging from class I to V+.

The Esopus Creek is famous for its fly fishing, although in recent years it has been plagued by invasive plants.

=== Cycling ===
Road and mountain biking are fairly popular in the range. Bicycle racing includes the Tour of the Catskills, a three-day road stage race held in Greene and Ulster counties each summer, and the UCI Mountain Bike World Cup in Windham. Other cycling resources include the Catskill Scenic Trail, the Headwaters Trails in Stamford and the Roundtopia trail network (mapped by the Round Top Mountain Bike Association). Several ski centers provide downhill mountain bicycling in the warmer months.

=== Hiking and camping ===
Within the range is the Catskill Park, comprising over 700,000 acres (280,000 ha). Catskill Park is part of New York's Forest Preserve. Not all the land is publicly owned; about 60% remains in private hands, but new sections are added frequently. Most of the park and the preserve are within Ulster County, with a significant portion in Greene County, and parts in Sullivan and Delaware counties as well. Many of the trails in public areas are maintained and updated by the New York–New Jersey Trail Conference and the Catskill Mountain 3500 Club.

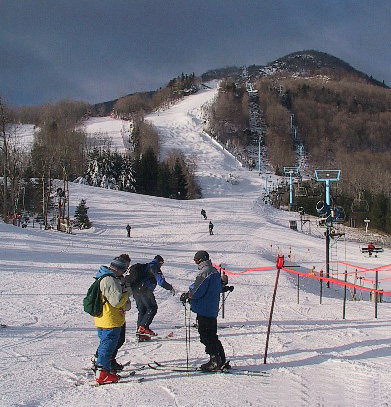
Hunter Mountain

Devil's Path is one of the many trails open for hikers. Spots to camp in the Catskills include Bear Spring Mountain, Little Pond, Mongaup Pond, and North-South Lake.

=== Skiing ===
There are five main downhill ski and snowboard areas in the Catskills: Belleayre Mountain (run by the Olympic Regional Development Authority); Hunter Mountain (the first ski area to install snowmaking machines in New York); Windham Mountain; Holiday Mountain Ski and Fun in Monticello; and Plattekill Mountain in Roxbury.

Joppenbergh Mountain, in Rosendale Village hosted its first ski jumping competition in 1937. Ski jumping was continued on the mountain until February 7, 1971, when the last competition was held.

The Mountain Trails Cross Country Ski Center in Tannersville has 22 miles (35 km) of trails.

== Structures ==
=== Fire towers ===
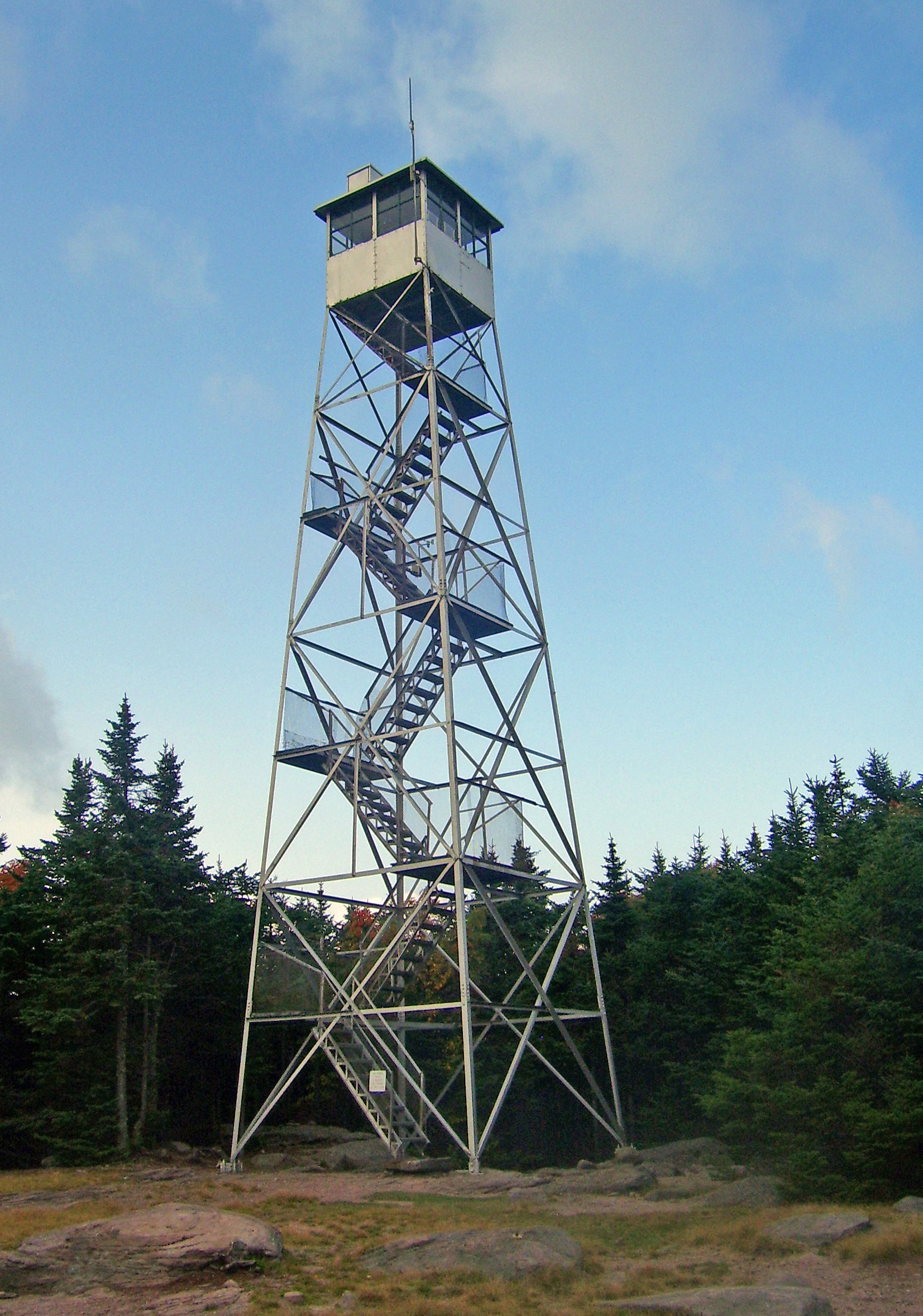
Balsam Lake Mountain fire tower in 2008

The Catskill Mountains fire towers were constructed to facilitate forest fire prevention and control. Twenty-three fire towers were built in the Catskill Mountains between 1908 and 1950. The fire towers fell out of use by the 1970s as fire spotting from airplanes had become more effective and efficient, so the fire towers were decommissioned; the Hunter Mountain Fire Tower was the last to be taken out of service in 1990.

Six remaining towers were renovated and opened to the public as observation posts with panoramic views and a tower was opened at the Catskill Visitor Center in 2022. In 2024 a tower was restored to Bramley Mountain, bringing the count to eight. The current towers are:

- Balsam Lake Mountain Fire Observation Station near Hardenburgh, elevation 3,723 ft (1,135 m)
- Hunter Mountain Fire Tower near Hunter, elevation 4,042 ft (1,232 m)
- Mt. Utsayantha Fire Tower near Stamford, New York, elevation 3,214 ft (980 m)
- Overlook Mountain Tower near Woodstock, elevation 3,140 ft (960 m)
- Red Hill Fire Observation Station near Denning, elevation 2,990 ft (910 m)
- Mount Tremper Fire Observation Station near Shandaken, elevation 2,740 ft (840 m)
- Upper Esopus Fire Observation Station near Mount Tremper, elevation 678 ft (207 m)
- Bramley Mountain Fire Tower near Bloomville, elevation 2,892 ft (881 m)

=== Notable landmarks ===
The Catskill Mountain House, built in 1824, was a hotel near Palenville, New York, in the Catskill Mountains overlooking the Hudson River Valley. In its prime at the turn of the century, visitors included United States Presidents Ulysses S. Grant, Chester A. Arthur and Theodore Roosevelt.

== Transportation ==
From 1872, the northern part of the Catskills were served by the Catskill Mountain Branch of the Ulster and Delaware Railroad which was absorbed into the New York Central railroad in 1932. Oneonta to Kingston passenger rail service continued until 1954. Part of the line still exists but now serves only freight.

The southern part of the Catskills was served by the New York, Ontario and Western Railway. Over the course of 1950, service on the NYO&W downscaled to summer only. In its last years it ran trains from Roscoe to Weehawken, New Jersey, via Liberty. It connected with the New York Central's West Shore Railroad at Cornwall. This service lasted until September 10, 1953.

The Delaware and Ulster Railroad is a heritage railroad, based in Arkville, New York, that still runs a scenic part of the track from Highmount to Hubbell Corners, New York, for tourist use. The Catskill Mountain Railroad is also a heritage railroad in the Catskills, operating from Kingston up to Highmount.

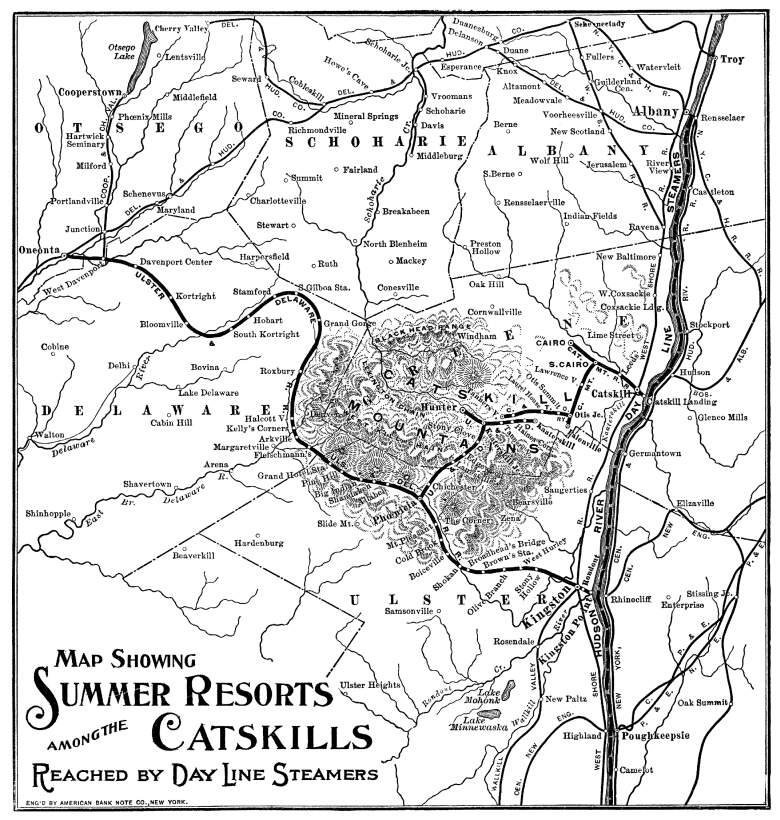
A map of the railroads in the Catskills. Despite what the map says, nearly the entirety of this map is of the Catskills. East of the Hudson River are The Berkshires and the Taconic Mountains, and to the far north (central and northern Albany County, and far-northern Schoharie County) are the Appalachians.

The Catskills are accessible by automobile from the east along Interstate 87/New York State Thruway, which runs north–south through the Hudson Valley. To the south and southwest, the Catskills are accessible by a variety of highways, including New York State Route 55, U.S. Route 44, U.S. Route 209, and New York State Route 17. Access to the western Catskills is provided by New York State Route 30; and the vaguely defined far-western edge of the region is variously considered to be New York State Route 10 or Interstate 88, though this boundary remains a matter of local preference. New York State Routes 28 and 23A cut east–west through the heart of the Catskills, serving many of the most popular outdoor tourist destinations. New York State Route 23 runs east–west across the Catskills' northern section.

Governor Kathy Hochul supports plans for the New York State Department of Transportation to improve highway transportation for New York State car drivers driving on New York Route 17 in the New York Catskills Region. It will cost $1.3 billion. Environmentalists and transportation planners do not like the plan.

The closest major airports to the Catskill region are Albany International Airport to the north and Stewart International Airport in Newburgh to the south. Smaller airports in the region include:

- Columbia County Airport in Hudson
- Dutchess County Airport in Poughkeepsie
- Joseph Y. Resnick Airport in Ellenville
- Kingston–Ulster Airport
- Kobelt Airport in Wallkill
- Randall Airport in Middletown
- Sullivan County International Airport in Monticello
- Wurtsboro–Sullivan County Airport

== In popular culture ==
The Catskills serve as the setting for many works of fiction, such as the short story Rip Van Winkle, and the children's book My Side of the Mountain. The Hudson Valley Film Commission maintains a list of films set in the Hudson Valley/Catskills Region. Of them, more than three dozen films are set in the Catskills.

The town of Bethel, New York, located in the Catskills, was home to the famous Woodstock music festival that took place August 15–18, 1969. The event, wherein 32 music acts performed in front of over 500,000 concert-goers, was captured in the documentary movie Woodstock (1970). The site is now home to the world-renowned Bethel Woods Center for the Arts.

The many hotels and vacation resorts located in the Catskills are notable in American cultural history for their role in the development of modern stand-up comedy. Comedians such as Rodney Dangerfield, Jackie Mason, Alan King, and Don Rickles all got their start performing in Catskill hotel venues colloquially referred to as the Borscht Belt.

Gallery of paintings and photographs

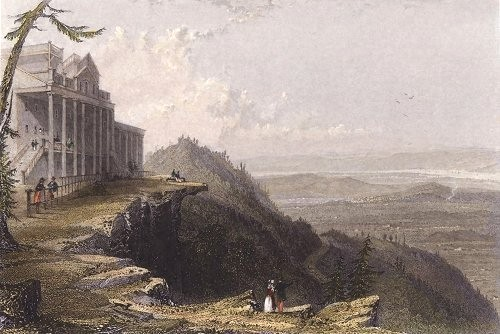
View from The Mountain House (1836), painting by William Henry Bartlett

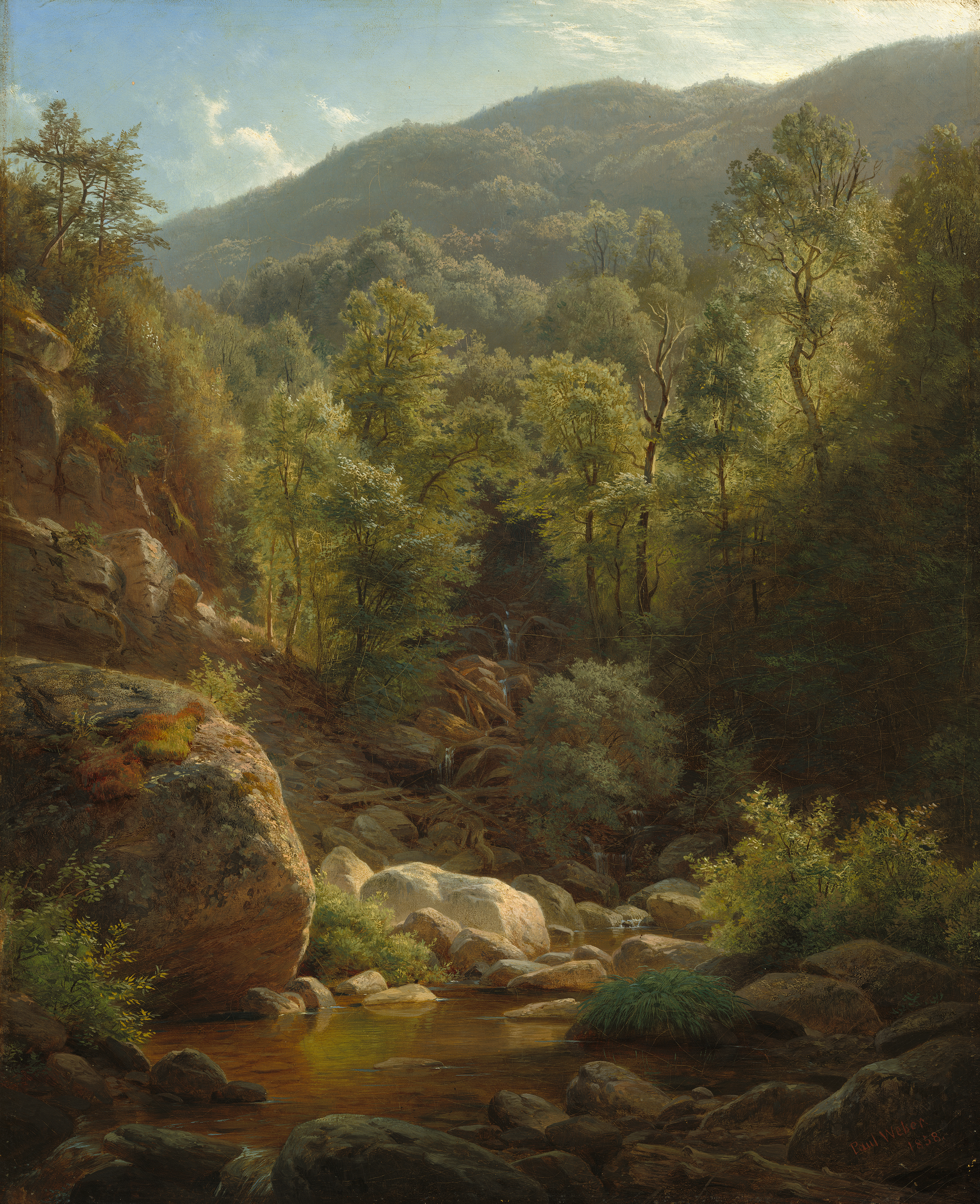
Paul Weber, Scene in the Catskills, 1858

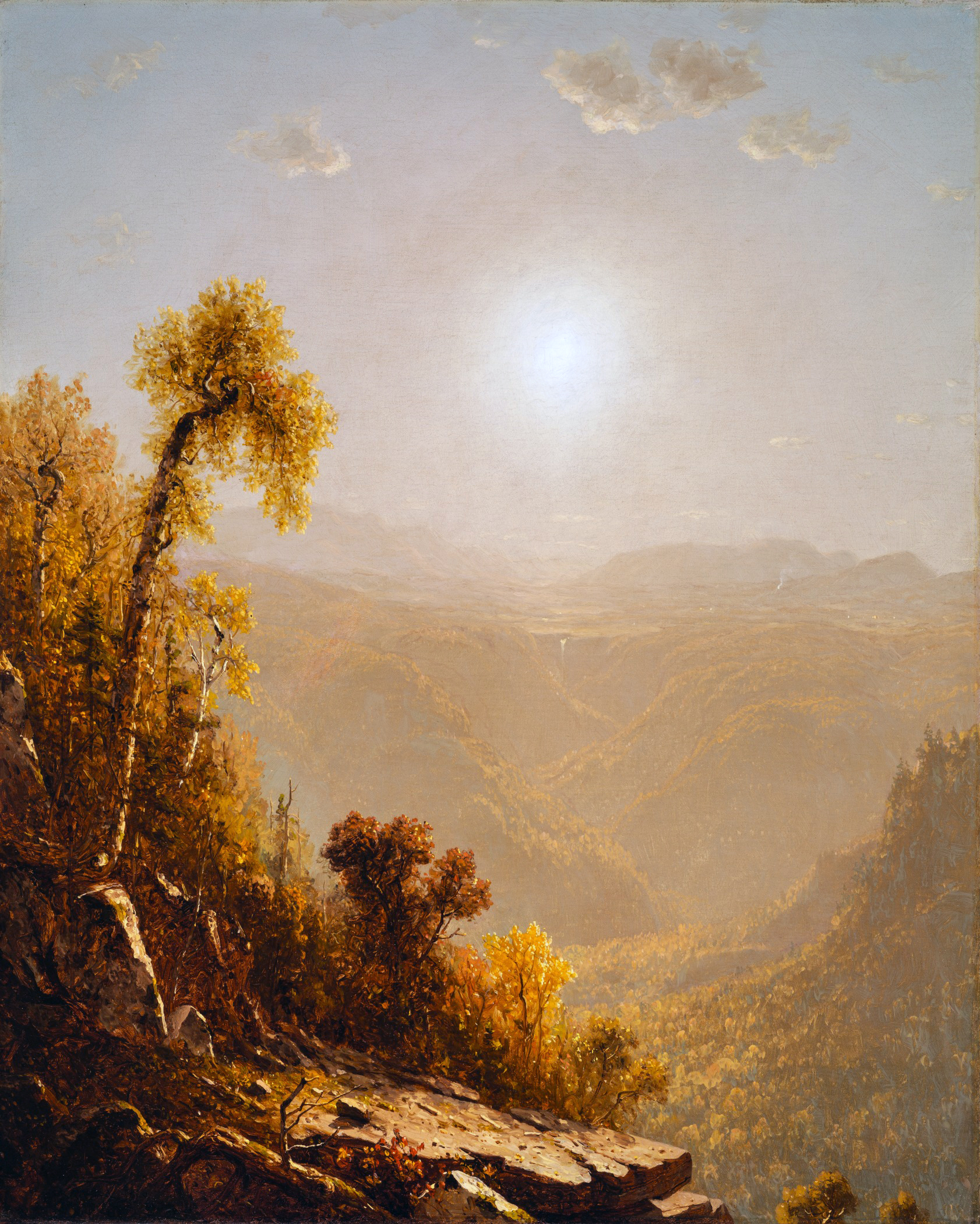
October in the Catskills, 1880 painting by Sanford Robinson Gifford

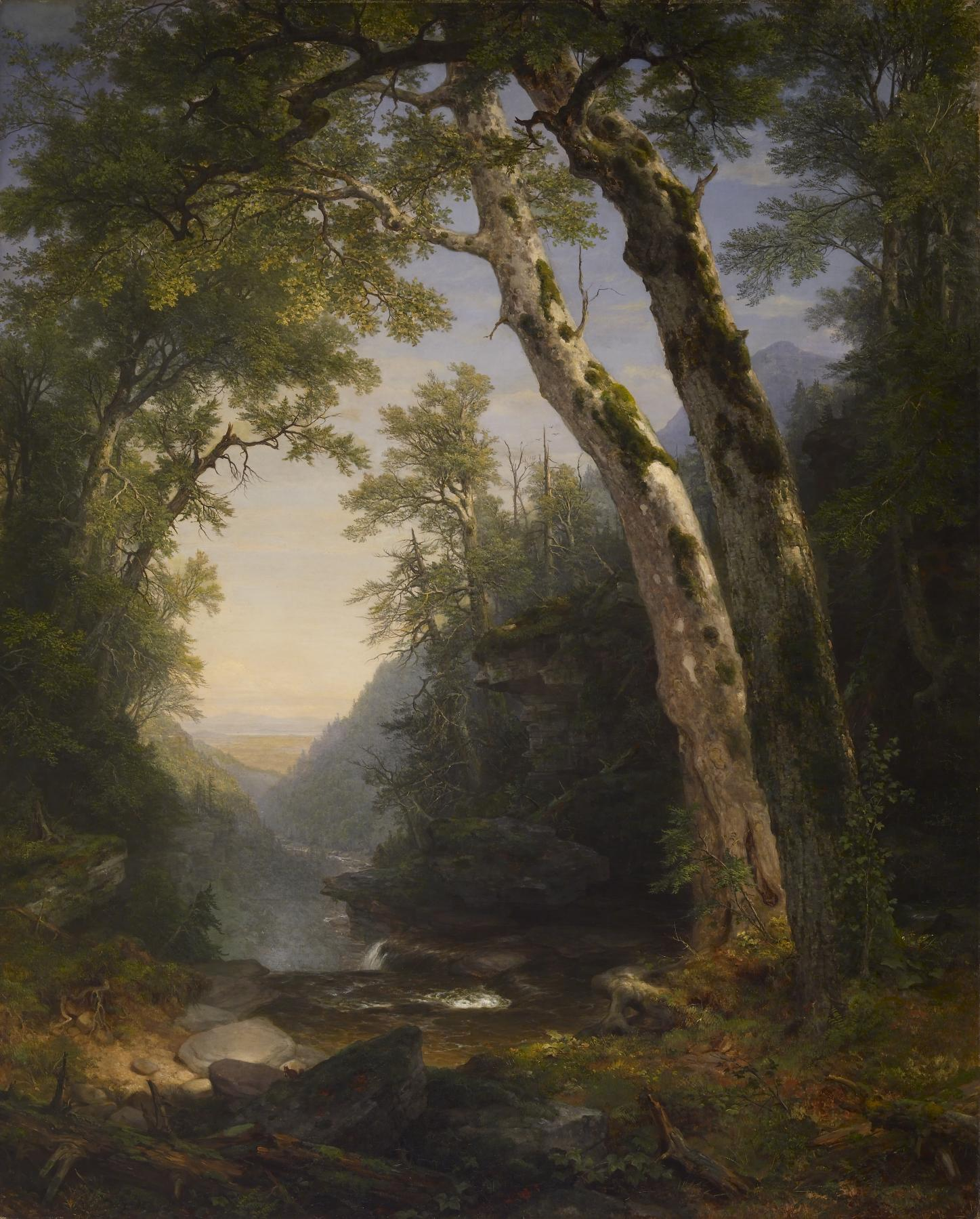
The Catskills, 1859 painting by Asher Brown Durand depicting the Catskills using the "sublime landscape" approach

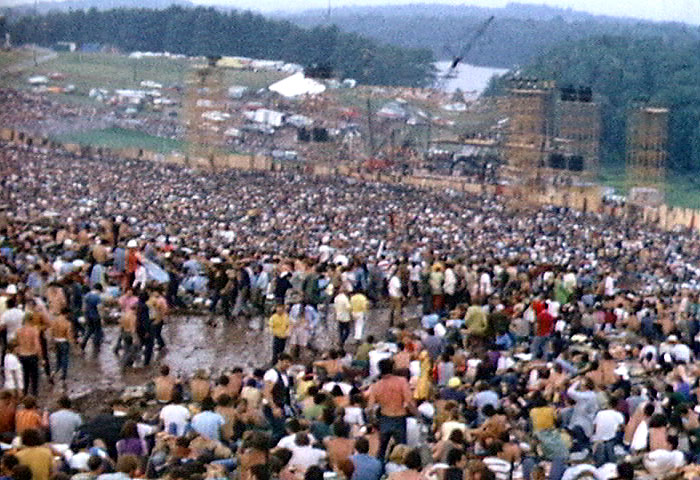
The Redmond Stage, Woodstock music festival, 1969

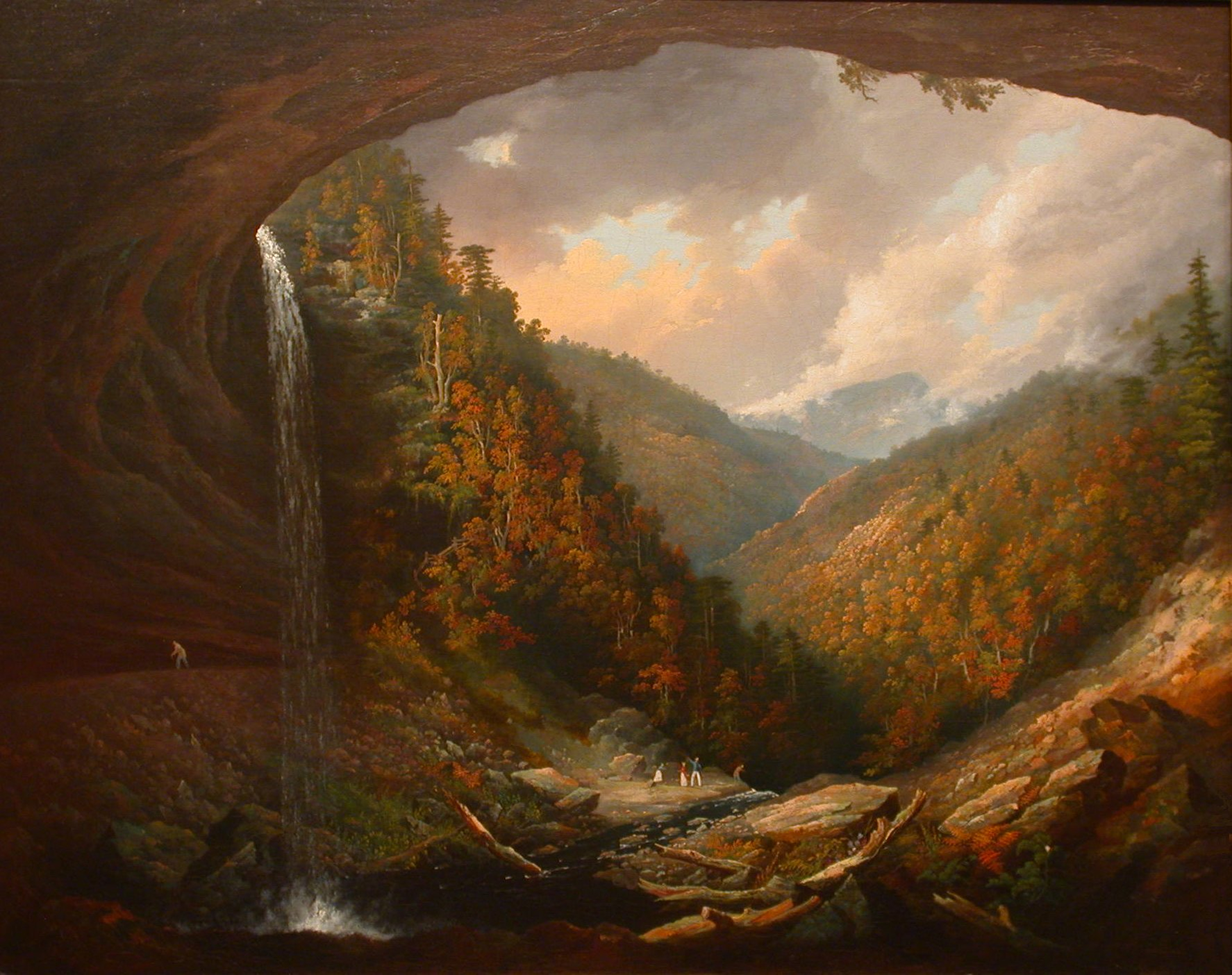
Kaaterskill Falls on the Catskill Mountains (1826–27), painting by William Guy Wall, Honolulu Museum of Art

== See also ==
- Helderberg Escarpment
- List of subranges of the Appalachian Mountains
- Resorts World Catskills
