= List of mountains of New York (state) =

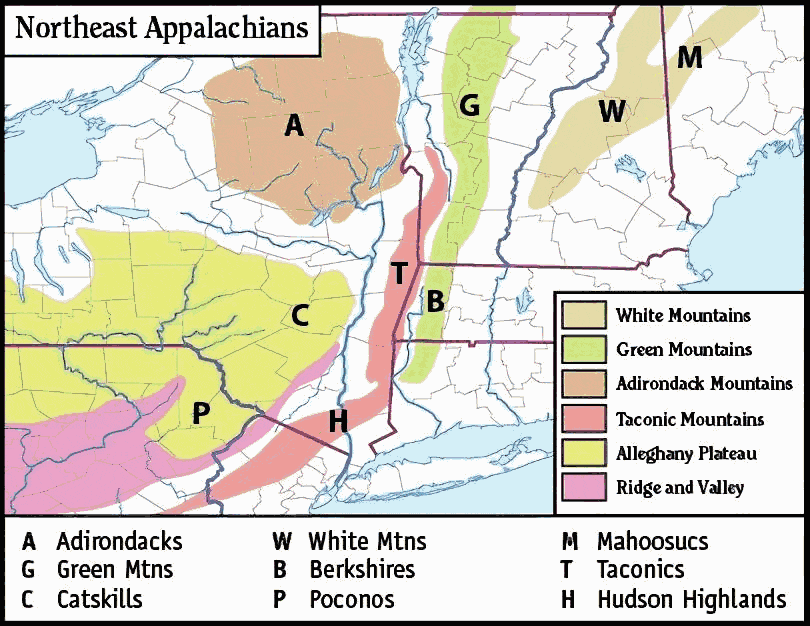
Mountain ranges of New York and the North-East.

There are three major mountain ranges in New York: the Adirondack Mountains, the Catskill Mountains, and part of the Appalachian Mountains.

== Adirondack Mountains ==
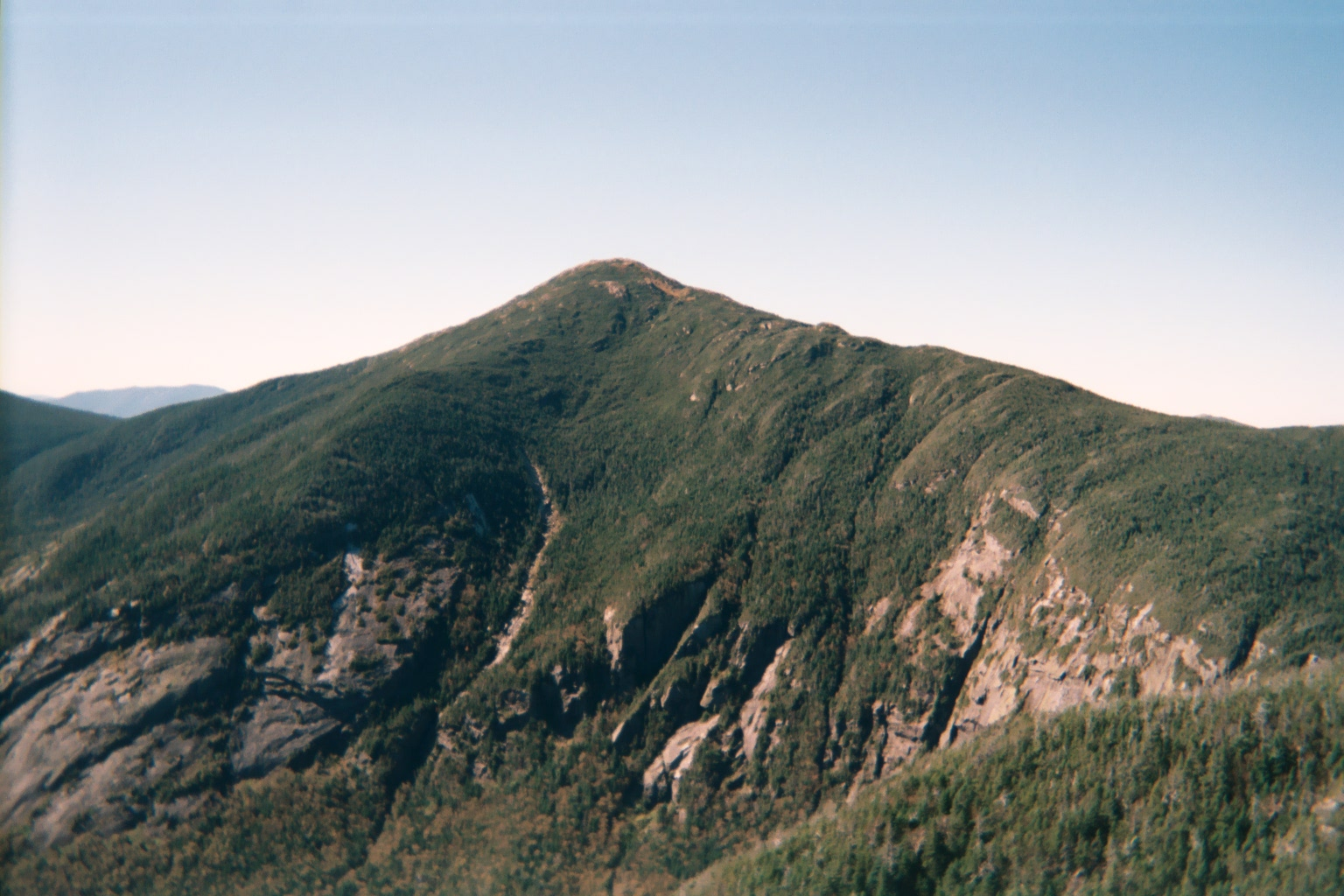
Mount Marcy from Mount Haystack.

The Adirondack Mountains are sometimes considered part of the Appalachians but, geologically speaking, are a southern extension of the Laurentian Mountains of Canada. The Adirondacks do not form a connected range, but are an eroded dome consisting of over one hundred summits, ranging from under 1,200 feet (366 m) to over 5,000 feet (1,524 m) in altitude.

The highest of the Adirondack mountains are listed in the Adirondack High Peaks. Other mountains in the Adirondacks include:

- Ampersand Mountain
- Avalanche Mountain
- Averill Peak
- Baker Mountain
- Bald Mountain
- Baxter Mountain
- Bitch Mountain
- Black Mountain
- Blue Mountain
- Blue Ridge Mountain
- Boreas Mountain
- Brown Pond Mountain
- Buell Mountain
- Bullhead Mountain
- Calamity Mountain
- Cathead Mountain
- Cellar Mountain
- Cheney Cobble
- Coney Mountain
- Crane Mountain
- Dun Brook Mountain
- Fishing Brook Mountain
- Fishing Brook Range
- Floodwood Mountain
- Gore Mountain
- Green Mountain
- Hackensack Mountain
- Henderson Mountain
- Hoffman Mountain
- Hurricane Mountain
- Jay Mountain
- Jenkins Mountain
- Keil Mountain
- Kilburn Mountain
- Lewey Mountain
- Little Moose Mountain
- Little Santanoni Mountain
- Long Pond Mountain
- Lost Pond Peak
- Lyon Mountain
- MacNaughton Mountain
- McKenzie Mountain
- Moose Mountain
- Morgan Mountain
- Mount Adams
- Mount Arab
- Mount Jo
- Moon Mountain
- Noonmark Mountain
- Oven Mountain
- Owls Head Mountain
- North River Mountain
- Pillsbury Mountain
- Pitchoff Mountain
- Poke-O-Moonshine Mountain
- Puffer Mountain
- bjas Mountain
- Round Mountain
- Saint Regis Mountain
- Scarface Mountain
- Sentinel Mountain
- Silver Lake Mountain
- Snowy Mountain
- Stewart Mountain
- Sunrise Mountain
- Titus Mountain
- Tongue Mountain Range
- TR Mountain
- Wakely Mountain
- Wallface Mountain
- Whiteface Mountain
- Wilmington Peak
- Wolf Pond Mountain

== Catskills ==
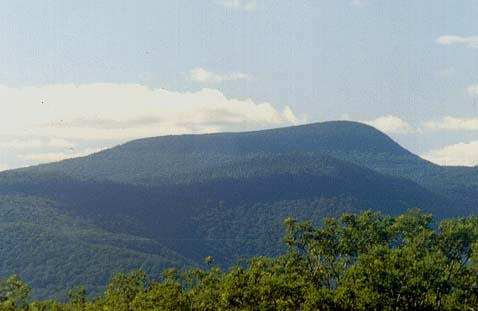
Slide Mountain

The Catskills, which lie northwest of New York City and southwest of Albany, are a mature dissected plateau, an uplift region that was subsequently eroded into sharp relief. They are an eastward continuation of the Allegheny Plateau. They are sometimes considered an extension of the Appalachian Mountains, but are not geologically related.

The highest of the Catskills are listed in the Catskill High Peaks. Other high peaks in the Catskills include:

- Acra Point
- Ashokan High Point
- Barkaboom Mountain
- Baxter Mountain
- Bearpen Mountain
- Bear Spring Mountain
- Beaver Kill Range
- Beech Hill
- Belle Ayr Mountain
- Big Fork Mountain
- Blackhead Range
- Blenheim Mountain
- Boomhower Hill
- Bouchoux Hill
- Bovina Mountain
- Bramley Mountain
- Bullock Hill
- Burnside Hill
- Burnt Knob
- Cave Mountain
- Chamberlain Hill
- Cherry Ridge
- Churchill Mountain
- Clabber Peak
- Clay Hill
- Coe Hill
- Coon Hill
- Couse Hill
- Cowan Mountain
- Cradle Rock Ridge
- Crane Hill (Sidney, Delaware County)]]
- Crane Hill (Walton, Delaware County)
- Denman Mountain
- Devil's Path
- Dingle Hill
- Dry Brook Ridge
- Dunk Hill
- East Gray Hill
- East Wildcat
- East Jewett Range
- Elm Tree Ridge
- Farmers Hill
- Federal Hill
- Ferris Hill
- Fleischmann Mountain
- Franklin Mountain
- Fuller Hill
- Fords Hill
- Gallop Hill
- Garfield Mountain (New York)
- Giant Ledge
- Ginseng Mountain
- Grays Mountain
- Hack Flats
- Halcott Mountain
- Haynes Mountain
- Hawk Mountain
- Heathen Hill
- High Falls Ridge
- Hodge Pond
- Hodges Hill
- Hog Mountain
- Houck Mountain
- Hubbell Hill
- Hunt Hill
- Huntersfield Mountain
- Ice Cave Mountain
- Irish Mountain
- Jackass Hill
- Jackson Hill
- Jehu Mountain
- Jensen Hill
- Johnson Hill
- Jump Hill
- Lawton Hill
- Little Pisgah
- Little Rocky
- Loomis Mountain
- Lumbert Hill
- Maben Hill
- Mary Smith Hill
- McCoys Knob
- McGregor Mountain
- Meeker Hollow
- Michigan Hill
- Middle Mountain
- Millbrook Mountain
- Mill Brook Ridge
- Mohegan Hill
- Mongaup Mountain
- Monka Hill
- Montgomery Hollow
- Moresville Range
- Morris Hill
- Morton Hill
- Mount Jefferson
- Mount Pisgah
- Mount Tremper
- Mount Warren
- North Plattekill
- Narrow Notch
- Negro Hill
- North Mountain
- Northwest Moresville Range
- Old Clump Mountain
- Olderbark Mountain
- Onteora Mountain
- Overlook Mountain
- Packsaddle / Lexington Mountain
- Panther Mountain
- Perch Lake Mountain
- Pine Island Mountain
- Pines Brook Ridge
- Plattekill Mountain
- Point Mountain
- Rattlesnake Hill
- Red Hill (Delaware County)
- Red Hill (Ulster County)
- Red Kill Ridge
- Red Mountain
- Richmond Mountain
- Rock Rift Mountain
- Rose Mountain
- Round Top
- Roundtop (Franklin, Delaware County, New York)
- Roundtop (Roxbury, Delaware County, New York)
- Roundtop Mountain
- Rum Hill
- Sherman Hill
- South Bearpen
- South Mountain
- South Plattekill Mountain
- South Vly
- Southwest Moresville Range
- Sand Pond / Beaver Kill Ridge
- South East Warren
- Shultice Mountain
- Silver Hollow / Edgewood
- Sleeping Lion Mountain / Northeast Halcott
- Speedwell Mountain
- Spruce Mountain
- St Anne's Peak / West Kill
- Stadel Mountain
- Stoppel Point
- Sukkar Mountain
- Taylor Hill
- Tower Mountain
- Twadell Mountain
- Utsayantha Mountain
- Van Loan Hill
- Van Wyck Mountain
- Vandervort Hill
- Waiontha Mountain
- Walnut Mountain
- Walton Mountain
- West Cave
- West Stoppel Point
- West Wildcat Mountain
- Wheat Hill
- White Hill
- White Man Mountain
- Willowemoc / Beaver Kill Ridge
- Winnisook Lake
- Woodhull Mountain (Ulster County, New York)
- Woodpecker Ridge

== Appalachian Mountains ==
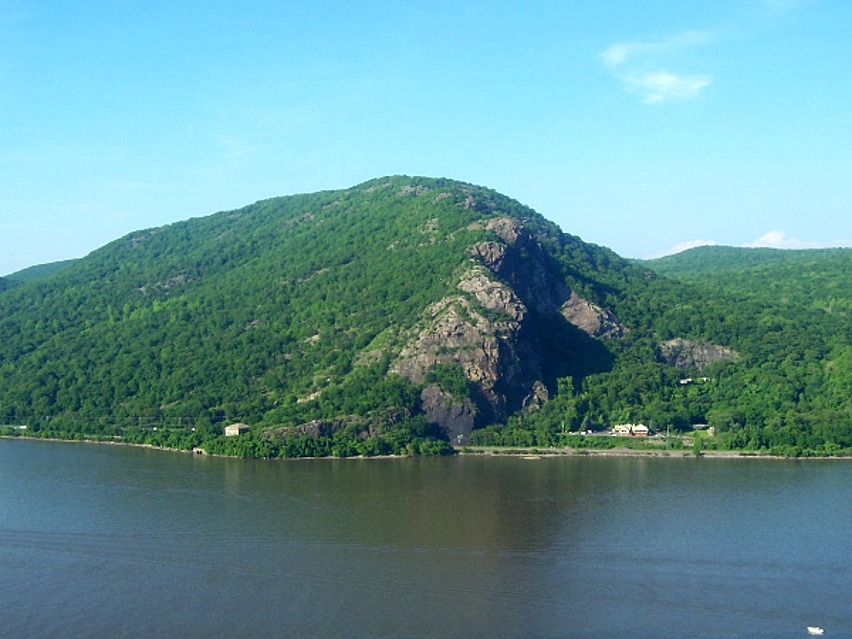
Breakneck Ridge

The mountains of southern New York State are part of the Appalachian Mountains. Ranges include:

- Bellvale Mountain
- Hudson Highlands
  - Anthony's Nose
  - Beacon Mountain
  - Bear Mountain
  - Black Ash Mountain
  - Blackcap Mountain
  - Black Mountain
  - Black Rock Mountain
  - Breakneck Ridge
  - Brooks Mountain
  - Brundige Mountain
  - Bull Hill (Mount Taurus)
  - Chipmunk Mountain
  - Car Pond Mountain
  - Cranberry Mountain
  - Crow's Nest
  - Diamond Mountain
  - Dunderberg Mountain
  - Echo Mountain
  - Fingerboard Mountain
  - Grape Swamp Mountain
  - Green Pond Mountain
  - Halfway Mountain
  - Hasenclever Mountain
  - Hogencamp Mountain
  - Horse Chock Mountain
  - Horse Stable Mountain
  - Irish Mountain
  - Island Pond Mountain
  - Jackie Jones Mountain
  - Knapp Mountain
  - Ladentown Mountain
  - Letterrock Mountain
  - Limekiln Mountain
  - Long Mountain
  - Nordkop Mountain
  - Panther Mountain
  - Parker Cabin Mountain
  - Pine Swamp Mountain
  - Popolopen Torne
  - Pound Swamp Mountain
  - Rockhouse Mountain
  - Squirrel Swamp Mountain
  - Stevens Mountain
  - Stockbridge Mountain
  - Storm King Mountain
  - Sugarloaf Mountain (Dutchess County, New York)
  - Sugarloaf Hill (Putnam County, New York)
  - Tom Jones Mountain
  - West Mountain
- Joppenbergh Mountain
- Marlboro Mountains
- Ramapo Mountains
- Shawangunk Ridge
  - Millbrook Mountain
- Taconic Mountains
  - Alander Mountain
  - Berlin Mountain
  - Brace Mountain
  - Mount Raimer
  - White Rock

== See also ==
- List of mountains of the United States

== Sources ==
Myles, William J., Harriman Trails, A Guide and History, The New York-New Jersey Trail Conference, New York, N.Y., 1999.
