= Bump Mountain =

Mountain in New York, United States

- Location within New York Location within the United States

Highest point
- Elevation: 2,461 feet (750 m)
- Coordinates: 42°20′48″N 74°16′02″W

Geography
- Location: Ashland, New York, U.S.
- Topo map: USGS Ashland

Bump Mountain is a mountain located in the Catskill Mountains of New York northeast of Ashland. Richtmyer Peak is located north-northeast, The Knob is located west, and Ashland Pinnacle is located west-southwest of Bump Mountain.
