= Utsayantha =

Utsayantha may refer to the following locations in the U.S. State of New York:

- Utsayantha Lake
- Utsayantha Mountain
