= List of New York high points by county =

This is a list of the highest elevation in each county in New York, in order from 1 to 62.

New York State highpoints by County
Rank	County	Elevation	Name	Location
1	Essex	5,344 feet (1,629 m)	Mount Marcy	Keene, New York
2	Franklin	4,347 feet (1,325 m)	Seward Mountain	
3	Ulster	c. 4,180 feet (1,270 m)	Slide Mountain	Shandaken, New York
4	Greene	4,040 feet (1,230 m)	Hunter Mountain	Hunter, New York
5	Hamilton	3,899 feet (1,188 m)	Snowy Mountain	
6	Clinton	3,820 feet (1,160 m)	Lyon Mountain	
7	Warren	3,563 feet (1,086 m)	Gore Mountain	
8	Delaware	3,520 feet (1,070 m)	Bearpen Mountain	
9	Schoharie	3,422 feet (1,043 m)	Huntersfield Mountain	
10	Sullivan	3,117 feet (950 m)	Beech Mountain	
11	Rensselaer	2,818 feet (859 m)	Berlin Mountain	
12	Fulton		Pigeon Mountain	
13	Saratoga	2,756 feet (840 m)	Tenant Mountain	
14	Herkimer	2,697 feet (822 m)	Herkimer County High Point	
15	Saint Lawrence	2,688 feet (819 m)	Mount Matumbla	
16	Washington	2,640 feet (800 m)	Black Mountain	
17	Allegany	2,548 feet (777 m)	Alma Hill	
18	Cattaraugus	2,430 feet (740 m)	Clare Benchmark	
19	Otsego	2,421 feet (738 m)	Otsego County High Point	
20	Steuben	2,400 feet (730 m)	Call Hill	
20	Steuben	2,400 feet (730 m)	Jackson Hill	
21	Dutchess	2,323 feet (708 m)	Brace Mountain	North East, New York
22	Ontario	2,280 feet (690 m)	Frost Hill	
23	Livingston	2,244 feet (684 m)	Tabor Benchmark	
24	Chautauqua	2,180 feet (660 m)	Gurnsey Benchmark	
25	Albany	2,162 feet (659 m)	Henry Hill	
26/27	Madison	2,140 feet (650 m)	Morrow Mountain	
26/27	Yates	2,140 feet (650 m)	Yates County High Point	
28	Cortland	2,132 feet (650 m)	Virgil Mountain	
29	Wyoming	2,116 feet (645 m)	Wyoming County High Point	
30	Columbia	2,115 feet (645 m)	Alander Mountain	
31	Lewis	2,110 feet (640 m)	Gomer Hill	
32	Tompkins	2,099 feet (640 m)	Connecticut Hill	
33	Schuyler	2,093 feet (638 m)	Sproul Hill	
34	Broome	2,080 feet (630 m)	Slawson Benchmark	
35	Onondaga	2,060 feet (630 m)	Morgan Hill	
36	Chenango	2,040 feet (620 m)	Chenango County High Point	
37	Tioga	1,994 feet (608 m)	Tioga County High Point	
38	Oneida	1,942 feet (592 m)	Tassel Hill	
39	Erie	1,940 feet (590 m)	Sardinia Benchmark	Niagara Escarpment
40	Chemung	1,914 feet (583 m)	Martin Hill	
41	Cayuga	1,860 feet (570 m)	Cayuga County High Point	
42	Jefferson	1,740 feet (530 m)	Jefferson County High Point	
43	Oswego	1,730 feet (530 m)	Oswego County High Point	
44	Orange	1,664 feet (507 m)	Schunnemunk Mountain	
45	Seneca	1,640 feet (500 m)	Hector Backbone	
46	Montgomery	1,663 feet (507 m)	Willse Hill	
47	Putnam	1,540 feet (470 m)	Scofield Ridge	
48	Genesee	1,470 feet (450 m)	Genesee County High Point	
49	Schenectady	1,456 feet (444 m)	Schenectady County High Point	
50	Rockland	1,278 feet (390 m)	Jackie Jones Mountain	
51	Monroe	1,040 feet (320 m)	Hopper Hills	
52	Westchester	980 feet (300 m)	Bailey Benchmark	
53	Orleans	740 feet (230 m)	Pine Hill	
54	Wayne	701 feet (214 m)	East Johnson Hill	
55	Niagara	675 feet (206 m)	Bunker Hill	
56	Richmond	401 feet (122 m)	Todt Hill	Staten Island
57	Suffolk	400.9 feet (122.2 m)	Jayne's Hill	West Hills, New York
58	Nassau	348 feet (106 m)	Harbor Hill	Roslyn, New York
59	Bronx	280 feet (85 m)	Bronx High Point	Villanova Heights, Fieldston
60	New York	265 feet (81 m)	Bennett Park	Hudson Heights, Manhattan
61	Queens	260 feet (79 m)	North Shore Towers	Glen Oaks, Queens
62	Kings	220 feet (67 m)	Battle Hill	Green-Wood Cemetery
