= Little Delaware River =

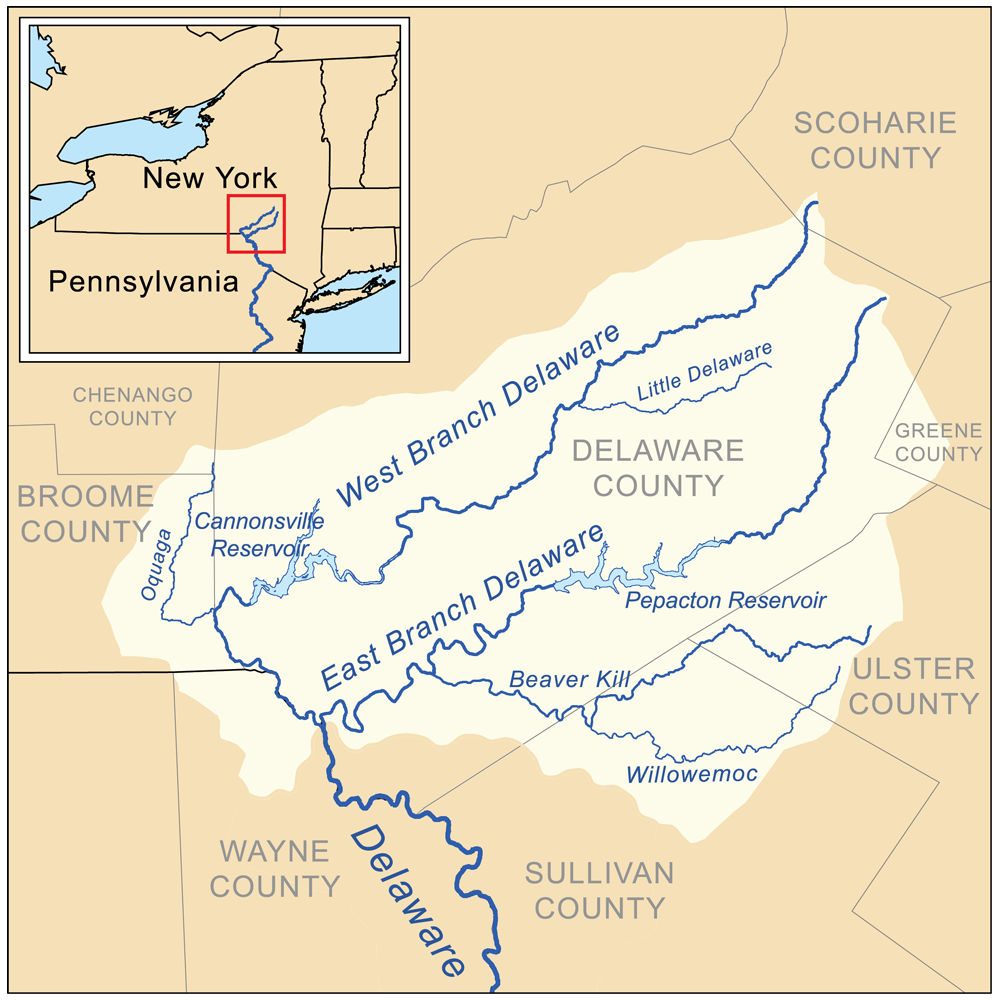
- Little Delaware shown as a tributary of the West Branch Delaware

- Location of the mouth within New York Little Delaware River (the United States)

Location
- Country: United States
- State: New York
- Region: Catskills
- County: Delaware
- Towns: Bovina, Delhi

Physical characteristics
- Source: Unnamed mountain
  - location: NE of Bovina
  - coordinates: 42°17′23″N 74°39′58″W
- Mouth: West Branch Delaware River
  - location: Delhi
  - coordinates: 42°15′35″N 74°55′43″W
  - elevation: 1,325 ft (404 m)
- Length: 16 mi (26 km)
- Basin size: 52.2 sq mi (135 km^{2})
- Discharge
  - location: Delhi
  - minimum: .8 cubic feet per second (0.023 m^{3}/s)
  - maximum: 6,100 cubic feet per second (170 m^{3}/s)

Basin features
- River system: Delaware River
- Tributaries
  - left: Mountain Brook, Coulter Brook
  - right: Brush Brook, Glen Burnie, Hughes Brook, Toll Gate Brook

Little Delaware River is a river in Delaware County, New York. It begins along the western slope of Plattekill Mountain, northeast of the Hamlet of Bovina and flows generally westward before converging with the West Branch Delaware River by the Village of Delhi.

== Fishing ==
In the Little Delaware River the wild brown trout and brook trout populations are supplemented with the stocking of about 700 brown trout yearlings each year. The fish are stocked in a 0.8 miles (1.3 km) zone at the mouth and a 1.2 miles (1.9 km) zone downstream of the hamlet of Bovina Center. Brown trout are the dominant wild trout in the stream, but there are also large amounts of brook trout upstream of Bovina Center.

== Watershed ==
The Little Delaware River's watershed makes up for 7.84% of the West Branch Delaware River's drainage area.

== Hydrology ==
The United States Geological Survey (USGS) maintains one stream gauge along the Little Delaware River.

The station by the Village of Delhi has been in operation since October 1937, but only making maximum measurements since December 1996. It is located on the left bank 10 feet (3.0 m) downstream from the bridge on Thomson Cross Road and 1.5 miles (2.4 km) upstream from the mouth. This station had a maximum discharge of about 6,100 cubic feet per second (170 m^{3}/s) and a gauge height of 8.51 feet (2.59 m) from floodmark on January 19, 1996, and a minimum discharge of .8 cubic feet per second (0.023 m^{3}/s) on August 10–12, 1964 and September 24–25,1964.
