= Grays Mountain =

Mountain in New York, United States

- Location within New York Location within the United States

Highest point
- Elevation: 2,881 feet (878 m)
- Coordinates: 42°10′43″N 74°45′07″W

Geography
- Location: Bovina Center, New York, U.S.
- Topo map: USGS Andes

Grays Mountain is a mountain located in the Catskill Mountains of New York southeast of Bovina Center. Grays Mountain is located south of Mount Pisgah, southwest of Farmers Hill, west-northwest of Fords Hill and north of Dingle Hill.
