= North Settlement Methodist Church =

Historic church in New York, United States

- U.S. National Register of Historic Places
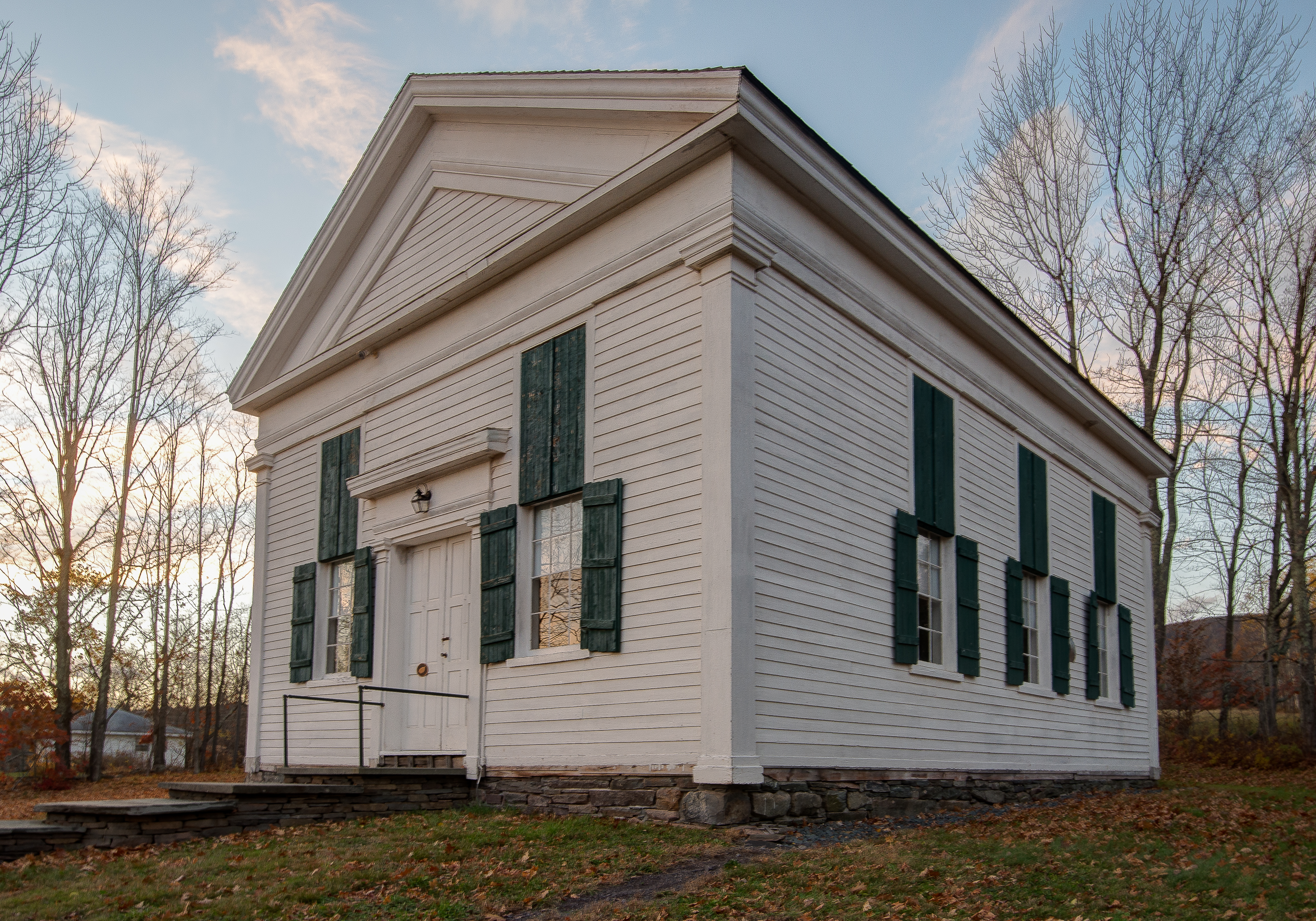

- Location within New York Location within the United States
- Location: Greene County Route 10, east of the junction with County Route 32C, Ashland, New York
- Coordinates: 42°20′16″N 74°17′46″W
- Area: less than one acre
- Built: c. 1826
- Architectural style: Greek Revival, Federal
- NRHP reference No.: 96000561
- Added to NRHP: May 16, 1996

North Settlement Methodist Church is a historic Methodist church on County Route 10, east of the junction with County Route 32C in Ashland, Greene County, New York. It was built about 1826 and is a one-story, four by three bay, post and beam frame church with a modestly pitched gable roof. Also on the property is a small wood frame privy.

It was added to the National Register of Historic Places in 1996.

== See also ==
- West Settlement Methodist Church, also in Ashland and NRHP-listed
- National Register of Historic Places listings in Greene County, New York
