= Mount Warren (disambiguation) =

Mount Warren may refer to one of the following:

== Antarctica ==
- Mount Warren (Antarctica) on Sentinel Range
- Mount Warren (Warren Range) at Warren Range

== Australia ==
- Mount Warren (Queensland)
- Mount Warren Park, Queensland, a suburb in Logan City

== Canada ==
- Mount Warren (Alberta)

== United States ==
- Mount Warren (Arizona)
- Mount Warren (California)
- Mount Warren (Colorado)
- Mount Warren (New York)
- Mount Warren (Wyoming)
