= Silver Lake (Clinton County, New York) =

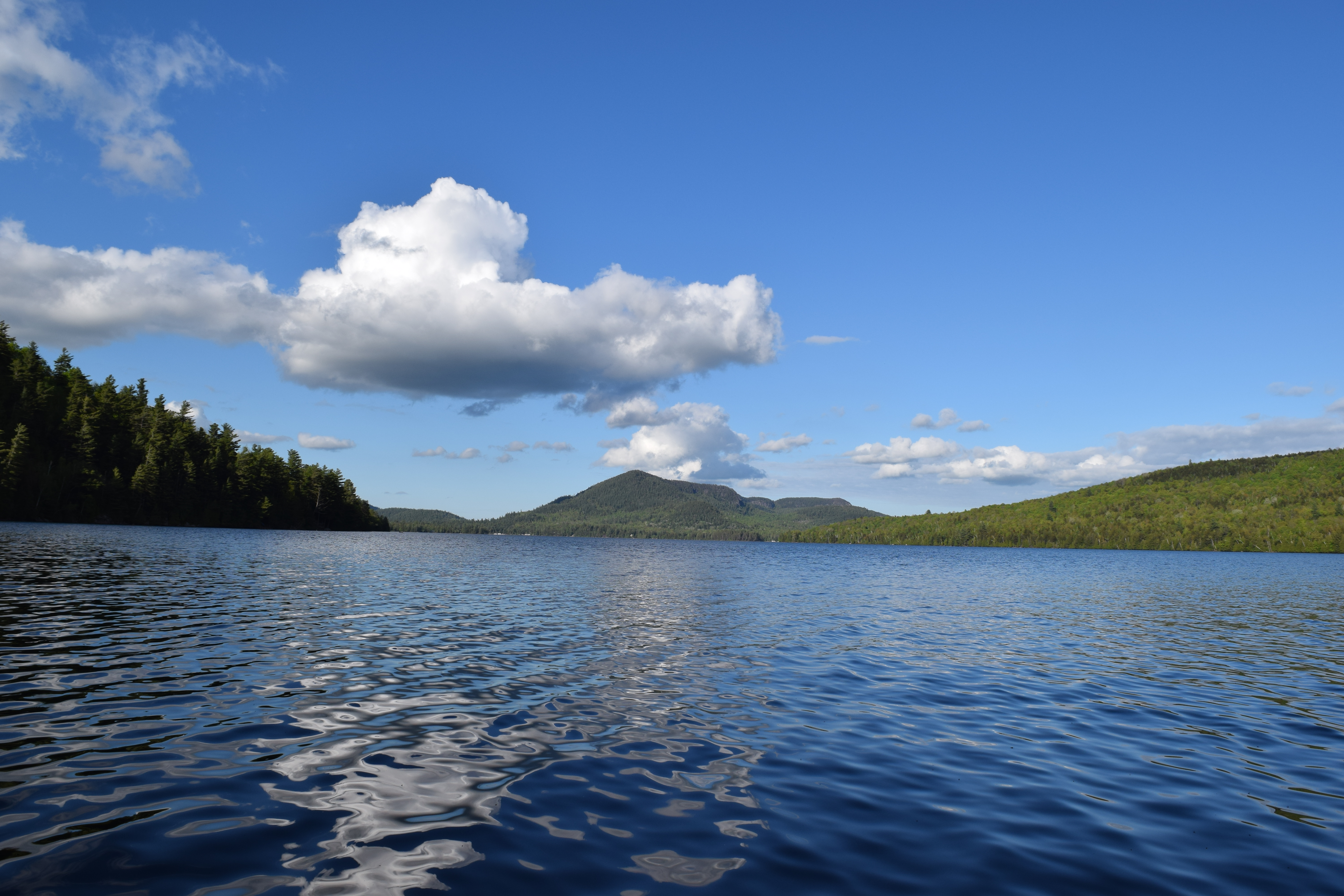

- Location within New York Location within the United States
- Location: Clinton County, New York, United States
- Coordinates: 44.5048°N 73.8810°W
- Type: Lake
- Surface area: 836 acres (338 ha)
- Water volume: 25,613,064 cubic metres (904,516,800 cu ft)
- Shore length^{1}: 11,9 km (7.4 miles)
- Islands: 1
- Settlements: Hawkeye, New York
- ^{1} Shore length is not a well-defined measure.

Silver Lake is a lake located in Clinton County, New York in the Adirondack Park. Silver Lake Mountain and the hamlet of Hawkeye, New York are located on the northeast shores of the lake. The lake was created thousands of years ago, due to the dissolution of glaciers in the Western area of New York. The northern and eastern shores of the lake contain many private camps, while the southern and western shores are forever wild.
