= Red Kill Ridge =

Mountain in New York, United States

- Location within New York Location within the United States

Highest point
- Elevation: 3,012 feet (918 m)
- Coordinates: 42°13′41″N 74°32′32″W

Geography
- Location: Denver, New York, U.S.
- Topo map: USGS Fleischmanns

Red Kill Ridge is a mountain located in the Catskill Mountains of New York northeast of Denver. It is also referred to as Butternut Mountain. It is named after the nearby Red Kill. Cator Roundtop is located northwest, White Man Mountain is located north, and Red Mountain is located north of Red Kill Ridge.
