= The Knob (New York) =

Mountain in New York, United States

- Location within New York Adirondack Park Location within the United States

Highest point
- Elevation: 2,638 feet (804 m)
- Coordinates: 42°20′48″N 74°18′47″W

Geography
- Location: NNE of Ashland, New York, U.S.
- Topo map: USGS Ashland

The Knob is a mountain in Greene County, New York. It is located in the Catskill Mountains north-northeast of Ashland. Ashland Pinnacle is located north, and Huntersfield Mountain is located northwest of The Knob. The mountain has an elevation of 2,638 feet (804 meters).
