= Cator Roundtop =

Mountain in New York, United States

- Location within New York Location within the United States

Highest point
- Elevation: 2,867 feet (874 m)
- Coordinates: 42°15′13″N 74°34′19″W

Geography
- Location: Grand Gorge, New York, U.S.
- Topo map: USGS Roxbury

Cator Roundtop is a mountain located in the Catskill Mountains of New York south-southwest of Grand Gorge. Hack Flats is located northeast, Red Kill Ridge is located southeast, and Red Mountain is located northeast of Cator Roundtop.
