= 4-Cylinder 400 =

2004 short documentary

4-Cylinder 400 is a 2004 short documentary about a barnyard car race in a rural village in upstate New York. Co-directed by John Finn, Harlo Bray and Garret Savage, the film was originally released in 2004 and has been featured on IFC TV Channel, shown in several film festivals around the world, and received critical acclaim from the press. The 23-minute documentary takes place in the small town of Bovina, New York, where residents gather on a family farm for the 5th annual car race in which there are only three rules: no car could cost more than $300, each car must have a 4-cylinder engine, and hitting another racer's driver-side door is prohibited. The film captures the mayhem and the glory of the close-knit community event.

== Soundtrack ==
The soundtrack for 4-Cylinder 400 includes original music from Disciples of Agriculture and Big Barn Burning.
