= Mountain Brook =

Mountain Brook may refer to:

== Places in the United States ==
- Mountain Brook, Alabama, a city in southeastern Jefferson County, Alabama
  - Mountain Brook School System, a public school system in Mountain Brook, Alabama
  - Mountain Brook High School, a three-year public high school within the Mountain Brook School System
- Mountain Brook (New York), a tributary of the Little Delaware River near Bovina, New York

== Livings things ==
- Duellmanohyla, or mountain brook frogs, a genus of frogs in the family Hylidae
- Ichthyomyzon greeleyi, also known as the mountain brook lamprey
