= Grants Hill =

Mountain in New York, United States

- Location within New York Adirondack Park Location within the United States

Highest point
- Elevation: 2,106 feet (642 m)
- Coordinates: 41°50′36″N 74°49′17″W

Geography
- Location: SSE of Livingston Manor, New York, U.S.
- Topo map: USGS Liberty West

Grants Hill is a mountain in Sullivan County, New York. It is located south-southeast of Livingston Manor. Chuck Hill is located southeast and Round Top is located north of Grants Hill.
