= Coulter Brook =

Location
- Country: United States
- State: New York

Physical characteristics
- Source
  - location: Delaware County, New York
- Mouth: Little Delaware River
  - location: Bovina Center, New York, Delaware County, New York, United States
  - coordinates: 42°15′29″N 74°46′19″W
- Basin size: 4.57 mi^{2} (11.8 km^{2})

Coulter Brook flows into the Little Delaware River by Bovina Center, New York.
