= Brush Brook =

River in the United States of America

Location
- Country: United States
- State: New York

Physical characteristics
- Source
  - location: Delaware County, New York
- Mouth: Little Delaware River
  - location: Bovina Center, New York, Delaware County, New York, United States
  - coordinates: 42°15′51″N 74°46′52″W
- Basin size: 5.52 mi^{2} (14.3 km^{2})

Brush Brook flows into the Little Delaware River by Bovina Center, New York.
