= Richmond Mountain =

Mountain in the United States

- Location within New York Location within the United States

Highest point
- Elevation: 3,215 feet (980 m)
- Coordinates: 42°22′03″N 74°16′16″W

Geography
- Location: Hunter, New York, U.S.
- Topo map: USGS Ashland

Richmond Mountain is a mountain located in the Catskill Mountains of New York east-northeast of Hunter. Richtmyer Peak is located northeast, Bump Mountain is located south, Steenburg Mountain is located north, and Ashland Pinnacle is located west-southwest of Richmond Mountain.
