= Schultice Mountain =

Mountain in New York, United States

- Location within New York Location within the United States

Highest point
- Elevation: 3,284 feet (1,001 m)
- Coordinates: 42°19′07″N 74°30′57″W

Geography
- Location: Grand Gorge, New York, U.S.
- Topo map: USGS Roxbury

Schultice Mountain is a mountain located in the Catskill Mountains of New York south-southwest of Grand Gorge. Hack Flats is located south and Irish Mountain is located north of Schultice Mountain.
