= Revonah Hill =

Mountain in New York, United States

- Location within New York Adirondack Park Location within the United States

Highest point
- Elevation: 2,142 feet (653 m)
- Coordinates: 41°49′06″N 74°45′43″W

Geography
- Location: NW of Liberty, New York, U.S.
- Topo map: USGS Liberty West

Revonah Hill is a mountain in Sullivan County, New York. It is located northwest of Liberty. Grants Hill is located northwest and Chuck Hill is located south-southwest of Revonah Hill.
