= West Settlement Methodist Church =

Historic church in New York, United States

- U.S. National Register of Historic Places
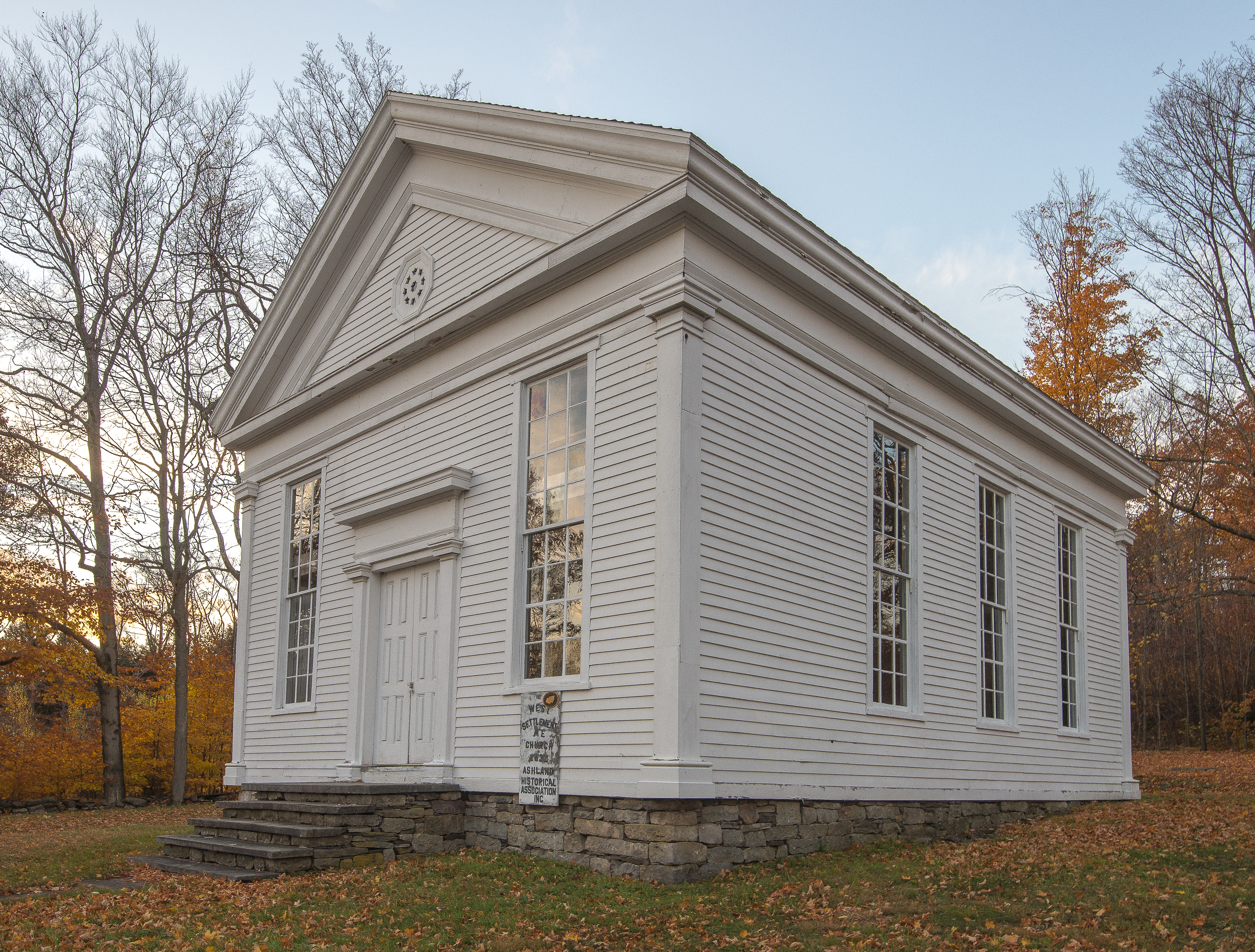

- Location within New York Location within the United States
- Location: West Settlement Rd., jct. with Cleveland Rd., Ashland, New York
- Coordinates: 42°19′57″N 74°22′13″W
- Area: less than one acre
- Built: 1832
- Architectural style: Greek Revival
- NRHP reference No.: 96001435
- Added to NRHP: December 6, 1996

West Settlement Methodist Church is a historic Methodist church on West Settlement Road at the junction with Cleveland Road in Ashland, Greene County, New York. It was built in 1832 and is a one-story, three by four bay, post and beam structure on a limestone block foundation. It features a moderately pitched gable roof and frieze on the gable ends.

It was added to the National Register of Historic Places in 1996.

== See also ==
- North Settlement Methodist Church, also in Ashland and NRHP-listed
