= Meekers Hill =

Mountain in New York, United States

- Location within New York Location within the United States

Highest point
- Elevation: 2,526 feet (770 m)
- Coordinates: 42°08′28″N 74°43′15″W

Geography
- Location: Andes, New York, U.S.
- Topo map: USGS Margaretville

Meekers Hill is a mountain located in the Catskills Mountain Range of New York southeast of Andes. Dingle Hill and Fords Hill are both located northwest of Meekers Hill.
