= Belle Ayr Mountain =

Mountain in New York, United States

- Location within New York Location within the United States

Highest point
- Elevation: 3,373 feet (1,028 m)
- Coordinates: 42°06′57″N 74°29′53″W, 42°07′11″N 74°30′17″W, 42°07′43″N 74°31′09″W

Geography
- Location: Pine Hill, New York, U.S.
- Topo map: USGS Shandaken

Belle Ayr Mountain (or Belleayre Mountain) is a mountain in the Catskill Mountains of New York southwest of Pine Hill. It has a summit elevation of 3,373 feet (1,028 m) bordered by Fleischmann Mountain to the west-northwest, Brush Ridge to the north, with Balsam Mountain and Haynes Mountain to the south. There is a recreational ski area of the same name on the north face of the mountain.
