= Boomhower Hill =

Mountain in New York, United States

- Location within New York Location within the United States

Highest point
- Elevation: 2,484 feet (757 m)
- Coordinates: 42°17′59″N 74°51′17″W

Geography
- Location: Delhi, New York, U.S.
- Topo map: USGS Bloomville

Boomhower Hill is a mountain located in the Catskill Mountains of New York northeast of Delhi. Federal Hill is located southwest and Bramley Mountain is located east of Boomhower Hill.
