= Mountain Brook (New York) =

Location
- Country: United States
- State: New York

Physical characteristics
- Source
  - location: Delaware County, New York
- Mouth: Little Delaware River
  - location: Bovina, New York, Delaware County, New York, United States
  - coordinates: 42°15′53″N 74°43′31″W
- Basin size: 2.34 mi^{2} (6.1 km^{2})

Mountain Brook flows into the Little Delaware River by Bovina, New York.
