= Henry Hill (New York) =

Mountain in Berne, New York

- Location within New York Adirondack Park Location within the United States

Highest point
- Elevation: 2,162 feet (659 m)
- Listing: New York County High Points 25th
- Coordinates: 42°32′58″N 74°11′52″W

Geography
- Location: SE of Huntersland, New York, U.S.
- Topo map: USGS Rensselaerville

Henry Hill is a mountain in the town of Berne in Albany County, New York. It is located southeast of Huntersland. It is directly south of the Partridge Run State Forest. Cook Hill is located northwest and Garver Hill is located west-southwest of Henry Hill. Henry Hill is the tallest point in Albany County and it is ranked 25 of 62 on the list of New York County High Points.
