= Bearpen Mountain =

Mountain in New York, United States

- Location within New York Location within the United States

Highest point
- Elevation: 3,619.6 ft (1,103.3 m)
- Listing: Catskill High Peaks 29th; New York County High Points 8th
- Coordinates: 42°16′24″N 74°29′03″W

Geography
- Location: Lexington / Roxbury, New York, U.S.
- Parent range: Catskill Mountains
- Topo map: USGS Prattsville

Bearpen Mountain is a mountain located in the Catskill Mountains of New York. The mountain's highest peak is in Greene County, but its northwest subpeak at 42°16.42′N 74°29.05′W is the highest point in Delaware County at 3,520 ft. Bearpen Mountain is flanked to the north by Roundtop, and to the southeast by Vly Mountain.

The northeast side of Bearpen Mountain drains into Little West Kill, thence into Schoharie Creek, the Mohawk River, the Hudson River, and into New York Bay. The west side of Bearpen drains into Batavia Kill, thence into the East Branch of the Delaware River, and into Delaware Bay. The south side of Bearpen drains into Vly Creek, thence into Bush Kill, Dry Brook, and the East Branch of the Delaware.

Bearpen Mountain is well known for its trail system with miles of motorized and hiking trails.

The mountain was host to a ski area in the late 1950s and 1960s, originally called Princeton Ski Bowl. Taking advantage of the mountain ridge's northeast exposure and high snowfall, the ski area operated until a land dispute forced its closure. Skiing at Bearpen was an "upside-down" affair, as skiers had to access the summit via a rough auto road. Remains of the lodge and early rope tow ski lifts are still visible in the forest around the mountain top. The mountain is still a popular location for backcountry skiing. From the summit to the valley below skiers can tally around 2100 vertical feet of glades and backcountry trails.

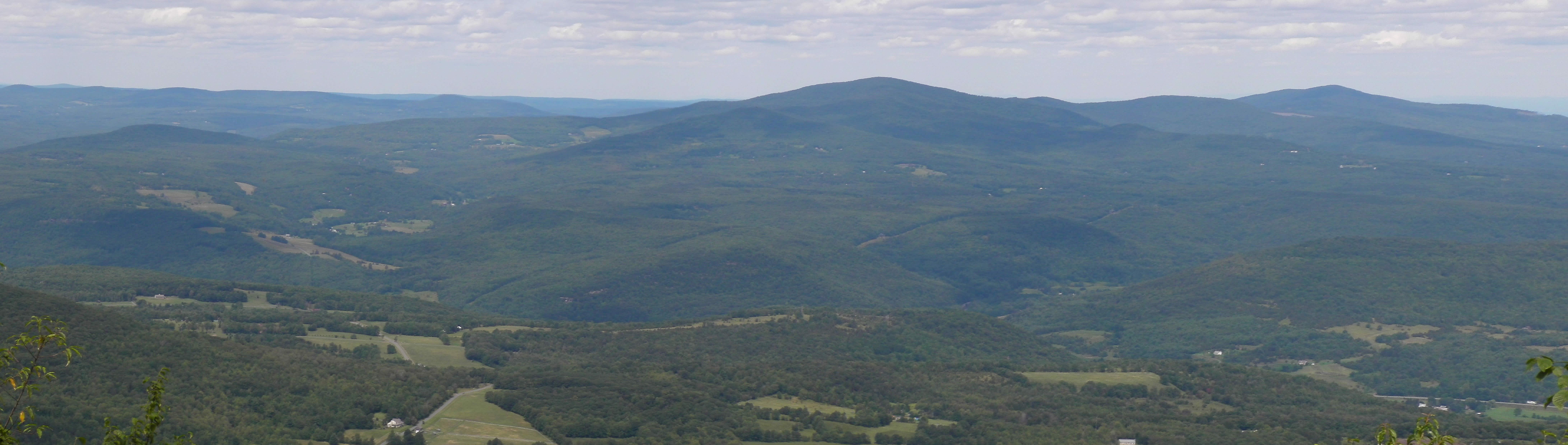
View from the top of Bearpen, facing north, towards the town of Prattsville

A rock cairn was built on the true summit for easier knowing of where the summit is.

== See also ==
- List of mountains in New York
- New York County High Points
