= Lyon Mountain (Delaware County, New York) =

Mountain in New York, United States

- Location within New York Location within the United States

Highest point
- Elevation: 2,926 feet (892 m)
- Coordinates: 42°20′32″N 74°40′15″W

Geography
- Location: Hobart, New York, U.S.
- Topo map: USGS Hobart

Lyon Mountain is a mountain located in the Catskill Mountains of New York south of Hobart. Cowan Mountain is located east of Lyon Mountain and Griffin Hill is located north.
