= Frost Hill =

Mountain in New York, United States

- Location within New York Adirondack Park Location within the United States

Highest point
- Elevation: 2,284 feet (696 m)
- Listing: New York county high points 22nd
- Coordinates: 42°42′40″N 77°26′35″W

Geography
- Location: W of Bristol Springs, Ontario County, New York, U.S.
- Topo map: USGS Bristol Springs

Frost Hill is a mountain in the Finger Lakes Region of New York. It is located west of Bristol Springs in Ontario County. At an elevation of 2,284 feet (696 m), the mountain is the highest point in Ontario County. It is about 1.25 miles (2.01 km) southwest of the 2,150-foot (660 m) Worden Hill, where Bristol Mountain Ski Resort is.
