= Mount Pisgah (New York) =

Mountain in New York, United States

- Location within New York Location within the United States

Highest point
- Elevation: 3,340 feet (1,020 m)
- Coordinates: 42°13′16″N 74°44′09″W

Geography
- Location: Bovina Center, New York, U.S.
- Topo map: USGS Margaretville

Mount Pisgah is a mountain located in the Catskill Mountains of New York southeast of Bovina Center. Grays Mountain, Fords Hill, and Dingle Hill are located south of Mount Pisgah.
