= Carmans Notch =

Wind gap in New York, US

- Location within New York
- Elevation: 2,536 feet (773 m)

Third Approach
- Location: Delaware County, New York
- Range: Catskill Mountains
- Coordinates: 42°18′50″N 74°42′41″W
- Topo map: Hobart

Carmans Notch is a wind gap located west of Mount Warren in the Catskills of New York, south of South Kortright.
