= Hirams Knob =

Mountain in New York, United States

Snake Rocks
- Location within New York Location within the United States

Highest point
- Elevation: 2,884 feet (879 m)
- Coordinates: 42°05′53″N 74°32′31″W

Geography
- Location: Mapledale, New York, U.S.
- Topo map: USGS Seager

Hirams Knob is a mountain located in the Catskill Mountains of New York southeast of Mapledale. Balsam Lake Mountain is located southwest, and Haynes Mountain is located southeast of Hirams Knob.
