= Morrow Mountain (New York) =

Mountain in New York, United States

- Location within New York Adirondack Park Location within the United States

Highest point
- Elevation: 2,142 feet (653 m)
- Listing: New York County High Points 26th
- Coordinates: 42°48′45″N 75°45′03″W

Geography
- Location: Madison County, New York, U.S.

Morrow Mountain is a 2,142-foot (653 m) mountain, and is the highest point in Madison County, New York. A 100-foot (30 m) communication tower occupies the summit. The mountain is the primary geographical feature of Morrow Mountain State Forest, a 1,290-acre (520 ha) state forest in the towns of Georgetown and Nelson. The mountain is the former site of a 67-foot-6-inch-tall (20.57 m) steel fire lookout tower.

== History ==
In 1940, the Civilian Conservation Corps Camp S-103 from DeRuyter built a 67-foot-6-inch-tall (20.57 m) International Derrick steel fire lookout tower on the mountain. Due to increased use of aerial fire detection, the tower ceased fire lookout operations at the end of 1970, and was later removed. Since then, a resident from New Hartford purchased the dismantled tower, and plans to rebuild it at their camp in Oppenheim.
