= Glen Burnie (New York) =

Location
- Country: United States
- State: New York

Physical characteristics
- Source
  - location: Delaware County, New York
- Mouth: Little Delaware River
  - location: Delhi, New York, Delaware County, New York, United States
  - coordinates: 42°15′49″N 74°51′35″W
  - elevation: 1,540 ft (470 m)
- Basin size: 3.41 mi^{2} (8.8 km^{2})

Glen Burnie flows into the Little Delaware River by Delhi, New York.
