= Toll Gate Brook =

Location
- Country: United States
- State: New York

Physical characteristics
- Source
  - location: Delaware County, New York
- Mouth: Little Delaware River
  - location: Delhi, New York, Delaware County, New York, United States
  - coordinates: 42°15′14″N 74°53′21″W
  - elevation: 1,417 ft (432 m)

Toll Gate Brook flows into the Little Delaware River east of Delhi, New York.
