= Churchill Mountain =

Mountain in New York, United States

- Location within New York Location within the United States

Highest point
- Elevation: 3,064 feet (934 m)
- Coordinates: 42°23′19″N 74°36′36″W

Geography
- Location: Stamford, New York, U.S.
- Topo map: USGS Stamford

Churchill Mountain is a mountain located in the Catskill Mountains of New York east-southeast of Stamford. Utsayantha Mountain is located northeast, Cowan Mountain is located southwest, and McGregor Mountain is located east of Churchill Mountain.
