= Hughes Brook (New York) =

Location
- Country: United States
- State: New York

Physical characteristics
- Source
  - location: Delaware County, New York
- Mouth: Little Delaware River
  - location: Delhi, New York, Delaware County, New York, United States
  - coordinates: 42°15′29.7″N 74°52′31.7″W
  - elevation: 1,443 ft (440 m)

Hughes Brook flows into the Little Delaware River east of Delhi, New York, in the eastern part of the country, 400 km northeast of Washington, D.C. Hughes Brook is part of the watershed of the Delaware River at the head of the country.
