= Beaver Kill Range =

Mountain in New York, United States

- Location within New York Location within the United States

Highest point
- Elevation: 3,366 feet (1,026 m)
- Coordinates: 42°00′18″N 74°34′03″W

Geography
- Location: Frost Valley, New York, U.S.
- Topo map: USGS Seager

Beaver Kill Range is a mountain located in the Catskill Mountains of New York west-northwest of Frost Valley. Wildcat Mountain is located east-southeast, Cradle Rock Ridge is located north, and Mongaup Mountain is located west-southwest of Beaver Kill Range.
