= Bovina Mountain =

Mountain in New York, United States

- Location within New York Location within the United States

Highest point
- Elevation: 2,543 feet (775 m)
- Coordinates: 42°19′15″N 74°44′44″W, 42°19′48″N 74°45′12″W

Geography
- Location: Bloomville, New York, U.S.
- Topo map: USGS Hobart

Bovina Mountain is a mountain located in the Catskill Mountains of New York east of Bloomville. Bovina Mountain is located east-northeast of Bramley Mountain and west-northwest of Mount Warren and Carmans Notch.
