= Belleayre Mountain =

Ski area in Highmount, New York, USA

- Interactive map of Belleayre Mountain
- Location: Highmount, New York
- Nearest city: Kingston, New York
- Coordinates: 42°8′31.97″N 74°30′38.8″W
- Status: Operating
- Owner: Olympic Regional Development Authority
- Vertical: 1,404 ft (427.9 m)
- Top elevation: 3,429 ft (1,045.2 m)
- Base elevation: 2,025 ft (617.2 m)
- Skiable area: 171 acres (0.7 km^{2})
- Trails: 62
- Longest run: 12,024 ft (3,664.9 m) Cathedral Brook to Discovery Way.
- Lift system: 4 chairlifts, 1 gondola, 4 carpet lifts
- Lift capacity: 12,980 skiers/hr
- Terrain parks: Yes, 3
- Snowmaking: Yes, 96% of terrain
- Night skiing: No
- Website: https://www.belleayre.com

Belleayre Mountain is a ski resort in Highmount, New York, United States, located on a mountain of the same name within Catskill Park. It is owned by the Olympic Regional Development Authority (ORDA). There are 62 trails served by 4 chairlifts and 1 gondola with a vertical drop of 1,404 ft (427.9 m). Skier and snowboarder visits have grown significantly over the years, with 237,825 visits in the 2022-23 season.

== History ==
In 1855, New York became one of the first states to create constitutionally-designated "Forever Wild" preserves to prevent environmental harm and to create a desperately needed water supply for New York City. A bill allowing the State of New York to create Belleayre Mountain was introduced in 1945, and passed in 1947 for a constitutional amendment by referendum to allow 20 miles of trails to be cut for an intensive use ski center within the protected forever wild region. 618,000 voters supported the creation of a new ski area.

Construction of the $350,000 ski area by the New York State Department of Environmental Conservation (NYS DEC) began in 1949, and Belleayre began its first winter season on January 22, 1950, due to a lack of snow. There were five trails, a rope tow, New York’s first chairlift, and lodge spaces. Belleayre was immediately a popular destination and an economic boon for surrounding communities. The mountain was expanded multiple times over the following years, along with upgrades to lifts and lodges. Snowmaking was introduced in the 1960s.

In 1977, the Roebling double chairlift was replaced by a double chairlift from Hall. The Hall Double was called the Summit Double Chairlift. In 1982, two double chairlifts sharing towers by Doppelmayr were installed to service the lower green terrain, called Lift 1 and Lift 2.

Governor Mario Cuomo suggested closing the ski area due to low revenues in 1984. Many people immediately fought to save the ski area, which was a major employer in the Catskills. The governor later confirmed his suggestion was a mistake, although many locals did not have full confidence with the governor.

In 1986, a Riblet Triple Chairlift with a mid-station was installed to service the top of the mountain from the Overlook and Sunset Lodges. This lift was used for summer sky rides until 2017.

In 1987, the Constitution of New York was amended to allow Belleayre to construct up to 25 miles of trails. As the mountain began to struggle to compete with the consolidation of ski areas in 1994, plans were revealed to expand into the defunct Highmount ski area and for increased development. Many people worried that the loss of the ski area would have a negative economic impact on the region.

In 1999, Garaventa installed two fixed-grip quad chairlifts called Superchief and Tomahawk that served the upper half of the mountain. A new lodge, expanded trails, and upgraded snowmaking was also installed. In 2001, a new parking lot near Tomahawk along with a new trail called Dot Nebel opened on the west side of Belleayre. In 2006, the Superchief fixed grip quad was upgraded to a detachable high-speed quad by Doppelmayr, with many parts used for the Ridge Quad at Catamount Ski Area.

In November 2012, the resort was transferred from the NYS DEC to the Olympic Regional Development Authority (ORDA). The move was intended to increase profits as ORDA already operated Gore Mountain and Whiteface Mountain ski resorts.

$8 million in upgrades were proposed in 2018 by governor Andrew Cuomo. These included a new eight-passenger gondola from the base to summit, as well as lodge renovations. The deer run trail was extended along with a new skier bridge to supplement the new gondola. During the 2019-2020 season, a new fixed-grip quad lift named Lightning replaced Lift 1 and Lift 2.

In the 2023-2024 season, another new fixed-grip quad lift named Overlook Quad replaced lift 7. The new lift follows a near identical path from its predecessor except for an extension of the bottom portion which now directly connects to the Lightning quad. At the same time another skier bridge was constructed over the Overlook parking lot allowing skiers to go directly to the lift without having to go around the Overlook lodge. In addition, the expert trail Utsayantha was removed, replaced by a modified intermediate Goat Path trail. Renovations to the Discovery Lodge continued in 2024 to be completed by the end of that year, expanding rental areas and seating. In October 2024, it was announced that the Discovery Lodge renovations would not be completed due to disputes with the contractor.

== Terrain ==
Belleayre contains multiple trails for Alpine skiing and Cross-country skiing over 171 acres (69 ha) with a vertical drop of 1,404 ft (427.9 m).

=== Alpine ===
The mountain features 62 downhill alpine trails served by 4 chairlifts and 1 gondola. Easier trails are located on the lower half of the mountain and more difficult trails towards the top. Beginners are separated from more advanced skiers and snowboarders by the Overlook lodge. 96% of trails have snowmaking and the longest trail is 12,024 ft (3,664.9 m).

Easier Trails
Chinook
Dakota
Discovery Way
Easy In
Easy Out
Huron
Iroquois
Lower Deer Run
Mohican
Papoose Landing
Running Bear
The Canyon Upper
The Transfer Line
Tee Pee Flats
Thunderhawk Learning Area

More Difficult Trails
Lower Algonquin
Ashokan
Lower Belleayre Run
Cayuga
Deer Run
Lower Dot Nebel
Eagle Falls
Esopus
Expressway
Goat Path
Howe's Highway
Horseshoe Pass
Lower Mohawk
Oneida
Onondaga
Lower Peekamoose
Pepacton
Ridge Trail
Roaring Brook
Route 9
Lower Seneca
The Canyon
The Crossing
Lower Tongora
Lower Wanatuska
Lower Winnisook
Lower Yahoo
Utsayantha

Most Difficult Trails
Algonquin
Belleayre Run
Cathedral Brook
Dot Nebel
Mohawk
Onteora
Peekamoose
Tuscarora
Wanatuska
Winnisook

Expert Trails
Onteora
Seneca
Tongora
Yahoo

=== Glade trails ===
There are 6 glades at Belleayre, they run on natural snow and are most difficult or expert rated.

Name	Rating
Belleayre	
Lower Liftline	
Big T	
Chippewa	
Dreamcatcher	
Upper Liftline	
Winnisook	

=== Freestyle terrain ===
There is 1 terrain park, 1 progression park, and 1 X-course on the mountain.

Name	Type	Trail	Rating
Yahoo	Terrain Park	N/A	
Area 15	Progression Park	The Canyon	
X-course	X-course	Ashokan	

=== Cross country trails ===
Belleayre's cross-country ski trails are separated from the downhill slopes and has its own parking area. There is no fee for these trails and they run 100% on natural snow. Tracks are not regularly set and the trails are not maintained, groomed, or patrolled. Hiking, snowshoeing, and cross-country skiing are permitted on the trails. There are 5 cross-country trails at Belleayre Mountain totaling 9.2 kilometres (5.7 mi).

Name of trail	Rating	Length/Miles	Length/KM
A		1.5	2.4
AA*		0.7	1.0
H*		1.1	1.8
HH*		1.5	2.3
J*		1.5	2.5

== Lifts ==
There are 4 chairlifts and 1 gondola servicing different sections of the mountain providing an uphill lift capacity of 12,980 people per hour.

Name	Type	Year	Make	Vertical	Length	Capacity
Catskill Thunder	8 Passenger Gondola	2017	Doppelmayr	1,339 feet (408 m)	6,391 feet (1,948 m)	2,000
Lightning	Quad Chairlift	2019	Doppelmayr	447 feet (136 m)	3,512 feet (1,070 m)	1,997
Belleayre Express	Detachable Quad	2006	Doppelmayr-CTEC	1,138 feet (347 m)	5,196 feet (1,584 m)	2,400
Overlook Quad	Quad Chairlift	2023	Doppelmayr	896 feet (273 m)	3,412 feet (1,040 m)	2,400
Hawk Quad	Quad Chairlift	1999	Garaventa-CTEC	945 feet (288 m)	3,635 feet (1,108 m)	2,400

== Base areas and lodges ==
There are 3 base areas and 3 lodges at Belleayre.

Name	Elevation
Discovery base area/lodge	2,025 feet (617 m)
Overlook base area/lodge	2,542 feet (775 m)
Tomahawk base area
Sunset Lodge	3,325 feet (1,013 m)
