= Burns Family Farm =

- U.S. National Register of Historic Places
- U.S. Historic district
- Location within New York Location within the United States
- Nearest city: Bovina, New York
- Coordinates: 42°17′59.26″N 74°40′48.2″W
- Area: 195.5 acres (79.1 ha)
- NRHP reference No.: 07000486
- Added to NRHP: May 30, 2007

Burns Family Farm is a historic farm and national historic district located at Bovina in Delaware County, New York. The district contains seven contributing buildings, one contributing site, and one contributing structures. It includes the Burns family farmhouse dating to 1833, 1 1/2-story frame stable (c. 1880), three-level dairy barn (c. 1880), a gable-roofed frame schoolhouse (c. 1880, moved to site in 1956), and smaller outbuildings.

It was listed on the National Register of Historic Places in 2007.

== See also ==
- National Register of Historic Places listings in Delaware County, New York
