= Virgil Mountain =

Mountain in New York, United States

- Location within New York Adirondack Park Location within the United States

Highest point
- Elevation: 2,110 feet (640 m)
- Listing: New York County High Points 28th
- Coordinates: 42°29′35″N 76°08′23″W

Geography
- Location: ESE of Virgil, Cortland County, New York, U.S.
- Topo map: USGS Harford

Virgil Mountain is a mountain in the central part of the state of New York. It is located east-southeast of Virgil in Cortland County. It is the highest point in Cortland County and is ranked 28 of 62 on the list of New York county high points.
