= Little Rocky Mountain =

Mountain in New York, United States

- Location within New York Location within the United States

Highest point
- Elevation: 3,051 feet (930 m)
- Coordinates: 42°06′54″N 74°12′15″W

Geography
- Location: Lanesville, New York, U.S.
- Topo map: USGS Bearsville

Little Rocky Mountain is a mountain located in the Catskill Mountains of New York east-southeast of Lanesville. Plateau Mountain is located north, and Olderbark Mountain is located west of Little Rocky Mountain.
