= Dingle Hill =

Mountain in New York, United States

- Location within New York Location within the United States

Highest point
- Elevation: 2,828 feet (862 m)
- Coordinates: 42°09′45″N 74°44′11″W, 42°09′21″N 74°45′31″W

Geography
- Location: Bovina Center, New York, U.S.
- Topo map: USGS Margaretville

Dingle Hill is a mountain located in the Catskill Mountains of New York southeast of Bovina Center. Dingle Hill is located south of Mount Pisgah, west-northwest of Meekers Hill, and northeast of Perch Lake Mountain.
