= Richtmyer Peak =

Mountain in New York, United States

- Location within New York Adirondack Park Location within the United States

Highest point
- Elevation: 2,986 feet (910 m)
- Coordinates: 42°22′32″N 74°15′49″W

Geography
- Location: SW of West Durham, New York, U.S.
- Topo map: USGS Livingstonville

Richtmyer Peak is a mountain in Greene County, New York and partly in Schoharie County, New York. It is located in the Catskill Mountains southwest of West Durham. Mount Pisgah is located east, and Richmond Mountain is located southwest of Richtmyer Peak.
