= Hog Mountain =

Mountain in New York, United States

- Location within New York Location within the United States

Highest point
- Elevation: 2,608 feet (795 m)
- Coordinates: 42°10′56″N 74°34′19″W

Geography
- Location: Arkville, New York, U.S.
- Topo map: USGS Fleischmanns

Hog Mountain is a mountain located in the Catskill Mountains of New York northeast of Arkville. Fleischmann Mountain is located south and Morris Hill is located southwest of Hog Mountain.
