= Haynes Mountain =

Mountain in New York, United States

- Location within New York Location within the United States

Highest point
- Elevation: 3,425 feet (1,044 m)
- Coordinates: 42°04′45″N 74°30′29″W

Geography
- Location: Pine Hill, New York, U.S.
- Topo map: USGS Seager

Haynes Mountain is a mountain located in the Catskill Mountains of New York south-southwest of Pine Hill. Haynes Mountain is located south of Belle Ayr Mountain, south-southeast of Hirams Knob, and north of Eagle Mountain.
