= Beech Hill (Delaware County, New York) =

Mountain in New York, United States

- Location within New York Location within the United States

Highest point
- Elevation: 2,844 feet (867 m)
- Coordinates: 42°02′44″N 74°47′08″W

Geography
- Location: Downsville, New York, U.S.
- Topo map: USGS Lewbeach

Beech Hill is a mountain located in the Catskill Mountains of New York east-southeast of Downsville. Middle Mountain is located west of Beech Hill.
