= Red Hill (Ulster County, New York) =

Mountain of New York, US

- Location within New York Location within the United States

Highest point
- Elevation: 2,986 feet (910 m)
- Coordinates: 41°55′27″N 74°31′04″W

Geography
- Location: Frost Valley, New York, U.S.
- Topo map: USGS Claryville

Red Hill is a mountain located in the Catskill Mountains of New York east-south of Frost Valley. Woodhull Mountain is located northeast of Red Hill.
