= Moresville Range =

Mountain in New York, United States

- Location within New York Location within the United States

Highest point
- Elevation: 2,969 feet (905 m)
- Coordinates: 42°21′54″N 74°33′13″W, 42°22′38″N 74°33′49″W

Geography
- Location: Grand Gorge, New York, U.S.
- Topo map: USGS Fleischmanns

Moresville Range is a range located in the Catskill Mountains of New York west of Grand Gorge. Irish Mountain is located southeast of Moresville Range and McGregor Mountain is located northwest.
