= Roundtop (Roxbury, Delaware County, New York) =

Mountain in New York, United States

- Location within New York Location within the United States

Highest point
- Elevation: 3,451 feet (1,052 m)
- Coordinates: 42°17′38″N 74°29′26″W

Geography
- Location: Roxbury, New York, U.S.
- Topo map: USGS Prattsville

Roundtop is a mountain located in the Catskill Mountains of New York east-northeast of Roxbury. Hack Flats is located west-southwest, Negro Hill is located north, and Bearpen Mountain is located southeast of Roundtop.
