= Cowan Mountain =

Mountain in New York, United States

- Location within New York Location within the United States

Highest point
- Elevation: 3,068 feet (935 m)
- Coordinates: 42°20′42″N 74°39′00″W

Geography
- Location: Hobart, New York, U.S.
- Topo map: USGS Hobart

Cowan Mountain is a mountain located in the Catskill Mountains of New York southeast of Hobart. Lyon Mountain is located west of Cowan Mountain and Mount Warren is located southwest.
