= Irish Mountain =

Mountain in New York, United States

- Location within New York Location within the United States

Highest point
- Elevation: 3,064 feet (934 m)
- Coordinates: 42°20′08″N 74°31′35″W

Geography
- Location: Grand Gorge, New York, U.S.
- Topo map: USGS Roxbury

Irish Mountain is a mountain located in the Catskill Mountains of New York southwest of Grand Gorge. Irish Mountain is located southeast of Moresville Range and north of Schultice Mountain.
