= Chuck Hill =

Mountain in New York, United States

- Location within New York Adirondack Park Location within the United States

Highest point
- Elevation: 2,011 feet (613 m)
- Coordinates: 41°47′45″N 74°46′31″W

Geography
- Location: WSW of Liberty, New York, U.S.
- Topo map: USGS Liberty West

Chuck Hill is a mountain in Sullivan County, New York. It is located west-southwest of Liberty. Walnut Mountain is located southeast and Revonah Hill is located north-northeast of Chuck Hill.
