= Olderbark Mountain =

Mountain in New York, United States

- Location within New York Location within the United States

Highest point
- Elevation: 3,438 feet (1,048 m)
- Coordinates: 42°06′51″N 74°11′28″W

Geography
- Location: Lanesville, New York, U.S.
- Topo map: USGS Bearsville

Olderbark Mountain is a mountain located in the Catskill Mountains of New York east-southeast of Lanesville. Twin Mountain is located east-northeast, and Little Rocky Mountain is located west of Olderbark Mountain.
