= Mary Smith Hill =

Mountain in New York, United States

- Location within New York Location within the United States

Highest point
- Elevation: 2,776 feet (846 m)
- Coordinates: 42°02′37″N 74°50′02″W

Geography
- Location: Downsville, New York, U.S.
- Topo map: USGS Lewbeach

Mary Smith Hill is a mountain located in the Catskill Mountains of New York east-southeast of Downsville. Middle Mountain is located east of Mary Smith Hill.
