= Gomer Hill =

Mountain in New York, United States

- Location within New York Adirondack Park Location within the United States

Highest point
- Elevation: 2,106 feet (642 m)
- Coordinates: 43°39′03″N 75°29′09″W

Geography
- Location: WNW of Turin, Lewis County, New York, U.S.
- Topo map: USGS Glenfield

Gomer Hill is a 2,106-foot-tall (642 m) mountain in the Tug Hill region of New York. It is located west-northwest of Turin in Lewis County. In 1940, a 67-foot-6-inch-tall (20.57 m) steel fire lookout tower was built on the mountain. The tower ceased fire lookout operations at the end of the 1988 season, and officially closed the next year. The tower site is open to the public, but the tower is closed and used as an antenna support structure.

== History ==
In 1940, the Civilian Conservation Corps Camp S-122 of Boonville built a 67-foot-6-inch-tall (20.57 m) International Derrick steel fire lookout tower. The tower was first staffed in 1941, and reported 2 fires and 161 visitors. Due to increased use of aerial fire detection, the tower ceased fire lookout operations at the end of the 1988 season, and officially closed the next year. The tower site is open to the public, but the tower is closed and used as an antenna support structure. The cabin was moved to the Lowville Demonstration Forest where it is used as a forest fire control exhibit along with the upper portion from the Number Four Fire Tower.
