= Ashland Pinnacle =

Mountain in New York, United States

- Location within New York Adirondack Park Location within the United States

Highest point
- Elevation: 3,038 feet (926 m)
- Coordinates: 42°21′24″N 74°18′47″W

Geography
- Location: NNE of Ashland, New York, U.S.
- Topo map: USGS Ashland

Ashland Pinnacle is a pillar in Greene County, New York. It is located in the Catskill Mountains north-northeast of Ashland. The Knob is located south, and Huntersfield Mountain is located west of Ashland Pinnacle.
