= Rose Mountain (New York) =

Mountain in New York, United States

- Location within New York Location within the United States

Highest point
- Elevation: 3,091 feet (942 m)
- Coordinates: 42°09′02″N 74°26′17″W, 42°02′57″N 74°37′06″W

Geography
- Location: Pine Hill, New York, U.S.
- Topo map: USGS West Kill

Rose Mountain is a mountain located in the Catskill Mountains of New York northeast of Pine Hill. Monka Hill is located west of Rose Mountain and Halcott Mountain is located north.
