= Twadell Mountain =

Mountain in New York, United States

- Location within New York Location within the United States

Highest point
- Elevation: 2,293 feet (699 m)
- Coordinates: 42°00′11″N 75°07′02″W

Geography
- Location: NNE of East Branch, Delaware County, New York, U.S.
- Topo map: USGS Corbett

Twadell Mountain is a 2,293-foot-high (699 m) mountain in the Catskill Mountains of New York. It is located north-northeast of East Branch in Delaware County. Rock Rift Mountain is located north-northwest, and Baxter Mountain is located east of Twadell Mountain. In May 1910, a 45-foot-tall (14 m) modified windmill tower was built on the mountain for fire lookout purposes. In 1919, the windmill tower was replaced with a 47-foot-tall (14 m) steel lookout tower. The tower ceased fire lookout operations at the end of the 1972 fire lookout season. The tower still remains but is closed to the public.

== History ==
In May 1910, a 45-foot-tall (14 m) modified windmill tower was built on the mountain. It was purchased for $307.70 (equivalent to $10,632 in 2025) and built by the Forest, Fish and Game Commission. By 1916, a cabin had been erected on the mountain for the fire observer, which was smaller than the standard design developed by the state in the early 1920s. In 1919, the windmill was replaced with a 47-foot-tall (14 m) Aermotor LS40 steel tower. The tower ceased fire lookout operations at the end of the 1972 fire lookout season and was then sold to the landowner. The tower still remains, but is on private land and therefore closed to the public.
