= Scarface Mountain (New York) =

Mountain in New York, United States

- Location within New York

Highest point
- Elevation: 3,058 ft (932 m)
- Prominence: 1,021 ft (311 m)
- Isolation: 5.03 mi (8.10 km)
- Coordinates: 44°15′54″N 74°4′27″W

Geography
- Location: North Elba, Essex County; New York, United States
- Parent range: Adirondack Mountains

Scarface Mountain is a mountain summit located in the Adirondack Mountains, in the U.S. state of New York. It is located in the town of North Elba.
