= Mongaup Mountain =

Mountain in New York, United States

- Location within New York Location within the United States

Highest point
- Elevation: 2,762 feet (842 m)
- Coordinates: 41°59′27″N 74°41′03″W

Geography
- Location: Frost Valley, New York, U.S.
- Topo map: USGS Willowemoc

Mongaup Mountain is a mountain located in the Catskill Mountains of New York west of Frost Valley. Cradle Rock Ridge is located north, and Beaver Kill Range is located east-northeast of Mongaup Mountain.
