= McGregor Mountain =

Mountain in New York, United States

- Location within New York Location within the United States

Highest point
- Elevation: 3,192 feet (973 m)
- Coordinates: 42°23′24″N 74°34′45″W

Geography
- Location: Stamford, New York, U.S.
- Topo map: USGS Stamford

McGregor Mountain is a mountain located in the Catskill Mountains of New York south of Stamford. Utsayantha Mountain is located northwest of McGregor Mountain, Moresville Range is located southeast and Churchill Mountain is located west.
