= Crane Mountain (New York) =

Mountain in New York, United States

- Location within New York Adirondack Park Location within the United States

Highest point
- Elevation: 3,251 feet (991 m)
- Coordinates: 43°32′41″N 73°57′44″W

Geography
- Location: NW of Warrensburg, Warren County, New York, U.S.
- Topo map: USGS Johnsburg

Crane Mountain is a 3,251-foot-tall (991 m) mountain in the Adirondack Mountains of New York. It is located northwest of Warrensburg in Warren County. The mountain is the former site of a 35-foot-tall (11 m) steel fire lookout tower. The tower was installed in 1918, and later removed in 1987.

== History ==
In September 1911, the Conservation Commission built a wood fire lookout tower on the mountain. In 1918, the Conservation Commission bought a 35-foot-tall (11 m) Aermotor LS40 steel fire lookout tower, and installed it on the mountain the next year. Due to increased use of aerial detection which was better, the tower ceased fire lookout operations at the end of the 1970 fire lookout season. The tower was deemed surplus in 1984, and later removed in 1987.
