= Ohmer Mountain =

Mountain in New York State

- Location within New York Adirondack Park Location within the United States

Highest point
- Elevation: 2,572 feet (784 m)
- Coordinates: 43°20′11″N 74°03′03″W

Geography
- Location: NE of Northville in Saratoga County, New York, U.S.
- Topo map: USGS Ohmer Mountain

Ohmer Mountain is a 2,572-foot-tall (784 m) mountain in the Adirondack Mountains of New York. It is located northeast of Northville in Saratoga County.

== History ==
In October 1911, the Conservation Commission built a wood fire lookout tower on the mountain. The tower ceased fire lookout operations in 1916, as arrangements couldn't be made to continue to maintain it. In 1917, a steel fire lookout tower was constructed on Hadley Mountain to replace the wood tower on Ohmer Mountain.
