= Sproul Hill =

Mountain in New York, United States

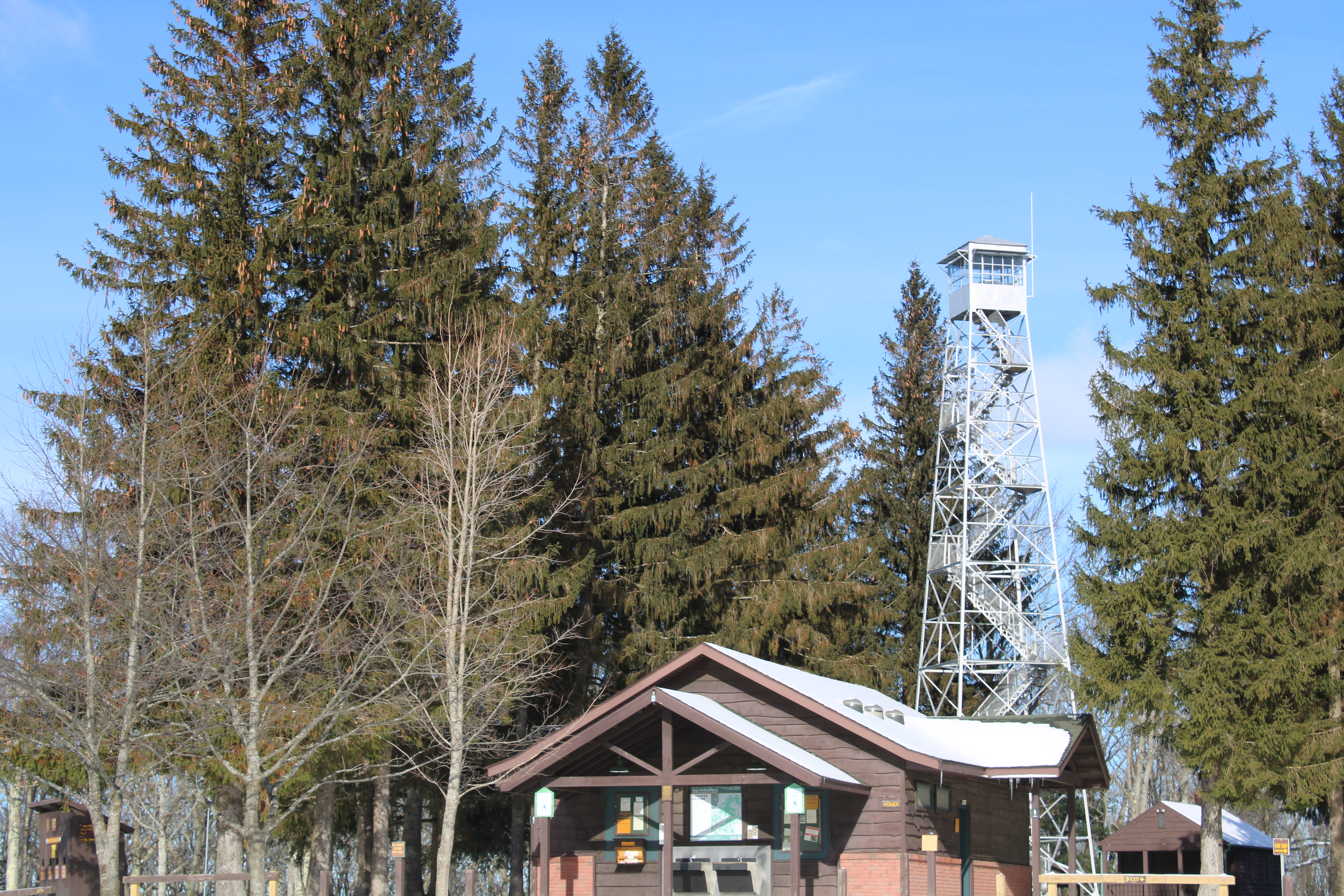
- Sugar Hill Fire Tower on Sproul Hill

Highest point
- Elevation: 2,093 feet (638 m)
- Coordinates: 42°23′13″N 77°00′09″W

Geography
- Location within New York Adirondack Park Location within the United States
- Location: W of Watkins Glen, Schuyler County, New York, U.S.
- Topo map: USGS Wayne

Sproul Hill is a mountain in the Finger Lakes region of New York. It is located in west of Watkins Glen in Schuyler County. The mountain is the location of a 67-foot-6-inch-tall (20.57 m) steel fire lookout tower known as the Sugar Hill Fire Tower which was built in 1941. The tower ceased fire lookout operations at the end of 1988, and remains on the mountain and is open to the public.

== History ==
In 1940, a fire lookout tower was planned to be built near Prattsburgh. The district forest ranger wanted a tower to be built instead on Sproul Hill to see the next tower to insersect fires in the Corning-Painted Post area. In 1941, the Civilian Conservation Corps built a 67-foot-6-inch-tall (20.57 m) International Derrick steel fire lookout tower on the mountain. The tower, like many in the Southern Tier wasn't intended to be part of the system of towers in the Adirondack Mountains or Catskill Mountains, but to protect large areas of State Forest lands. The tower is 2.5 metres (0.0025 km) north-northwest of Sugar Hill but is known as the Sugar Hill Fire Tower due to the name of the reforestation area its in. Due to increased use of aerial detection, the tower ceased fire lookout operations at the end of the 1988 season and was officially closed in early 1989. The tower remains on the mountain and is open to the public.
