= Monka Hill =

Mountain in New York, United States

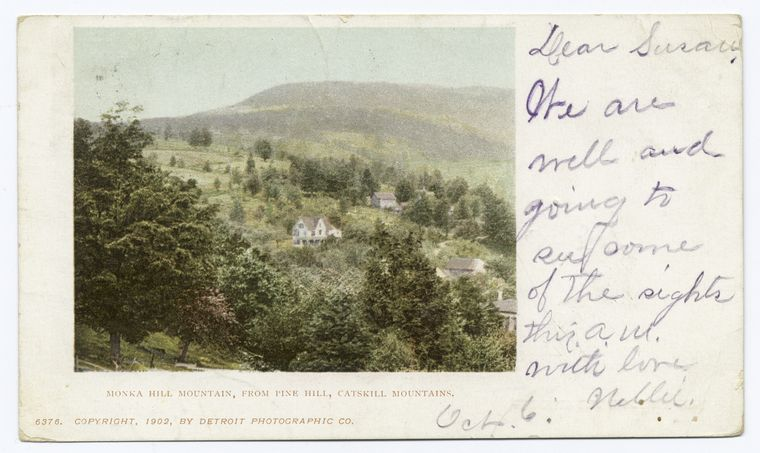
- An old postcard

Highest point
- Elevation: 2,484 feet (757 m)
- Coordinates: 42°09′25″N 74°29′12″W

Geography
- Location within New York Location within the United States
- Location: Pine Hill, New York, U.S.
- Topo map: USGS West Kill

Monka Hill is a mountain located in the Catskill Mountains of New York north-northwest of Pine Hill. Monka Hill is located east of Rose Mountain.
