= Woodhull Mountain (Ulster County, New York) =

Mountain in New York, United States

- Location within New York Location within the United States

Highest point
- Elevation: 3,054 feet (931 m)
- Coordinates: 41°56′45″N 74°27′50″W

Geography
- Location: Frost Valley, New York, U.S.
- Topo map: USGS Peekamoose Mountain

Woodhull Mountain is a mountain located in the Catskill Mountains of New York east-southeast of Frost Valley. Van Wyck Mountain is located east-northeast and Red Hill is located west-southwest of Woodhull Mountain.

Woodhull Mountain is in the Summits category for Ulster County in the state of New York. Woodhull Mountain is displayed on the Peekamoose Mountain USGS quad topo map. The latitude and longitude coordinates of Woodhull Mountain are 41.9459259, -74.4637647 and the approximate elevation is 3,054 feet (931 meters) above sea level.
