= Negro Hill (Delaware County, New York) =

Mountain in New York, United States

- Location within New York Location within the United States

Highest point
- Elevation: 1,939 feet (591 m)
- Coordinates: 42°19′41″N 74°28′10″W

Geography
- Location: Roxbury, New York, U.S.
- Topo map: USGS Prattsville

Negro Hill is a mountain located in the Catskill Mountains of New York northeast of Roxbury. Roundtop is located south-southwest, Clay Hill is located east and Ferris Hill is located northwest of Negro Hill.

== Toponymy ==
The hill was originally named Nigger Hill but was renamed Negro Hill in 1963, similar to hundreds of other places in the United States. Like many of these places named by white Americans with a racial slur, the name was originally given because slaves, freed slaves, or free African-American people lived there.
