= Millbrook Mountain =

Mountain in New York, United States

- Location within New York Location within the United States

Highest point
- Elevation: 1,614 feet (492 m)
- Coordinates: 41°42′30″N 74°13′34″W

Geography
- Location: Ulster County, New York, U.S.
- Topo map: USGS Gardiner

Climbing
- Easiest route: Hike

Millbrook Mountain is a mountain located in the Shawangunk Ridge of New York northwest of Benton Corners. Millbrook Ridge is named after the nearby Mill Brook. Mount Meenahga is located west-southwest of Millbrook Mountain. The mountain can be approached from either the Mohonk Preserve or Minnewaska State Park Reserve.

== Gallery ==
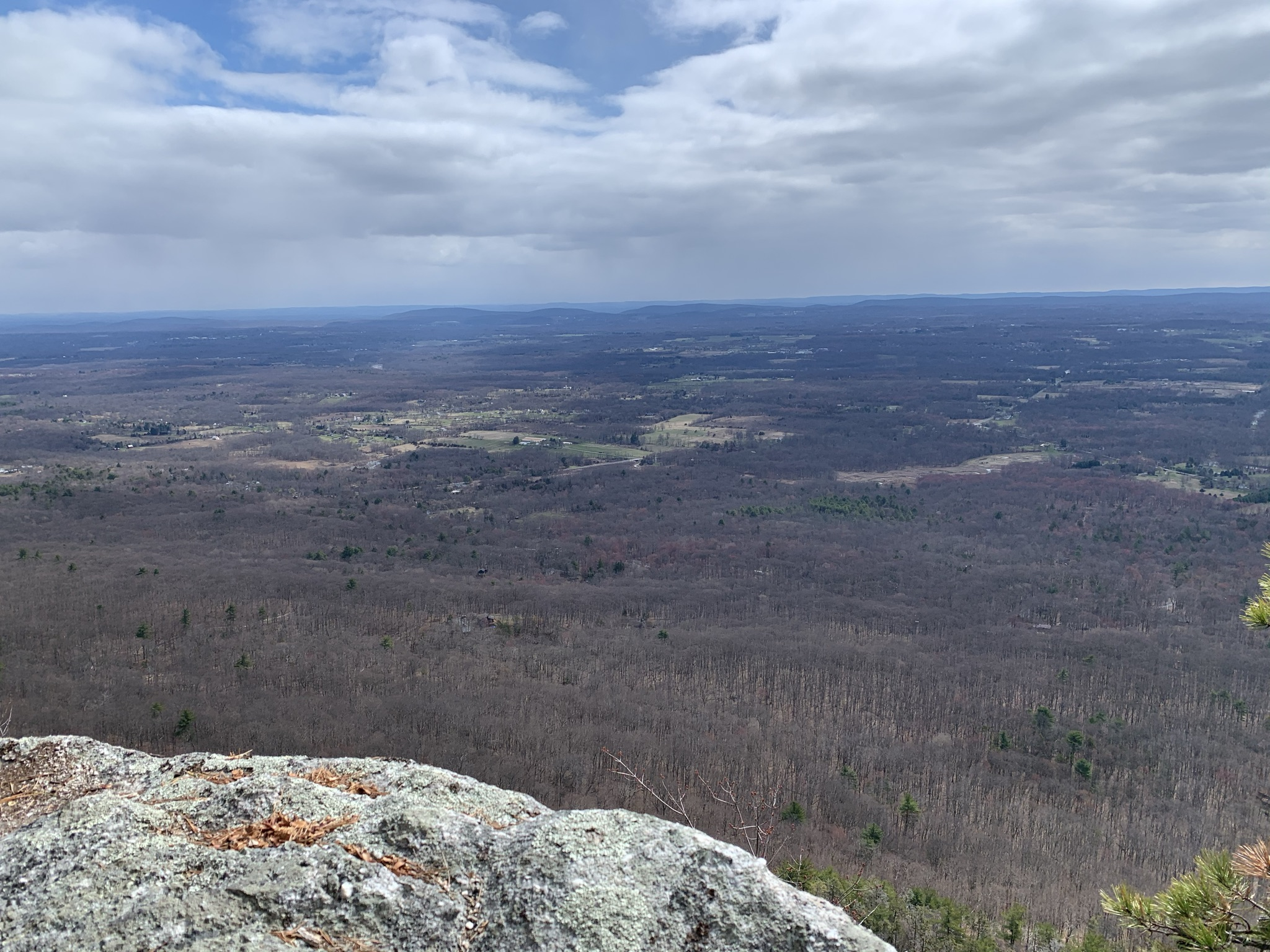
View from the summit

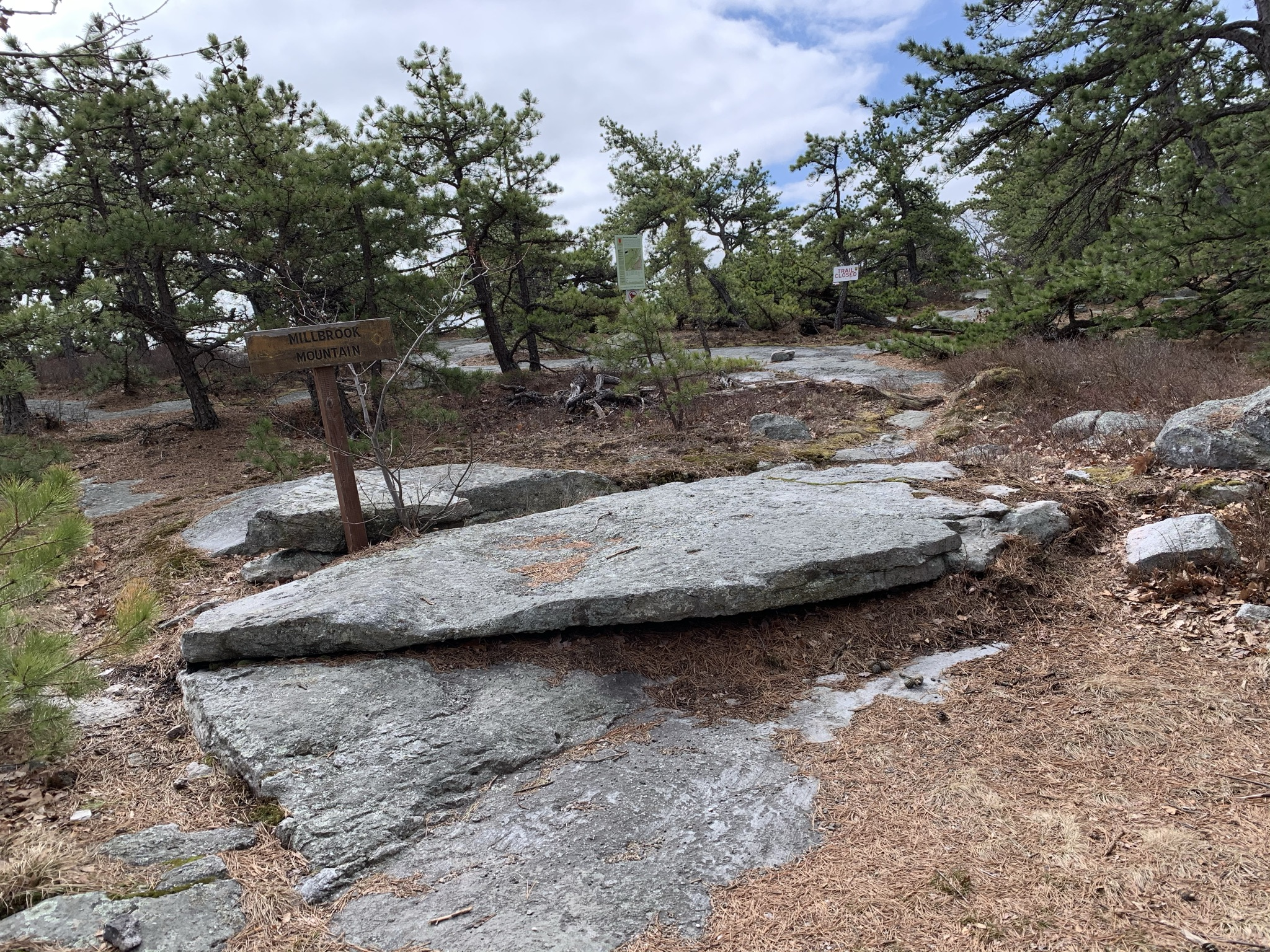
Sign near the summit
