= Fingerboard Mountain =

Mountain in New York, United States

- Location within New York Location within the United States

Highest point
- Elevation: 1,375 ft (419 m)
- Coordinates: 41°15′54″N 74°06′15″W

Geography
- Location: SE of Central Valley, New York, U.S.
- Topo map: USGS Popolopen Lake

Fingerboard Mountain is a mountain located southeast of the hamlet of Central Valley in Orange County, New York.

== History ==
In 1928, a 60-foot-tall (18 m) Aermotor LS40 tower was built on the mountain by the Palisades State Park Commission on Harriman State Park. The tower was one of three such towers erected that same year. The others being on Bear Mountain and Jackie Jones Mountain. With the completion of the towers the Park Commission felt that an adequate system of fire detection had been attained for the park. The tower ceased fire lookout operations in the early 1970's, when it was closed and removed.
