= Middle Mountain (Delaware County, New York) =

Mountain in New York, United States

- Location within New York Location within the United States

Highest point
- Elevation: 2,972 feet (906 m)
- Coordinates: 42°02′25″N 74°47′44″W

Geography
- Location: Downsville, New York, U.S.
- Topo map: USGS Lewbeach

Middle Mountain is a mountain located in the Catskill Mountains of New York east-southeast of Downsville. Mary Smith Hill is located west of Middle Mountain and Beech Hill is located east.
