= Walnut Mountain =

Mountain in New York, United States

- Location within New York Adirondack Park Location within the United States

Highest point
- Elevation: 2,080 feet (630 m)
- Coordinates: 41°47′14″N 74°46′07″W

Geography
- Location: SW of Liberty, New York, U.S.
- Topo map: USGS Liberty West

Walnut Mountain is a mountain in Sullivan County, New York. It is located southwest of Liberty. Columbia Hill is located southeast and Chuck Hill is located northwest of Walnut Mountain.
