= Chapin Hill =

Mountain in New York, United States

- Location within New York Adirondack Park Location within the United States

Highest point
- Elevation: 1,427 feet (435 m)
- Coordinates: 41°36′05″N 74°50′15″W

Geography
- Location: SW of Monticello, Sullivan County, New York, U.S.
- Topo map: USGS Highland Lake

Chapin Hill is a 1,427-foot-tall (435 m) mountain in the state of New York. It is located southwest of Monticello in Sullivan County. In 1924, a 60-foot-tall (18 m) steel fire lookout tower was built on the mountain. Due to increased use of aerial fire detection, the tower closed at the end of the 1970 fire season, and was later removed.

== History ==
In 1924, a 60-foot-tall (18 m) Aermotor LS40 steel tower was built on the mountain. The tower was built with money appropriated by the Sullivan County Board of Supervisors. In 1941, a fire destroyed the observer's cabin and also burned the first three landings and stairs on the tower. Due to increased use of aerial fire detection, which was better, the tower was closed at the end of the 1970 fire season, and was later removed.
