= Spruce Mountain (New York) =

Mountain in New York, United States

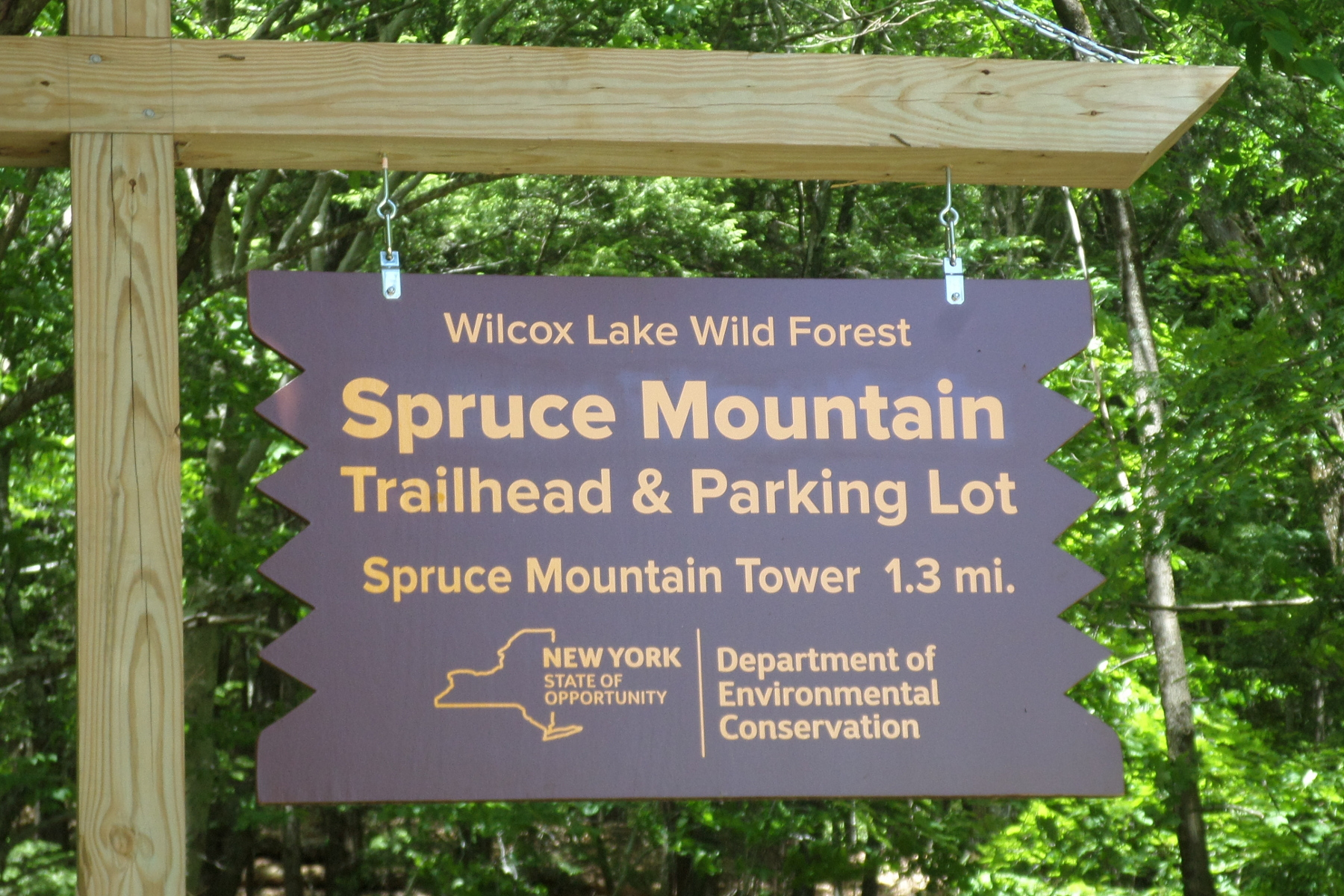
- Trailhead off Spruce Mountain Road, Corinth NY

Highest point
- Elevation: 2,005 ft (611 m)
- Coordinates: 43.2164616°N 73.9056800°W

Geography
- Location within New York Adirondack Park Location within the United States
- Location: Saratoga County, New York, U.S.
- Parent range: Kayaderosseras Range
- Topo map(s): USGS Porter Corners, New York

Spruce Mountain is a mountain in the Kayaderosseras Range in the town of Corinth in Saratoga County, New York. The 2,005 foot (611 m) summit is accessible via a 1.3-mile (2.1 km) trail and is topped with a 73 foot (22 m) fire tower affording a more than 120-mile (190 km) panoramic view from the Adirondacks to the Catskills, and east to Vermont. The tower, built in 1928 and refurbished in 2015, is one of only 23 remaining in the Adirondack Mountains.

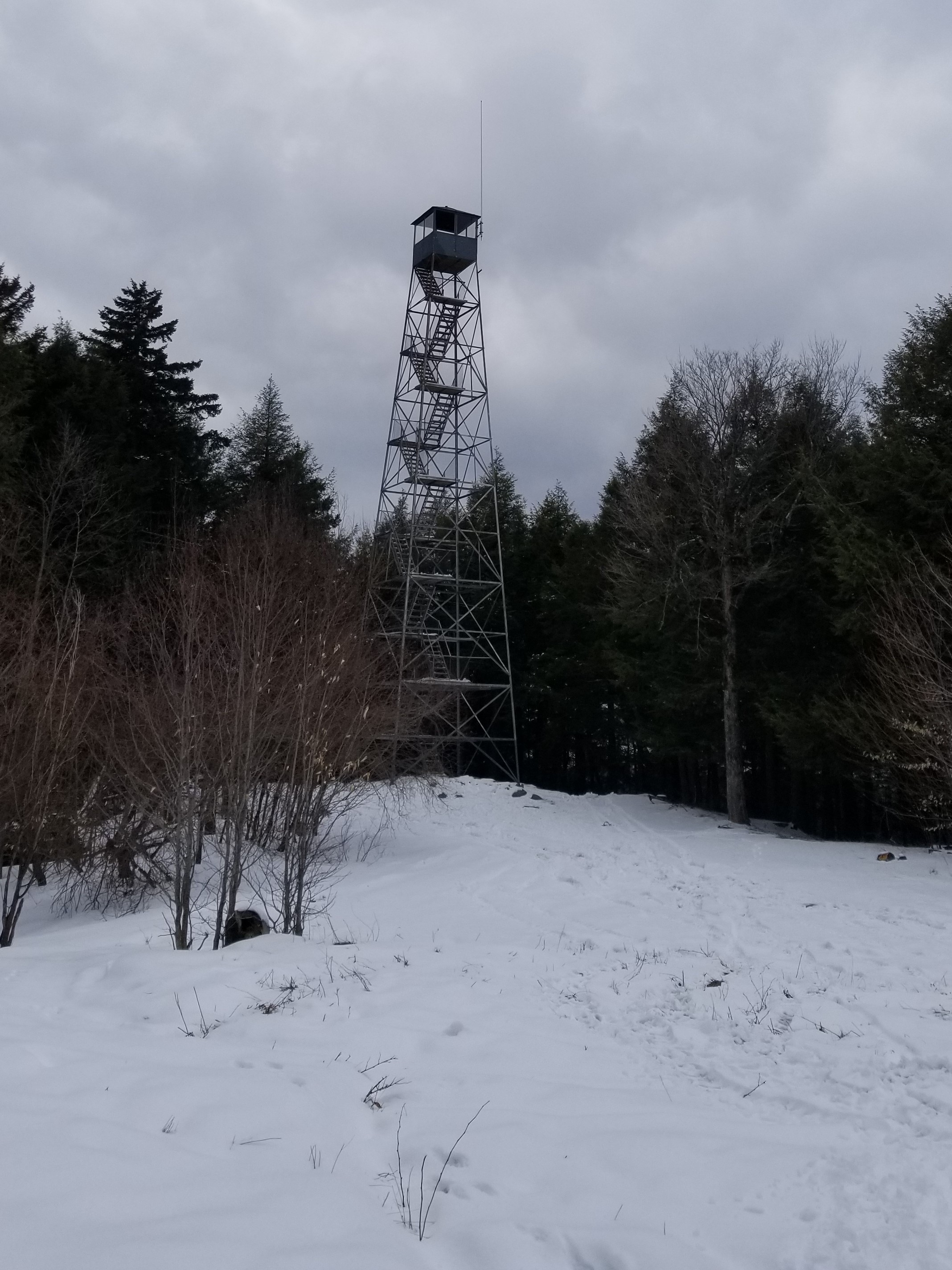
The Spruce Mountain fire tower as seen in April 2018
