= Utsayantha Mountain =

Mountain in New York, United States

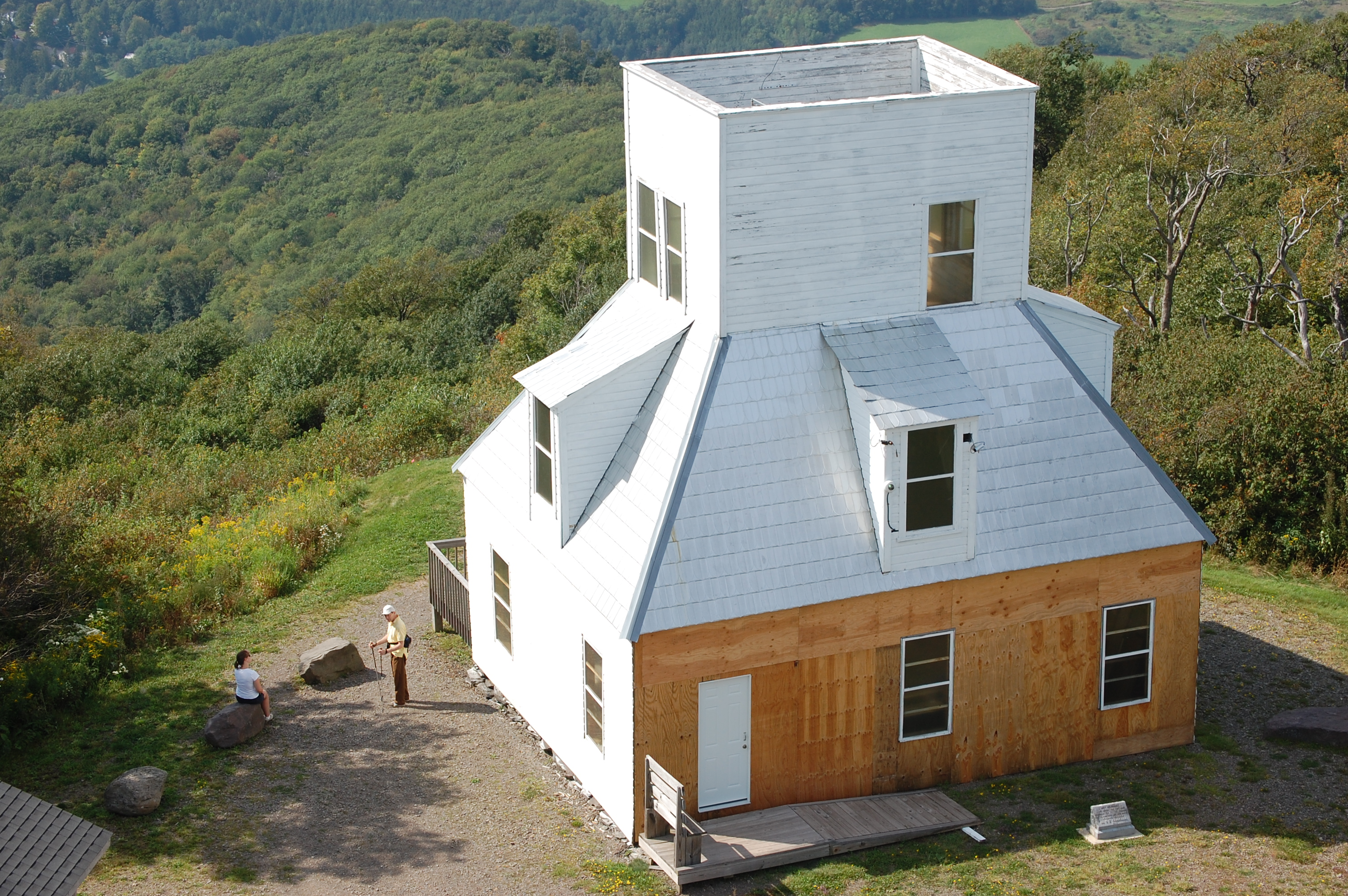
- Utsayantha Mountain Observation Station

Highest point
- Elevation: 3,209 feet (978 m)
- Prominence: 534 ft (163 m)
- Listing: Catskill Top 102 #62
- Coordinates: 42°23′57″N 74°35′23″W

Geography
- Location within New York Location within the United States
- Location: ESE of Stamford, Delaware County, New York, U.S.
- Parent range: Catskill Mountains
- Topo map: USGS Stamford

Utsayantha Mountain is a 3,209-foot-tall (978 m) mountain in the Catskill Mountains of New York. It is located east-southeast of Stamford in Delaware County. Variant names include Utsayanthe Mountain, Utsayanthia Mountain, Utsayantho Mountain, and Utsyantha Mountain. McGregor Mountain is located southeast of Utsayantha Mountain and Churchill Mountain is located southwest. Utsayantha Mountain is named after Utsayantha, the daughter of Chief Ubiwacha, chief of the Lenape Indians.

In 1934, a 59-foot-3-inch-tall (18.06 m) steel fire lookout tower was built on the peak. The tower was ceased fire lookout operations at the end of the 1989 fire lookout season. In July 2005, restoration work that began in 2004 was completed. The tower is on the National Historic Lookout Register and is open to the public.

== History ==
Utsayantha Mountain is named after Utsayantha, the daughter of Chief Ubiwacha. Chief Ubiwacha was the chief of the Lenape Indians. Utsayantha had a baby fathered by a non-tribal settler. The chief being furious killed the settler by driving a hatchet in his skull. The chief then threw the new born into the lake. Utsayantha drowned herself in the same lake Utsayantha Lake after seeing her son thrown in. In 1862 a grave was discovered on the mountain, that was believed to be the grave of Utsayantha. The identity of the person in the grave still remains unproven to this day.

=== Fire tower ===
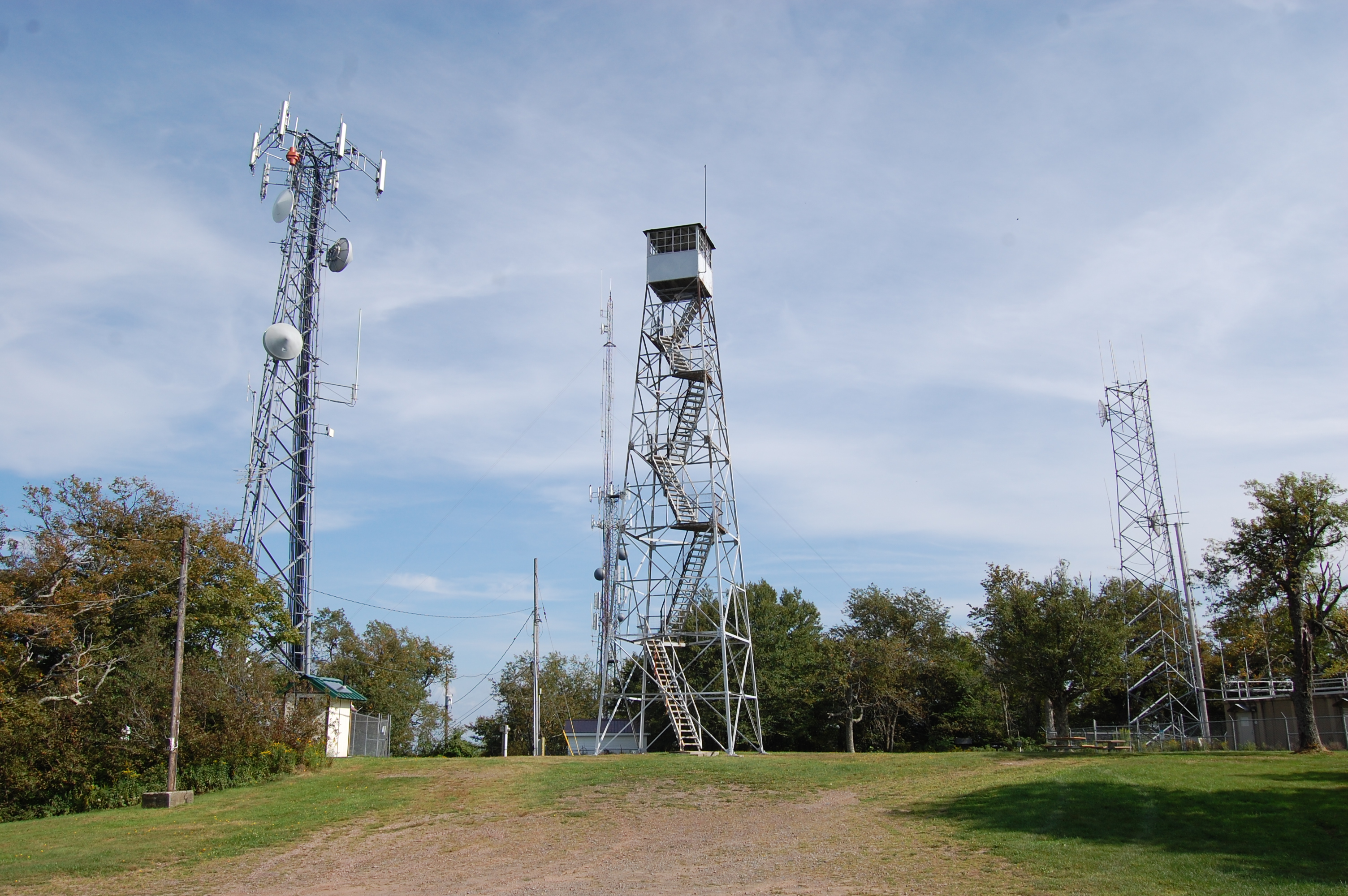
Utsayantha Mountain Fire Tower

In 1889, a prominent citizen who lived in the village of Stamford purchased 20 acres (0.031 mi^{2}) on the top of Utsayantha Mountain. After purchasing the land he built a four-story observation house and deeded the property to the town as a park for public use. In 1934, the Civilian Conservation Corps built a 59-foot-3-inch-tall (18.06 m) International Derrick steel tower on the peak. The tower was closed at the end of the 1989 fire lookout season, and was one of the last operating fire towers in the state. In 2003, negotiations were completed which allowed for the transfer of ownership of the tower to the Village of Stamford. That year, a group was formed to plan for restoration of the tower as well as all other improvements on the mountaintop site. In 2004, restoration work began and was overseen by the Forest Fire Lookout Association. The restorations were completed in July 2005, and a dedication ceremony held. The tower is still maintained and is open to the public. The tower was added to the National Historic Lookout Register on January 3, 2015.

== See also ==
- Utsayantha Lake
