= White Man Mountain (New York) =

Mountain in New York, United States

- Location within New York Location within the United States

Highest point
- Elevation: 3,146 feet (959 m)
- Coordinates: 42°17′04″N 74°32′03″W

Geography
- Location: Grand Gorge, New York, U.S.
- Topo map: USGS Roxbury

White Man Mountain is a mountain located in the Catskill Mountains of New York south-southwest of Grand Gorge. Hack Flats is located east of White Man Mountain and Red Mountain is located south.
