= Utsayantha Lake =

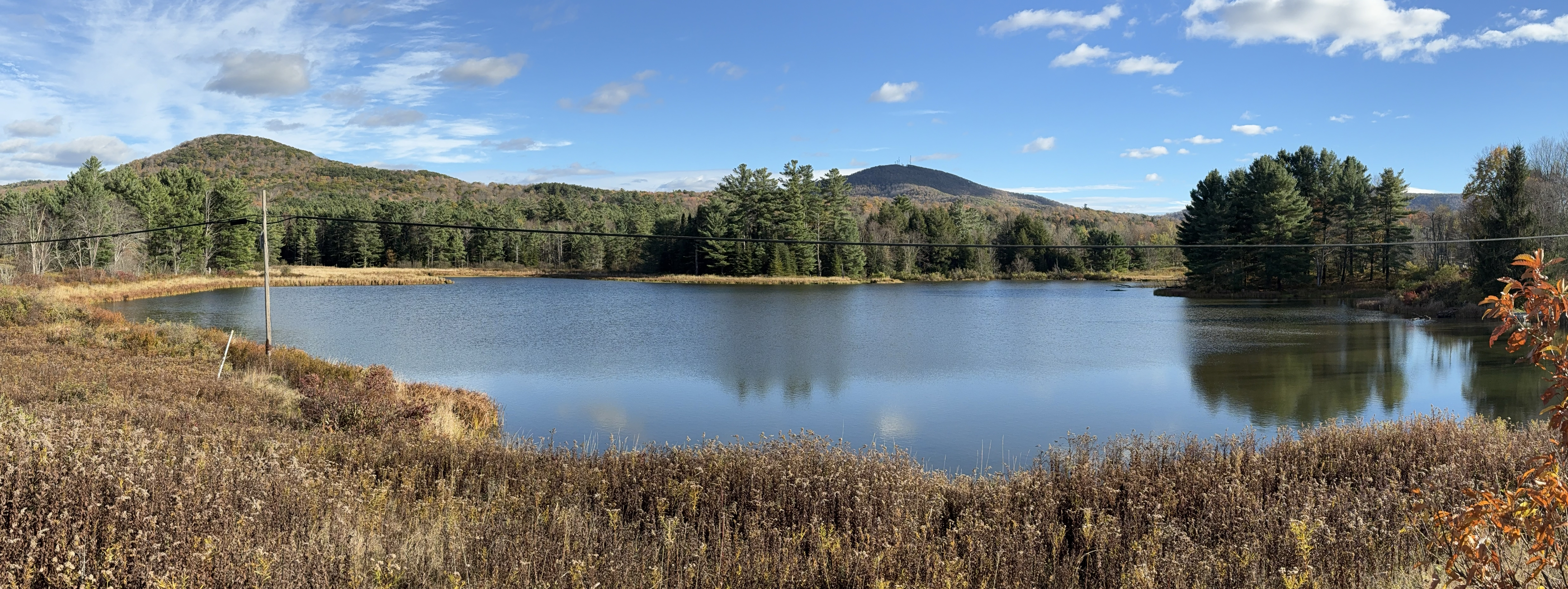
- View of the lake from New York State Route 10

- Location of Utsayantha Lake within New York
- Location: Jefferson, Schoharie County, New York
- Coordinates: 42°25′31″N 74°37′05″W
- Type: Reservoir
- Primary inflows: West Branch Delaware River
- Primary outflows: West Branch Delaware River
- Basin countries: United States
- Surface area: 12 acres (4.9 ha)
- Surface elevation: 1,873 ft (571 m)
- Settlements: Stamford

Utsayantha Lake is a small reservoir located in Jefferson, Schoharie County, New York, north of Stamford. The West Branch Delaware River flows through Utsayantha Lake.

== History ==
Utsayantha Lake is named after Utsayantha, the daughter of Chief Ubiwacha. Chief Ubiwacha was the chief of the Lenape Indians. Utsayantha drowned herself in the lake after seeing her son drowned in the lake.

== See also ==
- List of lakes in New York
