= Silver Lake Mountain =

Mountain of Clinton County, New York, US

Coordinates: 44°31′10.2″N 73°50′26.5″W

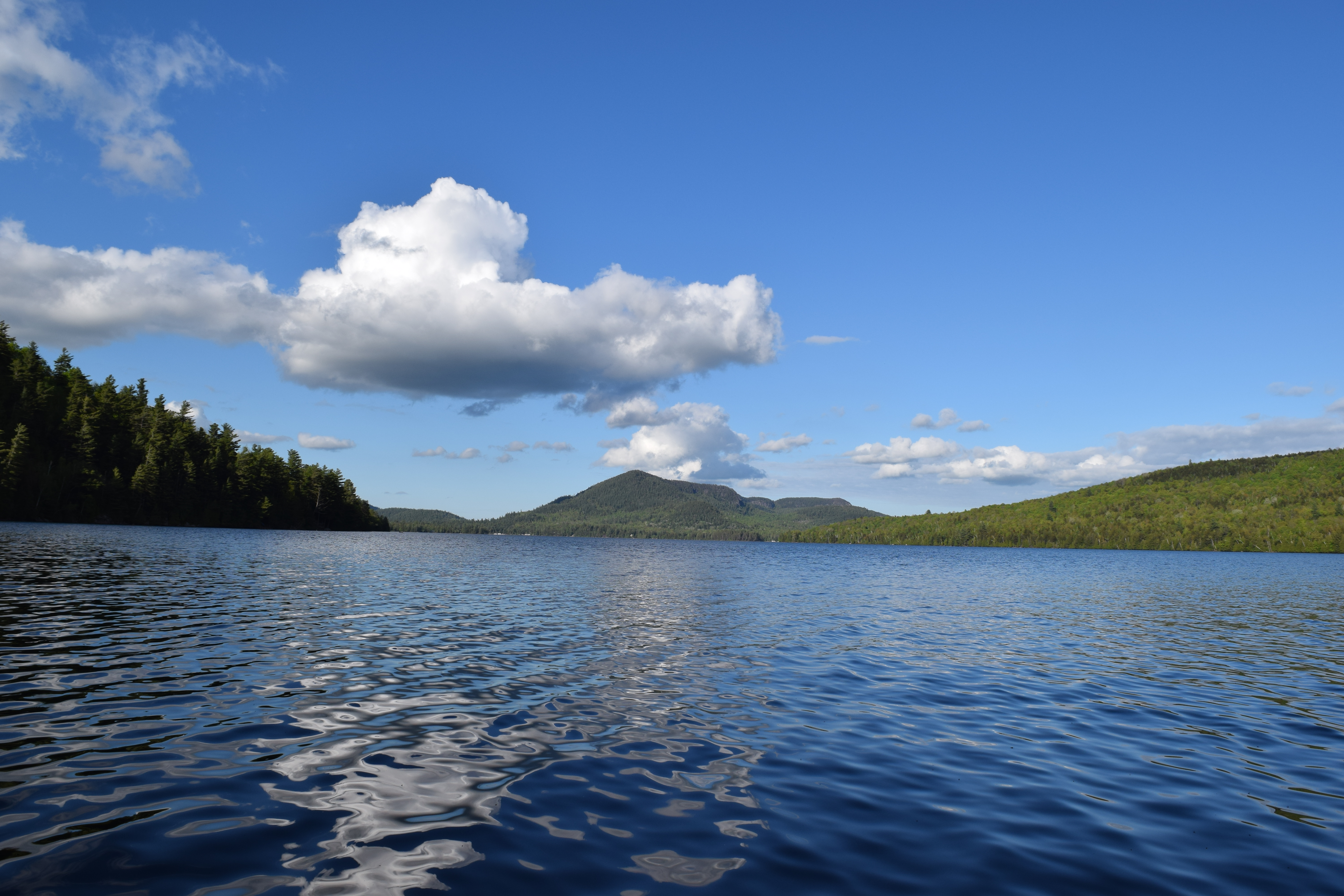
- Silver Lake Mountain from Silver Lake

Highest point
- Elevation: 2372 ft (722.9 m)
- Prominence: 938 ft (286 m)

Geography
- Location: Clinton County, New York
- Parent range: Adirondack Mountains

Climbing
- Easiest route: Hike from Silver Lake Rd Trailhead

Silver Lake Mountain is a 2,372 ft mountain in the North-Eastern Adirondacks located near Au Sable Forks, New York. A trail starting from Silver Lake Road leads 0.9 miles up the mountain to the summit offering views of the surrounding lakes and mountains, including Whiteface Mountain.
