= Huntersfield Mountain =

Mountain in New York, United States

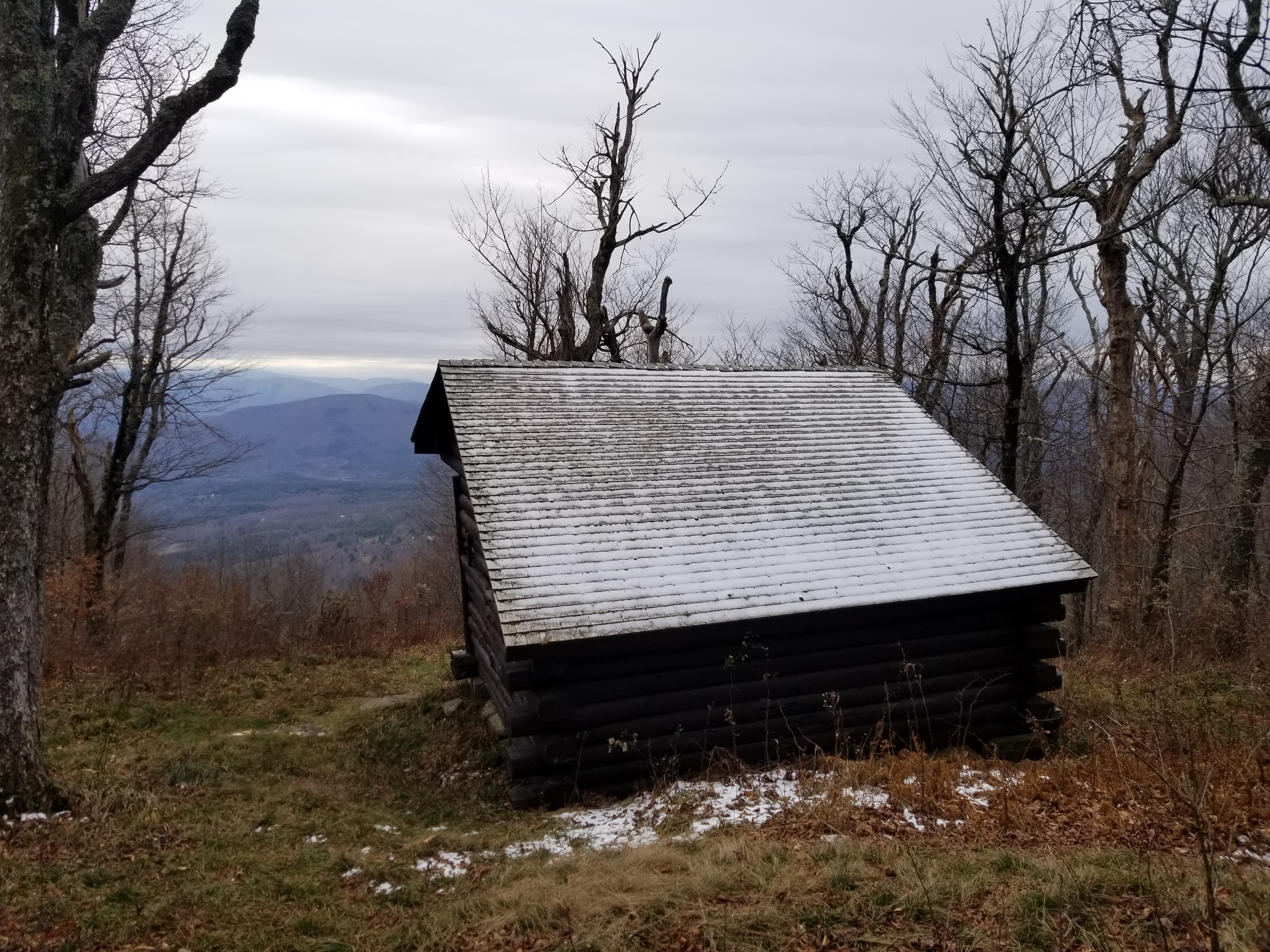
- Lean-to shelter at the summit of Huntersfield Mountain with view to the south

Highest point
- Elevation: 3,422 feet (1,043 m)
- Coordinates: 42°21′20″N 74°20′48″W

Geography
- Location within New York Location within the United States
- Location: Ashland, New York, U.S.
- Topo map: USGS Ashland

Huntersfield Mountain is a mountain located in the Catskill Mountains of New York north-northwest of Ashland. Ashland Pinnacle is located east, and Tower Mountain is located south-southeast of Huntersfield Mountain. It is the highest point in Schoharie County and it is ranked 9 of 62 on the list of New York County High Points.
