= Cradle Rock Ridge =

Mountain in New York, United States

- Location within New York Location within the United States

Highest point
- Elevation: 3,169 feet (966 m)
- Coordinates: 42°02′14″N 74°39′47″W

Geography
- Location: Frost Valley, New York, U.S.
- Topo map: USGS Seager

Cradle Rock Ridge is a mountain located in the Catskill Mountains of New York State, United States, west-northwest of Frost Valley. Mill Brook Ridge is located north/northeast, Woodpecker Ridge is located east, and Mongaup Mountain is located south of Cradle Rock Ridge.
