= Fords Hill =

Mountain in New York, United States

- Location within New York Location within the United States

Highest point
- Elevation: 2,821 feet (860 m)
- Coordinates: 42°10′27″N 74°44′35″W

Geography
- Location: Bovina Center, New York, U.S.
- Topo map: USGS Andes

Fords Hill is a mountain located in the Catskill Mountains of New York southeast of Bovina Center. Fords Hill is located south of Mount Pisgah.
