= Hack Flats =

Mountain in New York, United States

- Location within New York Location within the United States

Highest point
- Elevation: 3,150 feet (960 m)
- Coordinates: 42°17′03″N 74°31′55″W

Geography
- Location: Grand Gorge, New York, U.S.
- Topo map: USGS Roxbury

Hack Flats is a flat located in the Catskill Mountains of New York south-southwest of Grand Gorge. White Man Mountain is located west, Roundtop is located east-northeast, and Red Mountain is located southwest of Hack Flats.
