= Fleischmann Mountain =

Mountain in New York, United States

- Location within New York Location within the United States

Highest point
- Elevation: 2,910 feet (890 m)
- Coordinates: 42°08′36″N 74°33′50″W

Geography
- Location: Arkville, New York, U.S.
- Topo map: USGS Fleischmanns

Fleischmann Mountain is a mountain located in the Catskill Mountains of New York east of Arkville. Hog Mountain is located north of Fleischmann Mountain and Meade Hill is located west.
