= Bramley Mountain =

Mountain in New York State

- Location within New York Location within the United States

Highest point
- Elevation: 2,812 feet (857 m)
- Coordinates: 42°17′51″N 74°49′06″W

Geography
- Location: Bloomville, New York, U.S.
- Topo map: USGS Bloomville

Bramley Mountain is a mountain located in the Catskill Mountains of New York located south of Bloomville and east-northeast of Delhi. Bovina Mountain is located northeast of Bramley Mountain.

== History ==
Bramley Mountain formerly had a fire observation tower at its peak. The tower was an 80 feet (24 m) tall Aermotor LS40 tower erected by the New York State Department of Environmental Conservation in 1950. The tower was closed at the end of the 1970 season.

In 1975, the tower was sold for $50 and removed from the mountaintop. The family that purchased and removed it from the mountain kept the tower in storage. In 2008, the New York City Department of Environmental Protection acquired the parcel that includes Bramley Mountain. The Catskill Mountain Club was allowed to build a trail to the summit in 2016. In January 2020 a group, Friends of Bramley Mountain, was formed to restore the tower to the mountain. In November 2024 it was announced that the group had finished reconstructing the tower on Bramley Mountain's peak.
