= Red Mountain (New York) =

Mountain in New York, United States

- Location within New York Location within the United States

Highest point
- Elevation: 2,952 feet (900 m)
- Coordinates: 42°16′03″N 74°32′58″W

Geography
- Location: Grand Gorge, New York, U.S.
- Topo map: USGS Roxbury

Red Mountain is a mountain located in the Catskill Mountains of New York south-southwest of Grand Gorge. White Man Mountain is located northeast of Red Mountain and Cator Roundtop is located southwest.
