= Mount Warren (New York) =

Mountain in New York, United States

- Location within New York Location within the United States

Highest point
- Elevation: 2,890 feet (880 m)
- Prominence: 140 m (460 ft)
- Coordinates: 42°18′53″N 74°42′17″W

Geography
- Location: South Kortright, New York, U.S.
- Topo map: USGS Hobart

Mount Warren is a mountain located in the Catskill Mountains of New York south of South Kortright. Bovina Mountain is located west-northwest of Mount Warren.
