= Ashland, Greene County, New York =

- Town
- Location in Greene County and the state of New York.
- Coordinates: 42°19′17″N 74°20′21″W
- Country: United States
- State: New York
- County: Greene

Government
  - Type: Town Council
  - Town Supervisor: Richard E. Tompkins (R)
  - Town Council: Members' List: • James Lawrence (R); • Martin Blanden (R); • Dennis E. Mattice (R); • Thomas H. Soule (R)

Area
  - Total: 24.63 sq mi (63.78 km^{2})
  - Land: 24.63 sq mi (63.78 km^{2})
  - Water: 0 sq mi (0.00 km^{2})
- Elevation: 1,932 ft (589 m)

Population (2020)
  - Total: 682
  - Density: 27.7/sq mi (10.7/km^{2})
- Time zone: UTC-5 (Eastern (EST))
  - Summer (DST): UTC-4 (EDT)
- ZIP Codes: 12407 (Ashland); 12468 (Prattsville); 12496 (Windham)
- Area code: 518
- FIPS code: 36-02803
- GNIS feature ID: 0978692
- Website: ashlandny.com

Ashland is a town in Greene County, New York, United States. The population was around 682 based on the 2020 US census, down from 784 in the 2010 census. Ashland is in the northwestern part of the county.

== History ==
Early settlements were abandoned during the American Revolution, but the town was re-settled in 1788. The town was created from parts of the towns of Windham and Prattsville in 1848.

When the town was still part of Windham, it was called Scienceville due to there being "some families of more than ordinary education" in the area. When Scienceville became a separate community in 1848, it was renamed Ashland after the estate of Henry Clay.

The presence of hemlock forests led to a tanning industry. Hemlock bark was an important raw material used for leather tanning, due to it being a good source of tannic acid.

However, Ashland suffered a recession in the early 1850s when its tanning industry collapsed after the community exhausted its supply of hemlock bark. Around the same time, the cotton and wool mills lost business due to being located inland, resulting in expensive transportation rates.

In 1890, the population was 560.

A local YMCA was opened on March 29, 1895, but closed due to a lack of support in 1901.

== Geography ==
According to the United States Census Bureau, the town has a total area of 26.0 square miles (67 km^{2}), all land.

The town is at the northern border of the Catskill Park. The northern town line is the border of Schoharie County.

== Demographics ==
Historical population
| Census | Pop. | Note | %± |
|---|---|---|---|
| 1850 | 1,290 | | — |
| 1860 | 1,212 | | −6.0% |
| 1870 | 992 | | −18.2% |
| 1880 | 899 | | −9.4% |
| 1890 | 787 | | −12.5% |
| 1900 | 692 | | −12.1% |
| 1910 | 640 | | −7.5% |
| 1920 | 560 | | −12.5% |
| 1930 | 482 | | −13.9% |
| 1940 | 566 | | 17.4% |
| 1950 | 542 | | −4.2% |
| 1960 | 548 | | 1.1% |
| 1970 | 397 | | −27.6% |
| 1980 | 744 | | 87.4% |
| 1990 | 803 | | 7.9% |
| 2000 | 752 | | −6.4% |
| 2010 | 784 | | 4.3% |
| 2020 | 682 | | −13.0% |
U.S. Decennial Census 2020

As of the census of 2000, there were 752 people, 304 households, and 214 families residing in the town. The population density was 29.0 inhabitants per square mile (11.2/km^{2}). There were 603 housing units at an average density of 23.2 per square mile (9.0/km^{2}). The racial makeup of the town was 97.21% White, 0.53% African American, 0.13% Native American, 0.53% Asian, and 1.60% from two or more races. Hispanic or Latino of any race were 2.93% of the population.

There were 304 households, out of which 28.0% had children under the age of 18 living with them, 57.9% were married couples living together, 6.9% had a female householder with no husband present, and 29.6% were non-families. 22.7% of all households were made up of individuals, and 9.2% had someone living alone who was 65 years of age or older. The average household size was 2.47 and the average family size was 2.89.

In the town, the population was spread out, with 23.3% under the age of 18, 5.7% from 18 to 24, 26.1% from 25 to 44, 28.3% from 45 to 64, and 16.6% who were 65 years of age or older. The median age was 42 years. For every 100 females, there were 101.1 males. For every 100 females age 18 and over, there were 93.0 males.

The median income for a household in the town was $35,357, and the median income for a family was $42,031. Males had a median income of $34,750 versus $28,125 for females. The per capita income for the town was $18,029. About 9.8% of families and 15.8% of the population were below the poverty line, including 29.2% of those under age 18 and 8.6% of those age 65 or over.

== Communities and locations in Ashland ==
- Ashland – The hamlet of Ashland is in the southern part of the town on Route 23. It is located at the edge of the Catskill Park and at the southern town line. An early name for the community was "Scienceville".
- Batavia Kill – A westward-flowing stream that passes Ashland village.
- Four Corners – A hamlet on the western town line.
- North Settlement – A hamlet northeast of Ashland village, located on Route 10 by the eastern town line.
- West Settlement – A hamlet northwest of Ashland village, located on Route 10.
