= Bovina Center Historic District =

Historic district in New York, United States

- U.S. National Register of Historic Places
- U.S. Historic district
- Location within New York Location within the United States
- Location: Roughly Co. Rt. 6, Creamery Rd., Maple and Pink Sts., Bovina Center, New York
- Coordinates: 42°15′34″N 74°47′20″W
- Area: 700 acres (280 ha)
- Architectural style: Late Victorian
- NRHP reference No.: 00000574
- Added to NRHP: June 02, 2000

Bovina Center Historic District is a national historic district located at Bovina Center in Delaware County, New York. The district contains 133 contributing buildings and one contributing structure.

It was listed on the National Register of Historic Places in 2000.

== See also ==
- National Register of Historic Places listings in Delaware County, New York
