= Bovina, New York =

- Town
- Location within New York Location within the United States
- Coordinates: 42°15′39″N 74°46′56″W
- Country: United States
- State: New York
- County: Delaware

Government
  - Type: Town Council
  - Town Supervisor: Tina B. Mole (R)
  - Town Council: Members' List: • Evelyn Stewart (D); • Gerald Wright (R); • Charles McIntosh (R); • Mark Rossley ()

Area
  - Total: 44.49 sq mi (115.24 km^{2})
  - Land: 44.26 sq mi (114.64 km^{2})
  - Water: 0.23 sq mi (0.60 km^{2})
- Elevation: 1,729 ft (527 m)

Population (2020)
  - Total: 658
- Time zone: UTC-5 (Eastern (EST))
  - Summer (DST): UTC-4 (EDT)
- ZIP Codes: 13740 (Bovina Center); 13753 (Delhi); 13731 (Andes)
- FIPS code: 36-025-07597
- GNIS feature ID: 0978745
- Website: bovinany.org

Bovina is a town in Delaware County, New York, United States. The population was 663 at the 2025 census. The name "Bovina" was suggested by General Erastus Root, who noted the area's fitness for grazing. Bovina is an interior town in the eastern part of the county.

== History ==
The town formed in 1820 from parts of the towns of Delhi, Stamford, and Middletown. The town's population was around 1,200 at its creation, but after reaching a peak in the 1840s, it steadily declined. The town became noted for the quality of its dairy products, especially butter, in the late 19th century.

The Burns Family Farm was listed on the National Register of Historic Places in 2007.

== Geography ==
The town has some of the highest uplands in the county. The elevation of the highest point exceeds 3,340 feet (1,020 m) above sea level, on an unnamed summit at the eastern corner of the town overlooking the Plattekill Mountain ski area in neighboring Roxbury.

According to the United States Census Bureau, the town of Bovina has a total area of 44.5 square miles (115.2 km^{2}), of which 44.2 square miles (114.6 km^{2}) is land and 0.2 square miles (0.6 km^{2}), or 0.52%, is water.

== Demographics ==
Historical population
Census	Pop.	Note	%±
1820	1,207		—
1830	1,346		11.5%
1840	1,403		4.2%
1850	1,316		−6.2%
1860	1,242		−5.6%
1870	1,022		−17.7%
1880	1,022		0.0%
1890	1,007		−1.5%
1900	932		−7.4%
1910	912		−2.1%
1920	858		−5.9%
1930	771		−10.1%
1940	806		4.5%
1950	711		−11.8%
1960	594		−16.5%
1970	506		−14.8%
1980	562		11.1%
1990	550		−2.1%
2000	664		20.7%
2010	633		−4.7%
2020	658		3.9%
U.S. Decennial Census

As of the census of 2000, there were 664 people, 277 households, and 193 families residing in the town. The population density was 15.0 inhabitants per square mile (5.8/km^{2}). There were 521 housing units at an average density of 11.7 per square mile (4.5/km^{2}). The racial makeup of the town was 98.34% White, 0.15% African American, 0.45% Native American, 0.30% Asian, 0.15% from other races, and 0.60% from two or more races. Hispanic or Latino of any race were 2.71% of the population.

There were 277 households, out of which 24.5% had children under the age of 18 living with them, 60.3% were married couples living together, 5.8% had a female householder with no husband present, and 30.3% were non-families. 22.7% of all households were made up of individuals, and 11.2% had someone living alone who was 65 years of age or older. The average household size was 2.40 and the average family size was 2.78.

In the town, the population was spread out, with 19.9% under the age of 18, 5.6% from 18 to 24, 22.6% from 25 to 44, 30.1% from 45 to 64, and 21.8% who were 65 years of age or older. The median age was 46 years. For every 100 females, there were 101.2 males. For every 100 females age 18 and over, there were 105.4 males.

The median income for a household in the town was $43,359, and the median income for a family was $46,094. Males had a median income of $30,875 versus $21,442 for females. The per capita income for the town was $19,653. About 3.4% of families and 5.7% of the population were below the poverty line, including 4.7% of those under age 18 and 2.6% of those age 65 or over.

== Communities and locations in Bovina ==
- Bovina
- Bovina Center - The Bovina Center Historic District was listed on the National Register of Historic Places in 2000.
