= Aermotor Windmill Company =

American Windmill Manufacturer

Coordinates: 31°25′03″N 100°25′07″W

- Industry: Wind power
- Headquarters: San Angelo, Texas, United States
- Products: Windmills, wind-powered water pumps
- Website: https://aermotorwindmill.com/

The Aermotor Windmill Company, or Aermotor Company, is an American manufacturer of wind-powered water pumps. The widespread use of their distinctive wind pumps on ranches throughout the arid plains and deserts of the United States has made their design a quintessential image of the American West.

The company also manufactured galvanized steel fire lookout towers under the "Aermotor Corporation" name, including a "7 x 7" model which supported a 7-by-7-foot (2.1 m × 2.1 m) steel cab at heights from 35 feet (11 m) to 175 feet (53 m). Hundreds of this model were in use in the southeastern U.S.; a dozen survived in the Northwestern U.S. in 1984.

== History ==
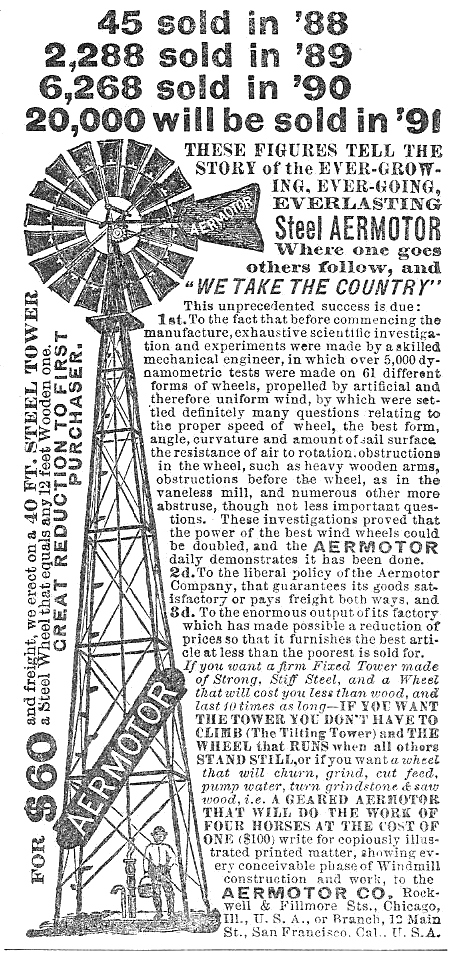
1891 ad

La Verne Noyes, founder of Aermotor Windmill Company, had hired engineer Thomas O. Perry for a different job but saw the potential of the all-metal windpump developed by Perry after extensive experiments. The first Aermotor was sold in 1888, with 24 windmills in total being sold in the first year. Aermotor soon became a strong competitor among its contemporaries selling over 20,000 of its windmills by 1892. Over the next 30 years Aermotor grew and expanded, introducing accessories and variants on "the mathematical windmill."

La Verne Noyes died in 1919. He left the Aermotor Company to a tax paying trust, with 48 colleges and universities as beneficiaries.

Aermotor continued to innovate and manufacture windmills throughout World War II and helped to produce the top secret Norden bombsight.

During the latter part of the century ownership of the Aermotor Company changed hands and had its operation moved and expanded to new venues, including the country of Argentina; Broken Arrow, Oklahoma; Brentwood, Missouri; and Conway, Arkansas. By 1981, 80% of all windmills manufactured in The United States had their genesis in Conway. In 1998 Aermotor was purchased by Kees Verheul, as owner and president. It now operates from a 40,000-square-foot (3,700 m^{2}) facility in San Angelo, Texas. In 2006, the company was purchased by a group of West Texas ranchers, and the name restored to its original from 1888..."The Aermotor Company".

== Products ==
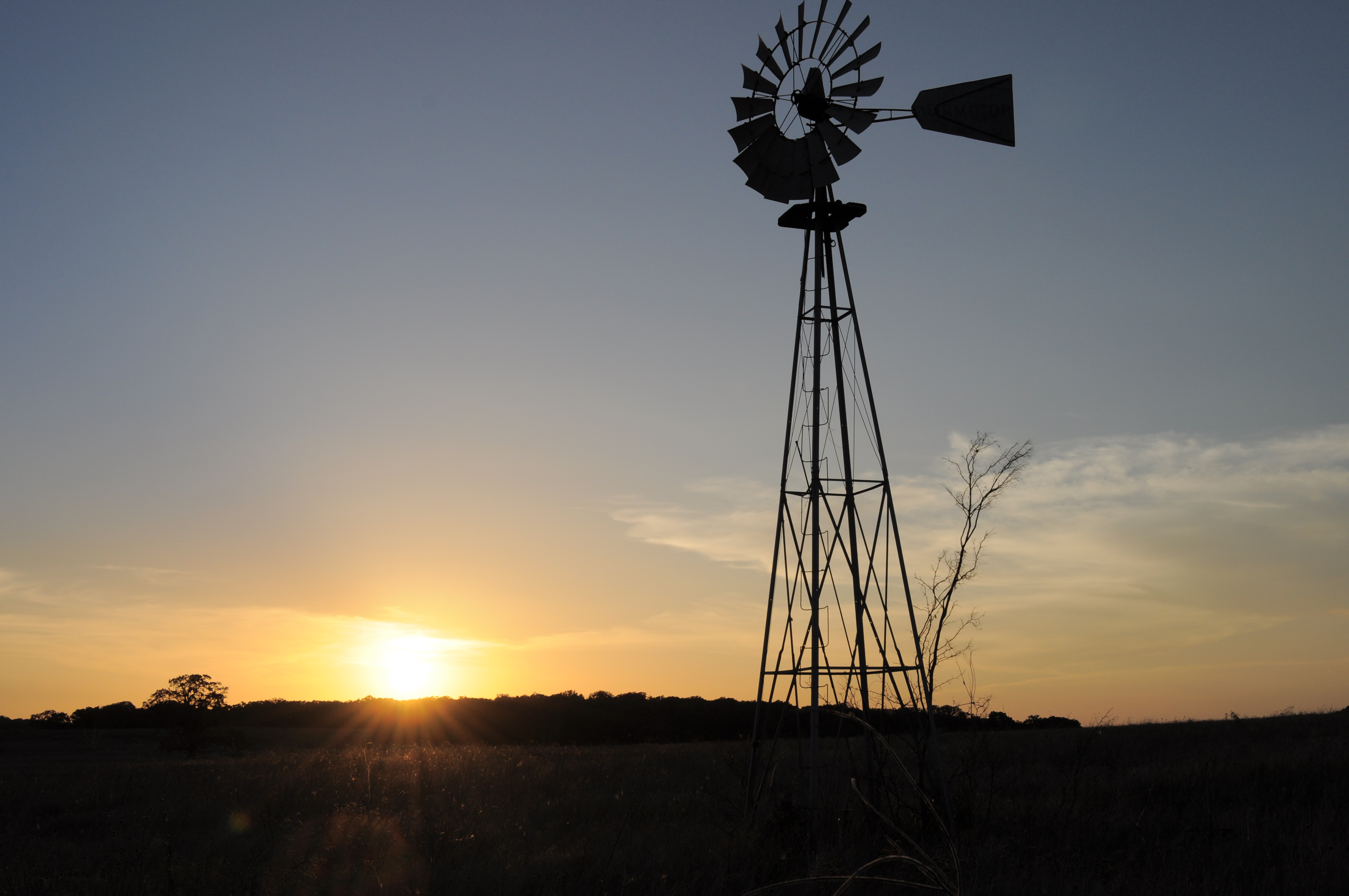
An Aermotor water-pumping windmill in Texas near Denton

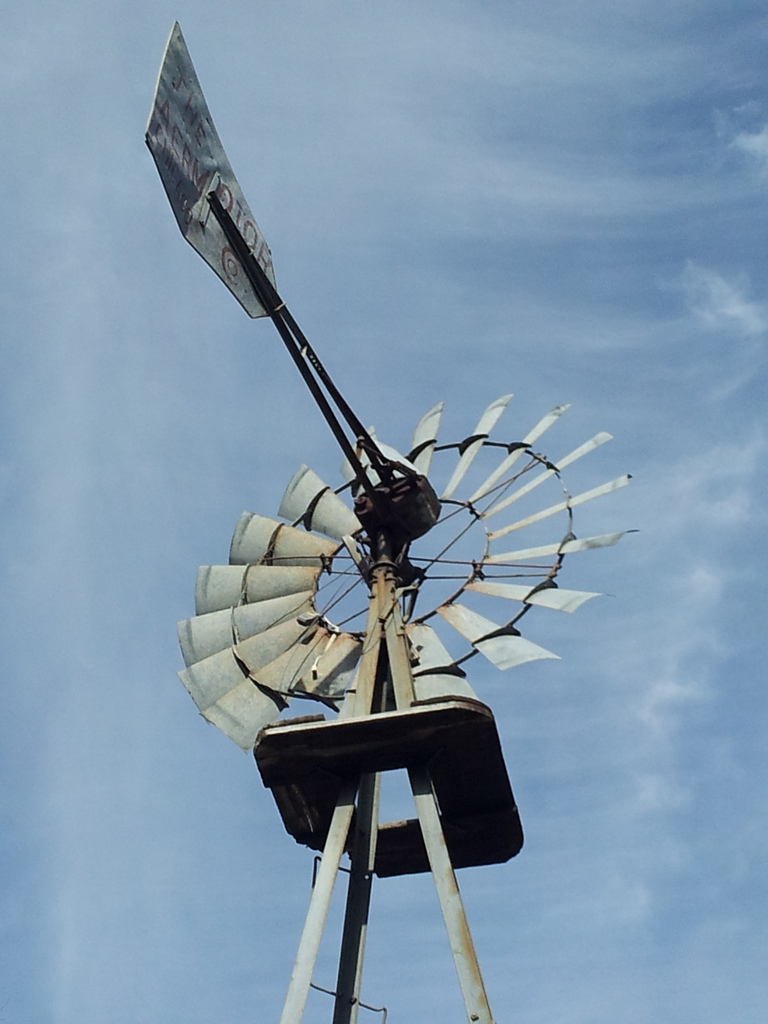
The defunct Aermotor Windmill at Gekeler Farms in Idaho

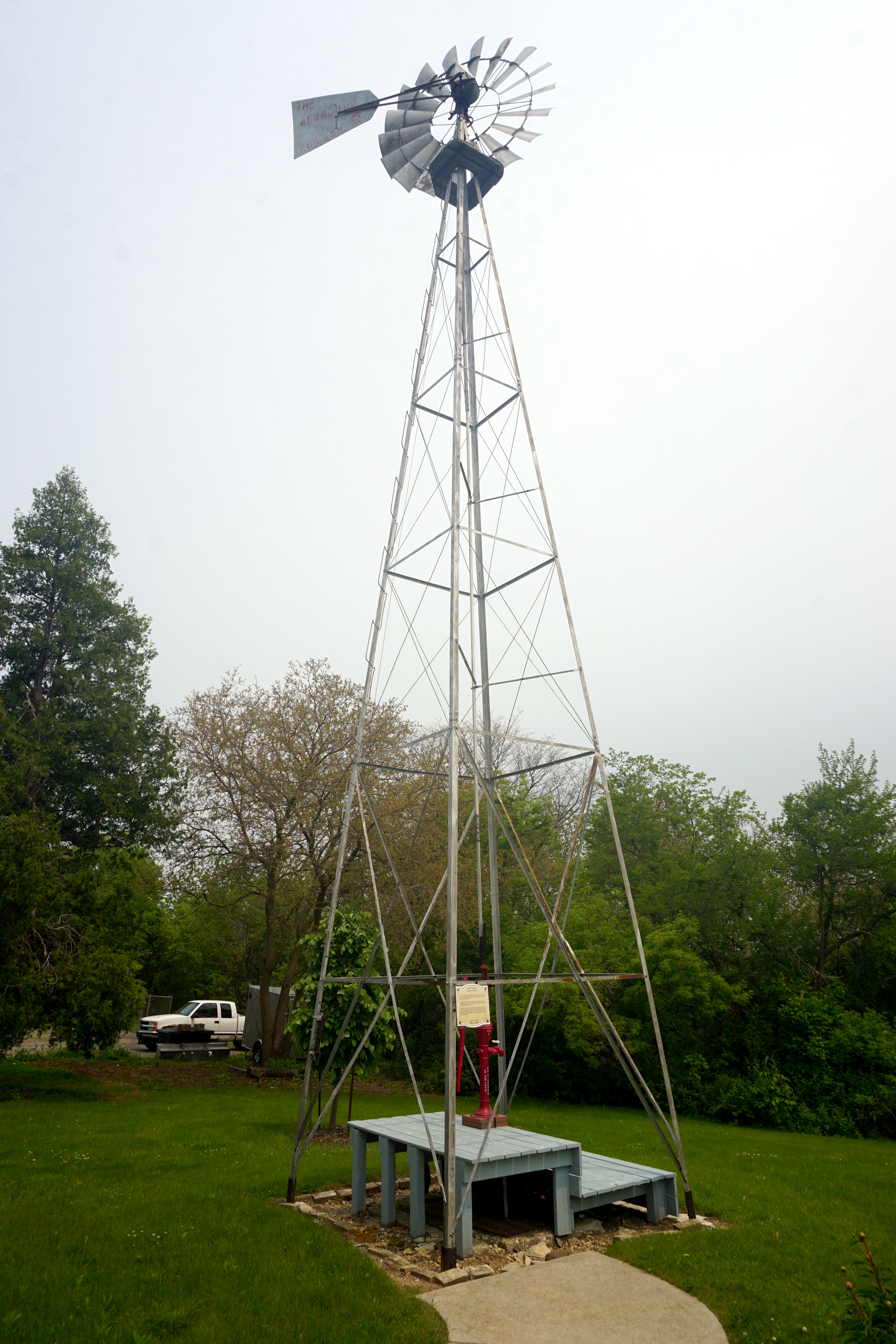
Aermotor windpump at the New Berlin Historical Society in New Berlin, Wisconsin

Besides the production of windmills from 6 to 16 feet (1.8 to 4.9 m) tall, Aermotor also produces the towers on which a windmill sits. Four post towers come in steel (ranging from 21 to 60 feet or 6.4 to 18.3 meters tall) and wood (from 14 to 37 feet or 4.3 to 11.3 meters tall). Aermotor also produces and helps in procurement of the pump assembly and drilling.

=== List of Aermotor fire towers and windmills on the National Register of Historic Places ===
- Arab Mountain Fire Observation Station, Arab Mountain, Piercefield, New York
- Azure Mountain Fire Observation Station, Azure Mountain, Waverly, New York
- Balsam Lake Mountain Fire Observation Station, Balsam Lake Mountain, Hardenburgh, New York
- Blue Mountain Fire Observation Station, Blue Mountain, Indian Lake, New York
- Carey Dome Fire Lookout, Nez Perce National Forest, Burgdorf, Idaho
- Crossroads Fire Tower, Hamburg, Arkansas
- Hadley Mountain Fire Observation Station, Hadley Mountain, Hadley, New York
- Hurricane Mountain Fire Observation Station, Hurricane Mountain Summit, Keene, New York
- John Muir National Historic Site, Martinez, California
- Kane Mountain Fire Observation Station, Kane Mountain, Caroga, New York
- Lake Mountain Lookout, Lake Mountain, Lakeside, Arizona
- Loon Lake Mountain Fire Observation Station, summit of Loon Lake Mountain, Franklin, New York
- McKenzie Windmill, TN 58, Georgetown, Tennessee
- Mount Adams Fire Observation Station, Mount Adams, Newcomb, New York
- Mt. Beacon Fire Observation Tower, S. Beacon Mountain, Beacon, New York
- Mount Tremper Fire Observation Station, Mount Tremper, Shandaken, New York
- Mountain Fire Lookout Tower, Forest Service Rd. 2335 (Tower Rd.) Lakewood Ranger District, Nicolet National Forest Riverview, Wisconsin
- Poke-O-Moonshine Mountain Fire Observation Station, Poke-O-Moonshine Mountain, Chesterfield, New York
- PS Knoll Lookout, Apache-Sitgreaves National Forest, Maverick, Arizona
- Red Hill Fire Observation Station, Red Hill, Denning, New York
- Snowy Mountain Fire Observation Station, Snowy Mountain, Indian Lake, New York
- St. Regis Mountain Fire Observation Station, St. Regis Mountain, Santa Clara, New York
- Utsayantha Mountain Fire Observation Station, Utsayantha Mountain, Stamford, New York
- Wakely Mountain Fire Observation Station, Wakely Mountain, Lake Pleasant, New York
- Warren County Fire Tower, 4.5 mi. south of Warrenton on NC 58 S, Liberia, North Carolina

== Philanthropy ==
In 1918, the founder of Aermotor Windmill Company, La Verne Noyes, donated nearly $2.5 million USD to establish scholarships for veterans of World War I. The largest benefactors were University of Chicago and Iowa State University in Ames, Iowa, La Verne's alma mater. These scholarships are still available today. In 1913, Noyes gave funds to the University of Chicago for a women's building which is the current Ida Noyes Hall, named for his wife.
