= Sundown Wild Forest =

Coordinates: 41°55′15″N 74°26′45″W

The Sundown Wild Forest is part of the New York State Forest Preserve managed by the Department of Environmental Conservation, spanning 30,100 acres (12,200 ha) in the southeastern Catskill Mountains in Sullivan and Ulster County, within Catskill Park.

The Sundown Wild Forest features rugged ridges, with ten peaks above 2,000 feet. The highest peak is 3,081-foot (939 m) Ashokan High Point. Some particular waterfalls in the forest are Vernooy Kill Falls, and Buttermilk Falls.

Sundown Wild Forest is situated in the towns of Denning, New York, Shandaken, Hardenburgh, and Olive, managed by the NYSDEC.

One popular feature of the forest is the Peekamoose Blue Hole, a famous crystal clear swimming hole on Rondout Creek.

== History ==
Most of the land of the wild forest traces its private ownership to the Hardenbergh patent of the 18th century, and during the 19th century, the region was active during the Catskills Tanneries Era.

Recently, the park has been expanding with more trees over the past 21st century, with new landmarks like the Red Hill Fire Observation Station.
