= Catskill Mountain fire towers =

Network of firewatch towers in New York, United States

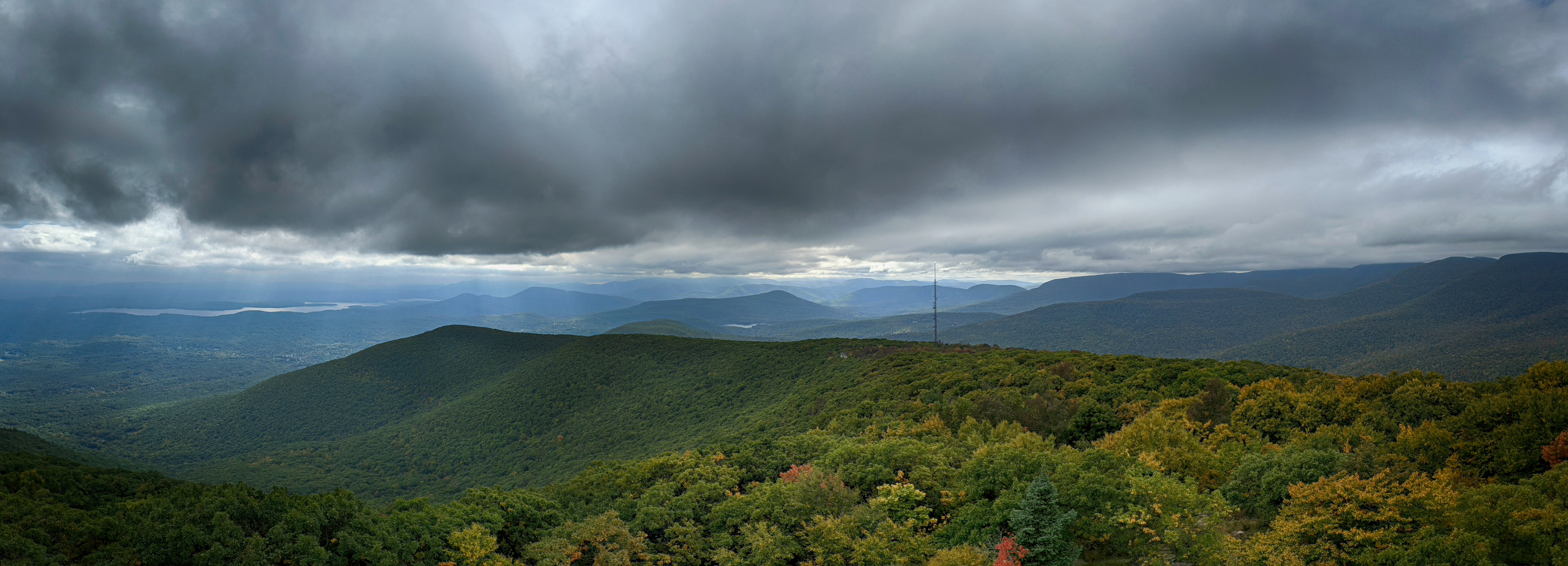
View From Overlook Mountain Fire Tower

The Catskill Mountain fire towers were constructed to facilitate forest fire prevention and control in the Catskill Mountains of New York. 23 towers were built between 1908 and 1950. The towers fell into disuse by the 1970s as fire spotting from airplanes became more effective, and were gradually decommissioned. The Hunter Mountain Fire Tower was the last to be taken out of service in 1990. Most of the towers have been dismantled, but the five remaining towers have been renovated and opened to the public for observation: the aforementioned Hunter Mountain tower, the Balsam Lake Mountain Fire Observation Station, Overlook Mountain Tower in Woodstock, Tremper Mountain Fire Tower in the town of Shandaken and Red Hill Fire Tower in the town of Denning.

== History ==
=== Catskill fire protection before towers ===
When the Catskill Park was created in 1885, one of the state's earliest missions was the control and suppression of forest fires which had long ravaged the land and damaged local crops and property. Wardens were hired to patrol railroad lines, where stray ashes from steam engines often ignited surrounding brush, and investigate reports of fires started by logging or quarrying operations on state land (illegal under the legislation that created New York's Forest Preserve, now Article 14 of the state constitution).

The FFGC (Forest, Fish and Game Commission, the DEC's predecessor) was understaffed and unable to focus on fire prevention. Severe fires during droughts in 1903 and 1908 caused thousands of dollars in damages and led to public calls for better fire control efforts. In December 1908, FFGC head James Whipple sought advice from agencies in other states. His counterpart in Maine, E.E. Ring, recommended the use of strategically placed observation towers, stating that "one man located at a station will do far more effectual work in discovering and locating fires than a hundred men already patrolling."

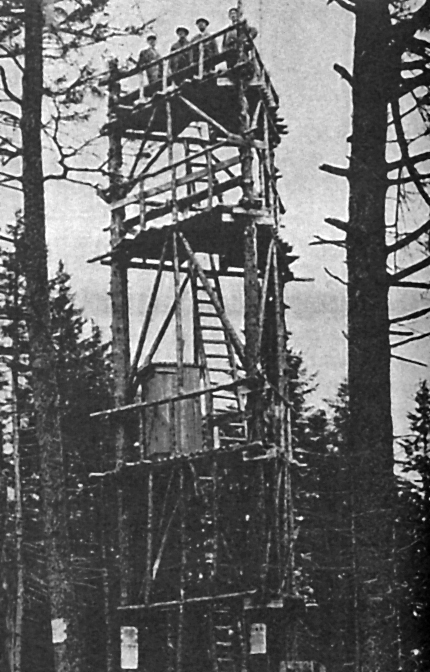
Wooden tower installed at Hunter Mountain in 1909

=== Tower construction ===
An informal system of observation towers which already existed on some summits provided excellent places to station the first trained observers, who could see vast portions of the range and report the location of new fires quickly via dedicated telephone lines. The area around Hunter had historically been very fire-prone, due to heavy logging (less than one square mile or 2.6 square kilometres of virgin forest remains on the mountain) and lightning strikes. The following year, forest rangers built the first Hunter Mountain fire tower, a 40-foot (12.2 m) structure made from three trees, on level ground near the summit. It was one of the first fire lookout towers in the Catskills. Observers stood on an open platform and at first had to live in a nearby tent, until a cabin was built.

== Abandonment and revival ==
In 1996, Hunter and the other four towers were added to the Historic Lookout Register, and then to the National Register the following year. Local committees raised money for their repair, and in 1999 the tower on Overlook Mountain was the first to be reopened to the public. The Catskill Center for Conservation and Development has worked in partnership with the New York State Department of Environmental Conservation since the early 1990s to maintain the remaining 5 historic Catskills fire towers (Hunter, Balsam Lake, Tremper, Overlook, and Red Hill), and to interpret them seasonally for hikers and visitors.
