= Red Hill Fire Observation Station =

- U.S. National Register of Historic Places
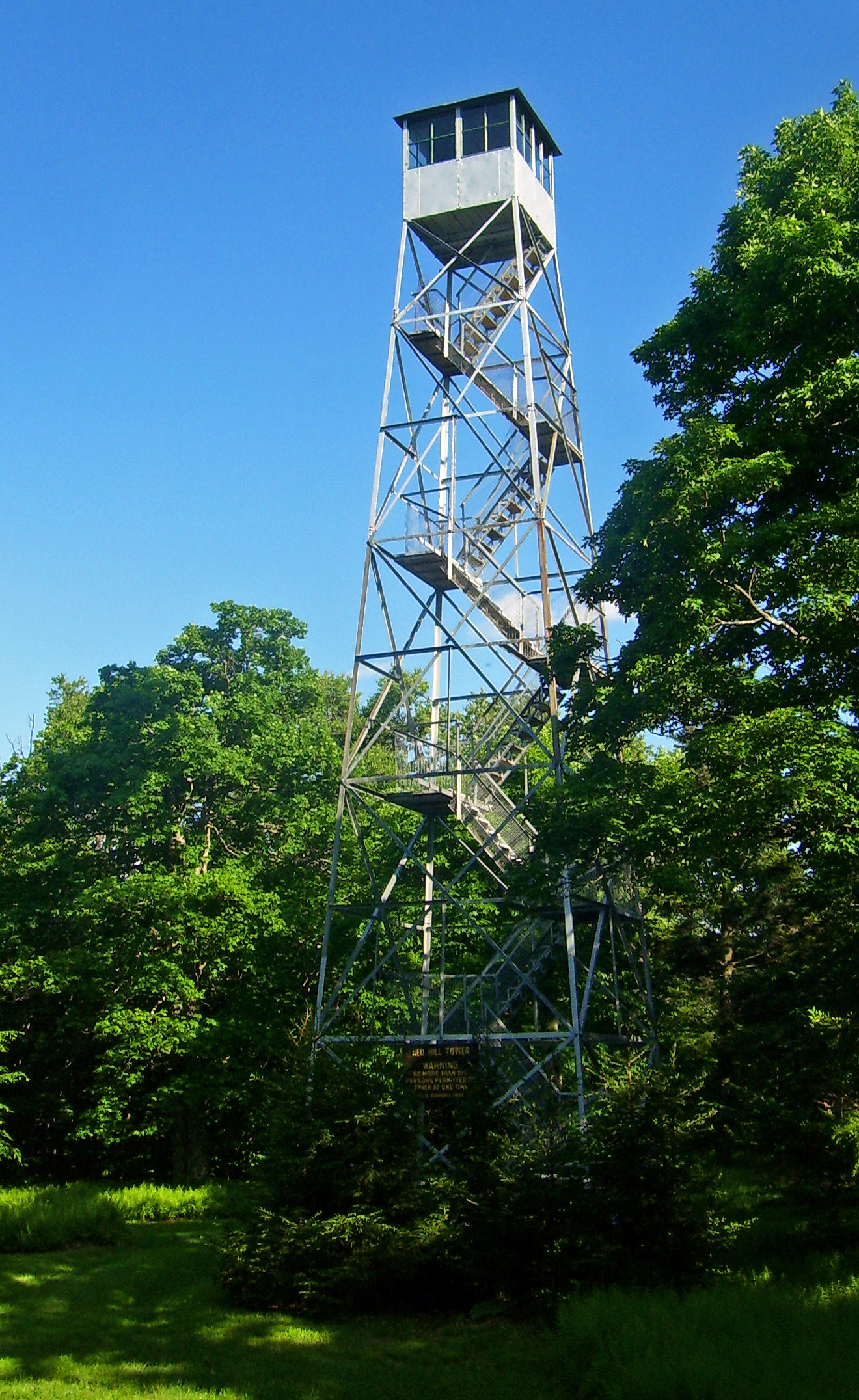
- Fire tower in 2008
- Location: Denning, New York
- Nearest city: Kingston, New York
- Coordinates: 41°55′25″N 74°31′02″W
- Built: 1920
- Architect: Aermotor Corp.
- MPS: Fire Observation Stations of New York State Forest Preserve MPS
- NRHP reference No.: 01001030
- Added to NRHP: 2001

The Red Hill Fire Observation Station consists of a fire lookout tower, cabin and pit privy located on state land in the Sundown Wild Forest, at the summit of Red Hill, a 2,990-foot (910 m) Catskill Mountain peak in Denning, New York, United States. It is the southernmost fire tower in the Catskill Park.

One of the last state towers built, in 1920, it filled a missing link in the Catskills' forest fire detection network. Except for a few brief periods of closure, observers working for the state conservation agencies staffed the tower through 1990, making it the last fire tower closed in the Catskills. The abandoned tower and its views of the region remained a popular destination for local hikers, and it was slated to be torn down in accordance with state policy prohibiting nonessential structures on Forest Preserve land. Preservationists and forest historians campaigned to save and restore it and four other Catskill fire towers, and in the early 21st century they were listed on the National Register of Historic Places (NRHP). Red Hill's observer's cabin, included as part of the listing, is one of the oldest such buildings in New York.

A short trail was constructed to provide access to hikers, since the road used by the observers was later closed by the private landowner. Hikers continue to climb the peak and tower for its views of the Catskill High Peaks to the north.

== Property ==
The tower is a 60-foot (18 m) high steel frame Aermotor structure, anchored by bolts into the exposed bedrock, with a glazed steel cab on top reached by an eight-flight staircase. It is located in a grassy clearing of roughly 500 square feet (46 m^{2}), just east of the mountain's summit, along a narrow ridge. At the clearing's west end, the upper end of the trail and the mountain's true summit, is the rustic one-room cabin where observers lived during their shifts in the tower. Just to its north is a small wooden privy. Two picnic tables are in the area between the cabin and the tower.

The cabin is a small, one-story, 14-by-24-foot (4.3 by 7.3 m) gable-roofed frame building. It is sided with "brainstorm", edge board stained reddish brown. It has a mortared rubblestone foundation and a covered porch on the south elevation, originally decked in wood but since replaced with concrete. Built in 1931, it is one of the oldest remaining observer's cabins in New York, a rare intact example of the earlier style used by the then-state Conservation Commission.

The tower and cabin are old enough to be considered contributing resources to the NRHP listing. The privy and picnic tables were added later for the convenience of hikers, and are not contributing.

== History ==
=== Construction ===
The biggest challenge to New York following the establishment of the Forest Preserve in 1885 had been fire control and prevention. Illegal logging operations often disposed of their remaining slash by setting it on fire without remaining to make sure it burned out safely and sparks from the steam locomotives of the region's railroads also caused conflagrations.

In 1889 members of the Balsam Lake Club built the Catskills' first fire tower on the summit of Balsam Lake Mountain; twenty years later, after the fires two drought-plagued summers had taken a heavy toll on the forests, the state's Forest, Fish and Game Commission (FFGC) took it over as part of a new strategy, proven successful in Maine. of putting trained observers in strategically placed towers to spot the first traces of fire and report its location via dedicated telephone lines. The state built its first tower on Greene County's highest peak, Hunter Mountain later in 1909, and within a decade there were several others throughout the range and in the nearby Shawangunks.

In 1919, the Conservation Commission, which the FFGC had become, found that there was still a large area of the southern Catskills, in Sullivan and Ulster counties, poorly served by the existing towers. Red Hill was chosen as the site for a new tower (supposedly after political pressure forced the state to reconsider Sullivan County's Denman Mountain to the south), and early in 1920 a forest ranger brought the disassembled tower up to the summit via horse-drawn wagon. A state crew cut a road through the Dibble farm up from nearby Red Hill Road, strung the telephone line along it, and put up the tower and cabin later that year.

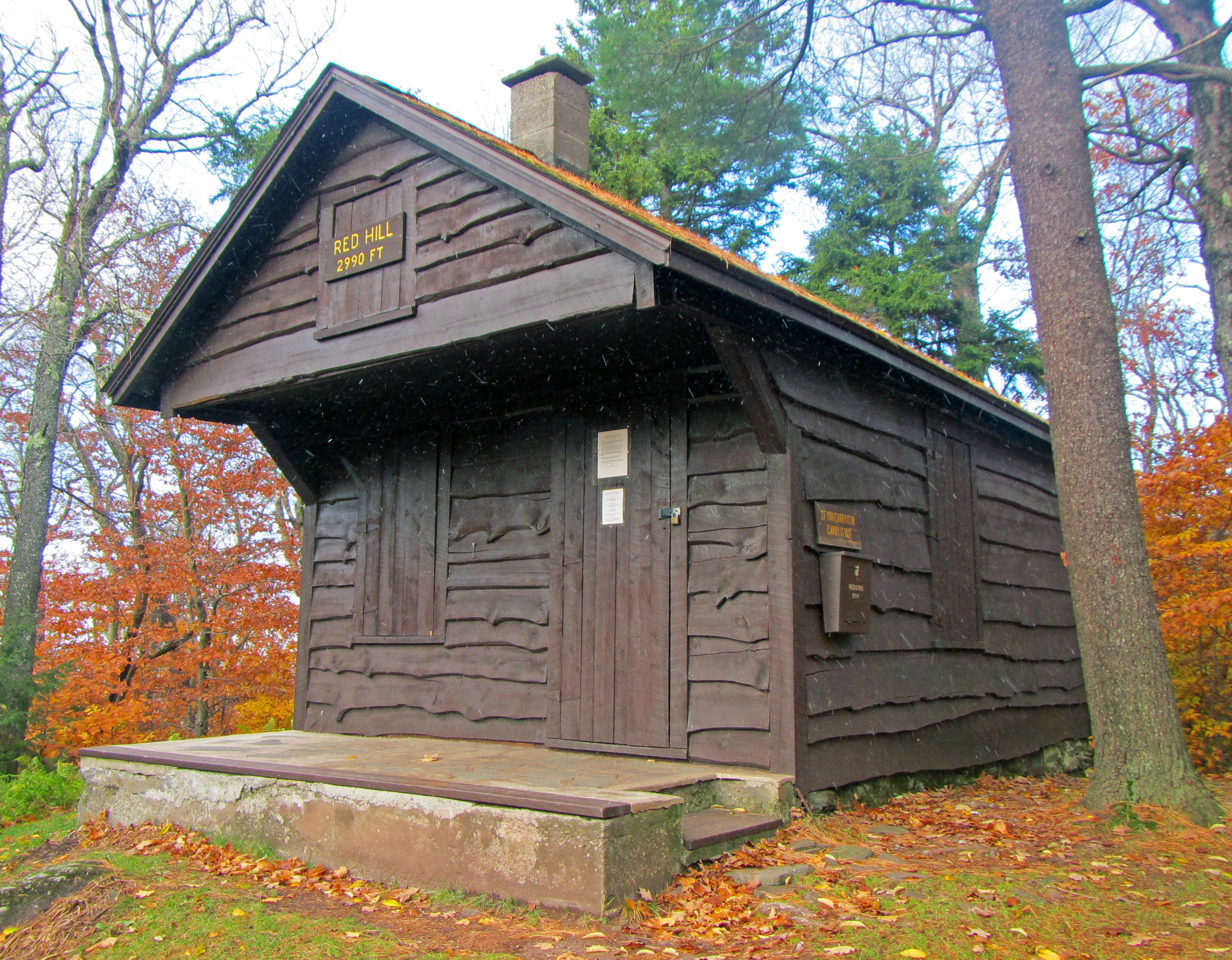
North elevation of cabin.

=== Active use ===
The cabin was replaced with the current one in 1931. There were no other changes to the site during its years of use. Former observers spoke fondly of the job, whose only serious risk was lightning strikes on the tower while they were in it, which slightly injured a few of them. Many of them kept busy during idle stretches by maintaining the road and telephone line, and hobbies such as woodcarving. They also entertained hikers and other visitors who came up the road from the Dibble farm. It was sometimes necessary for them to live off the land, harvesting wild plants, particularly leeks, and game in the nearby woods, as the cabin had no electricity. They drew their water from a spring at the base of a small cliff on the mountain's west slope, about 0.3 miles (0.48 km) from the tower via a short path.

In 1971 the state briefly closed the tower, but it was reopened the next year due to problems with communications in that region. The Dibbles sold their farm in the early 1980s, and the new owner was not as hospitable to hikers, closing it off to all but state access per its easement. Shortly afterward it was closed, as the fire risk to the region had declined since the early 20th century due to the decline of the railroads and logging and the public's greater vigilance in reporting fires. But a renewed period of heavy fires led the state to reopen it in 1987. This time it remained in use until 1990, the last fire tower in the Catskills to be closed.

=== Preservation and restoration ===
George Profous, a forester for what had by then become the state's Department of Environmental Conservation (DEC) wrote in an early 1990s planning document that the aged, deteriorating tower should be dismantled and removed, not only due to its age but because, out of use, it was no longer permitted on state-owned Forest Preserve land, which New York's constitution requires be kept forever wild. Worried residents of Denning and the nearby hamlet of Claryville contacted the Catskill Center for Conservation and Development, a regional advocacy group, to see what they could do to save it, a development Profous had been hoping for. DEC's guidelines governing the use of the Forest Preserve do allow the retention of otherwise incompatible structures within it if they enhance the public's understanding of the Forest Preserve, and many visitors and past observers wrote about how seeing the vastness of the Catskill wildlands at once helped them appreciate the importance of protecting it.

Within a few years, the campaign had gotten all five remaining Catskill fire towers listed on the Forest Fire Lookout Association's Historic Lookout Register and later the NRHP. State grants matched by money raised through local efforts such as bake sales, dances, fundraising drives, raffling of a quilt and T-shirt sales raised enough money to begin restoring the tower and cabin in 1998. Volunteers from the New York–New Jersey Trail Conference extended the path from the tower to the spring into a trail that would remain within state land down the mountain's never-logged northwestern slope to a new trailhead, avoiding the closed road. When all these efforts were complete, in 2000, the Red Hill tower became the first of the restored Catskill fire towers to be reopened to the public.

== The tower today ==
The tower is located within a discontiguous parcel of the Sundown Wild Forest management unit. The old road still exists, but is now closed even to state use. Access is via the trail, which begins on Dinch Road, an old, rocky dirt road that winds down around the mountain's northwest slope towards the East Branch of the Neversink River. The trail follows yellow plastic markers 1.5 miles (2.4 km) and vertically 890 feet (271 m) up to the tower. Along the way are 10 numbered wooden signs corresponding to listings in an interpretive brochure created by the Red Hill Fire Tower Committee, available at the trail register. They identify plant species found in the area of the markers, many common to Catskill forests.

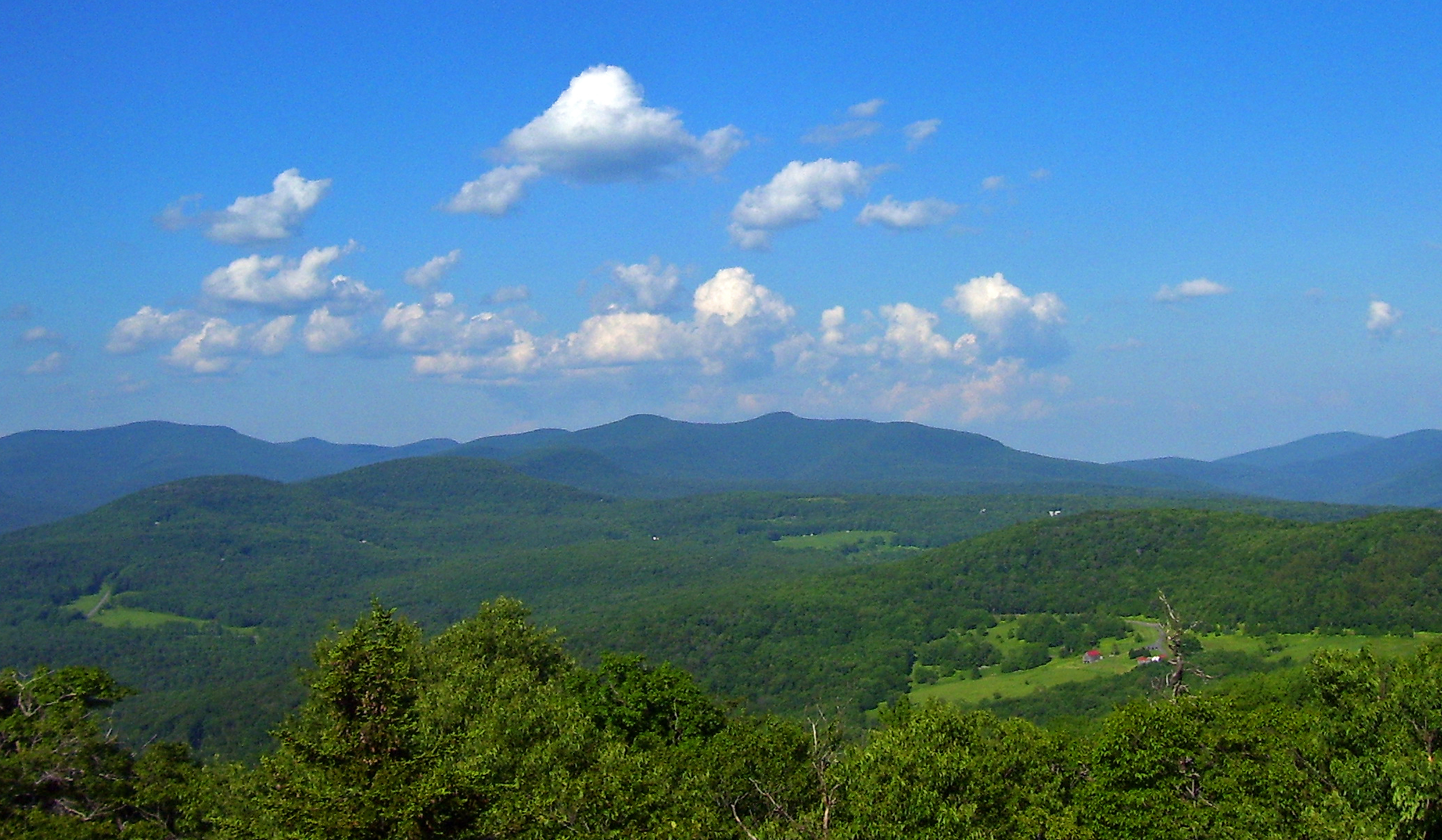
View north from tower

At the summit, volunteer guides man the tower on weekends with good weather between late June and early October every year. There are guides available to bring visitors to the cab of the Firetower on holiday weekends, including Columbus Day. The cab is equipped with paper cutouts identifying the mountains and other landmarks visible within the 50-mile (80 km) area of the tower on clear days. This 360-degree panorama is dominated by Peekamoose and Table mountains, southernmost of the Catskill High Peaks, and other features of the Slide Mountain Wilderness Area to the north. To the southeast the view takes in the Shawangunk Ridge and the Hudson Valley beyond. It is possible to see the river itself, as well as New Jersey's highest mountain, High Point, when visibility is at its maximum. The southwest horizon is in Northeastern Pennsylvania's Poconos, the southern extension of the Catskills. Elk Mountain, the highest in Pennsylvania outside of the Alleghenies, can be seen.

The cabin is also open. It is used as an informal museum of fire protection in the Catskills, with wall displays showing how that was accomplished and artifacts within the cabin showing how observers lived. The porch and picnic tables are available for use. Since the summit is below 3,500 feet (1,067 m) in elevation, camping is permitted year-round.

== See also ==
- Catskill Mountain fire towers
