= Wakely Mountain Fire Observation Station =

- U.S. National Register of Historic Places
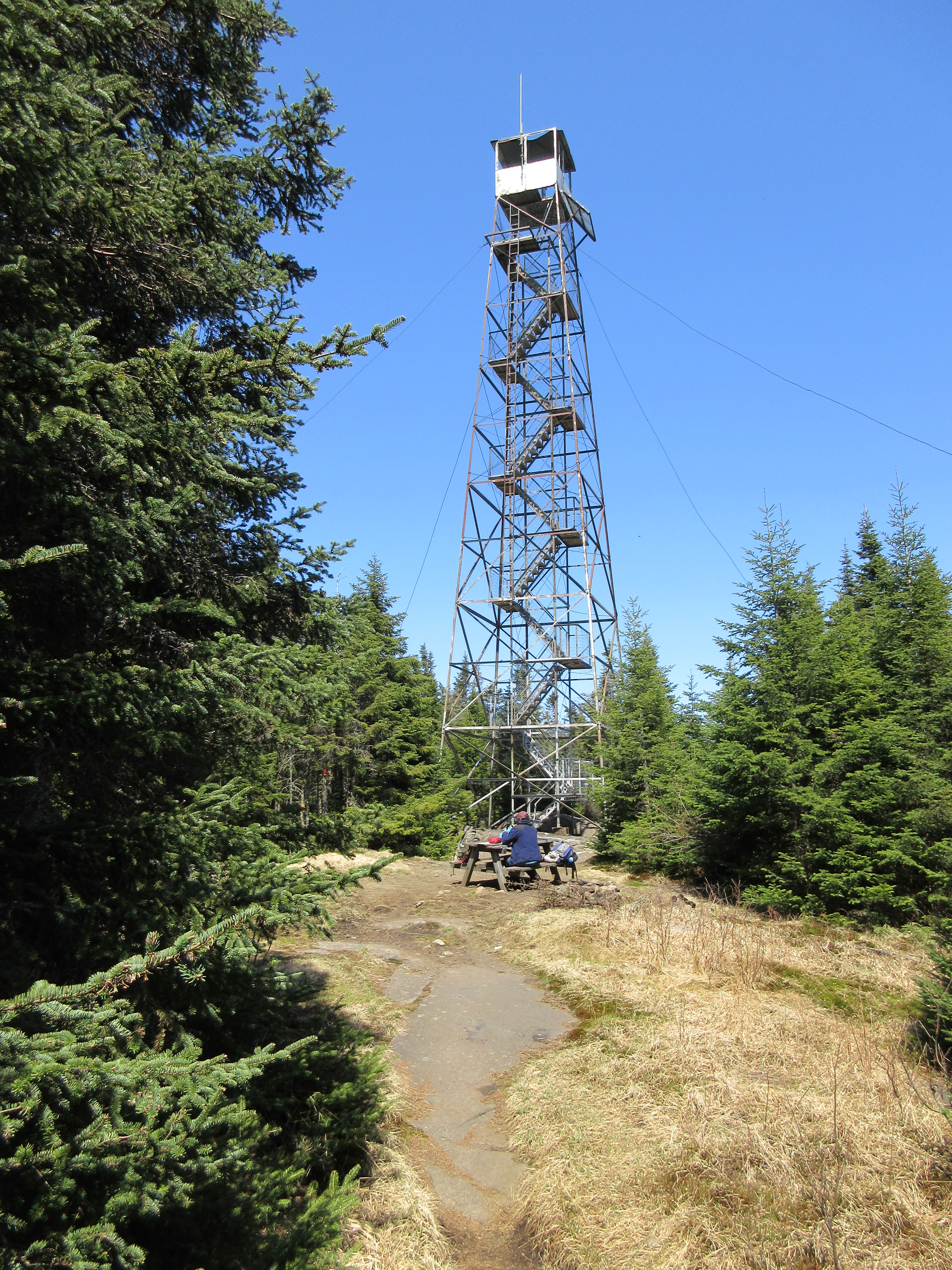

- Location within New York Location within the United States
- Location: Wakely Mountain, Lake Pleasant, New York
- Coordinates: 43°43′50″N 74°28′25″W
- Area: 11 acres (4.5 ha)
- Built: 1916
- Architect: Aermotor Corporation
- MPS: Fire Observation Stations of New York State Forest Preserve MPS
- NRHP reference No.: 03000998
- Added to NRHP: October 3, 2003

The Wakely Mountain Fire Observation Station is a historic fire observation station located on Wakely Mountain at Lake Pleasant in Hamilton County, New York. The station and contributing resources include a 70-foot-tall (21 m), steel-frame lookout tower erected in 1916 and a 3-mile (4.8 km) foot trail that leads down the mountain. The tower is a prefabricated structure built by the Aermotor Corporation. It is one of the initial ten towers purchased by the State Commission to provide a front line of defense in preserving the Adirondack Forest Preserve from the hazards of forest fires.

It was added to the National Register of Historic Places in 2003.
