= Hunter Mountain Fire Tower =

Historic fire lookout tower in New York, United States

- U.S. National Register of Historic Places
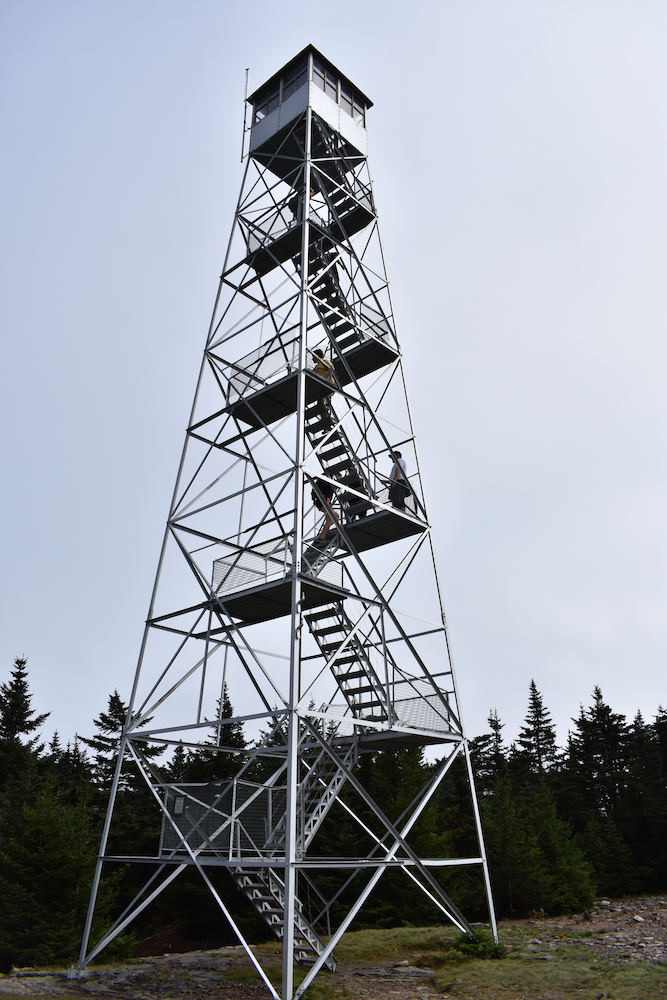
- Tower in 2018
- Location: Summit of Hunter Mountain, Town of Hunter, NY
- Nearest city: Kingston
- Coordinates: 42°10′40″N 74°13′49″W
- Built: 1917
- Architect: Aermotor
- MPS: Fire Observation Stations of New York State Forest Preserve MPS
- NRHP reference No.: 97000569
- Added to NRHP: 1997

The Hunter Mountain Fire Tower is located on the summit of the eponymous mountain, second highest of the Catskill Mountains in the U.S. state of New York. It was the first of 23 fire lookout towers built by the state in the region, and the next-to-last of the five still standing to be abandoned.

Today it remains a popular attraction for hikers climbing the mountain. After it fell into disrepair in the 1990s and was recommended for removal by the New York State Department of Environmental Conservation (DEC), which had operated the tower, it was added to the National Register of Historic Places in 1997. Local enthusiasts were able to raise money, matched by DEC, to restore the tower and adjacent observer's cabin to serve as a museum, with volunteers in the cab on some weekends.

Panoramic views of not only the mountains but the adjacent Hudson Valley, Massachusetts, Connecticut and sometimes southwestern Vermont are available from it. Likewise, it can be seen from many of the surrounding mountains, the village of Hunter and the upper slopes of the ski area. It is the highest fire tower still standing in the state and the second-highest in the entire Northeast.

== History ==
=== Catskill fire protection before towers ===
When the state's Forest Preserve was created in 1885, one of the state's earliest missions was the control and suppression of forest fires which had long ravaged the land and damaged local crops and property. Wardens were hired to patrol railroad lines, where stray ashes from steam engines often ignited surrounding brush, and investigate reports of fires started by logging or quarrying operations on state land (illegal under the legislation that created the Forest Preserve, now Article 14 of the state constitution).

But the Forest, Fish and Game Commission, DEC's predecessor, was hopelessly understaffed and could not even begin to focus on fire prevention. Severe fires during droughts in 1903 and 1908 caused thousands of dollars in damages and led to public calls for better fire control efforts. In December of the latter year, James Whipple, head of the state's Forest, Fish and Game Commission (FFGC, a predecessor agency of DEC), began looking into what could be done. His counterpart in Maine, E.E. Ring, wrote back to one of his inquiries highly recommending the use of strategically placed observation towers similar to the nine his state had already installed. "In my opinion, one man located at a station will do far more effectual work in discovering and locating fires than a hundred men already patrolling," he said.

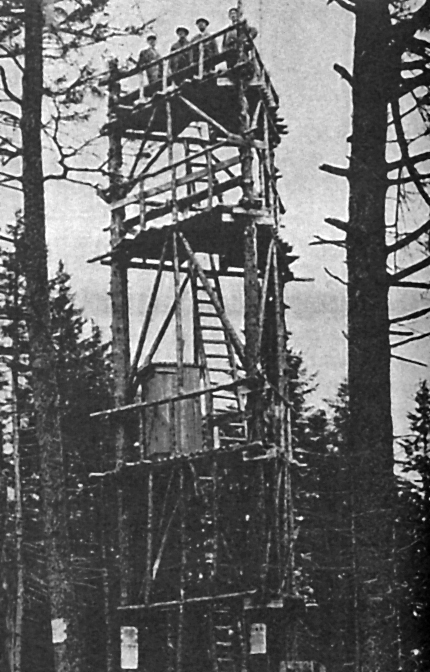
Wooden tower installed in 1909

=== Tower construction and relocation ===
The FFGC realized that informal observation towers already in existence on some summits were excellent places to station trained observers, who could see vast portions of the range and report the location of new fires quickly via dedicated telephone lines. The area around Hunter had historically been very fire-prone, due to heavy logging (less than one square mile or 2.6 square kilometres of virgin forest remains on the mountain) and lightning strikes. The following year, forest rangers built the first Hunter Mountain fire tower, a 40-foot (12.2 m) structure made from three trees, on level ground near the summit. It was one of the first fire lookout towers in the Catskills. Observers stood on an open platform and at first had to live in a nearby tent, until a cabin was built.

Eight years later it was replaced with a more permanent steel 60-foot (18.3 m) tower, the current structure, by what was then the Conservation Commission. It was hauled in sections up the dirt road from Spruceton (now the Spruceton Trail) with a team of horses. At the top was an enclosed cab complete with a map, field glasses and the telephone.

In 1953, it and the cabin were moved one thousand feet (305 m) northwest along the ridge to the mountain's true summit, where it remains today (footings of the original tower are still visible at the trail junction where it stood). At an elevation of 4,040 feet (1,231 m) above sea level it is the highest fire tower in the state and second-highest in the entire Northeast after 4,088-foot (1,246 m) Avery Peak on Maine's Mount Bigelow.

=== Abandonment and revival ===
Observations continued, but fire danger declined over the years along with the industries that had caused many early fires. Airplane flights supplemented the work of the observers, and the public showed greater vigilance in reporting new blazes. DEC finally closed the tower in 1989.

It remained open and accessible to the hiking public, however. In the 1990s, a DEC forester's recommendation in a draft planning document that another of the remaining firetowers be dismantled and removed as a nonconforming structure triggered (as he had hoped) a movement to save them. DEC's guidelines governing the use of the Forest Preserve do allow the retention of otherwise incompatible structures within it if they enhance the public's understanding of the Forest Preserve, and many visitors and past observers wrote about how seeing the vastness of the Catskill wildlands at once helped them appreciate the importance of protecting it.

In 1996, Hunter and the other four towers were added to the Historic Lookout Register, and then to the National Register the following year. Local committees raised money for their repair, and on October 7, 2000 DEC formally reopened the Hunter tower to the public as observation towers with interpretive materials, including an alidade in the tower cab.

Two decades later, DEC initiated a $48,000 renovation program. The roof, which had been damaged by wind during the winter of 2016–17, was replaced along with the grates around the tower landings, the tower repainted, and the windows in the cab repaired. A celebration was held in August 2017 to mark the tower's 100th anniversary.

== Site ==
The tower is located near the center of the small clearing left by early 20th-century logging operations. It is surrounded on all sides by tall balsam fir and red spruce, the dominant tree species in the boreal forest found at high elevations in the Catskills. The observer's cabin, with a small protected porch, is just to the southeast. Its windows are covered in steel mesh to protect it from porcupines, abundant in the Catskill forests, which chew on the wood.

There have been other structures at the site. One observer's son recalls that the state built his father a garage to protect his truck from the porcupines. Catskill forest historian Michael Kudish reports that a small shed near the cabin was removed in the early to mid-1990s.

As part of the renovations, DEC installed a pit privy in the nearby woods. Later that decade it improved the Spruceton Trail to better allow the equestrian use it already permitted. It added a hitching rack, drinking barrel and mounting chute at the summit near the tower, corresponding with similar facilities elsewhere along the trail and at the trailhead.

=== Access ===
The old truck road, now the blue-blazed Spruceton Trail, is the most common route to the tower. Horses and riders may use it, and it can be traveled in the winter with snowshoes or cross-country skis. Most visitors come from the west, 2.7 miles (4.3 km) away, where it leaves Spruceton Road and climbs vertically more than 2,000 feet (610 m) to the summit. Along the way it picks up traffic from the ski area, which operates its summit chairlift in the summer months, via the Colonel's Chair Trail.

A short yellow-blazed spur from the steep Becker Hollow Trail comes in from the north as well, but it is infrequently used. From the east, at Stony Clove Notch, the Devil's Path climbs to the junction with another short trail, the Hunter Mountain Trail, which in turn climbs to the junction with the Spruceton and Becker Hollow trails at the pre-1953 tower site.

The area has long been part of the Hunter Mountain Wild Forest, a New York-specific class of protected area that allows for slightly higher-impact recreational uses than wilderness. Recent proposed changes to the Catskill State Land Master Plan would keep the Spruceton Trail within a small wild forest corridor while merging much of the remaining land with the nearby West Kill Wilderness Area, in order to allow for other possible uses of the trail, such as mountain biking.

=== View ===
External image
- 360 degree view from the Hunter Mountain Fire Tower

Hunter, like many other Catskill peaks, has a wide flat summit covered with forest. Since the entire Catskill range is below tree-line, 360-degree views are extremely rare. The only ones available are from the fire towers.

Due to Hunter's dominance of the northern Catskills, many of the peaks in that region can be seen. The distinctive comb of the Blackhead Range, the third through fifth highest Catskill peaks, can be seen to the north, and to the northeast Kaaterskill High Peak adds another of the Catskills' most recognizable shapes. Less recognizable from this angle are the Devil's Path peaks to the east.

South of Hunter can be seen officially-unnamed Southwest Hunter, known as a difficult bushwhack due to the difficulty of finding the summit register. The central Catskill peaks around Slide Mountain, the highest Catskill peak, can be seen on reasonably clear days, and closer to Hunter fellow Catskill High Peaks West Kill and Rusk stand out to the southwest and west. The ski area's summit station, chairlift and trails are also visible.

== See also ==
- Catskill Mountain fire towers
- National Register of Historic Places listings in Greene County, New York
