= Lake Mountain Lookout Complex =

Coordinates: 34°09′28″N 109°46′07″W

- U.S. National Register of Historic Places
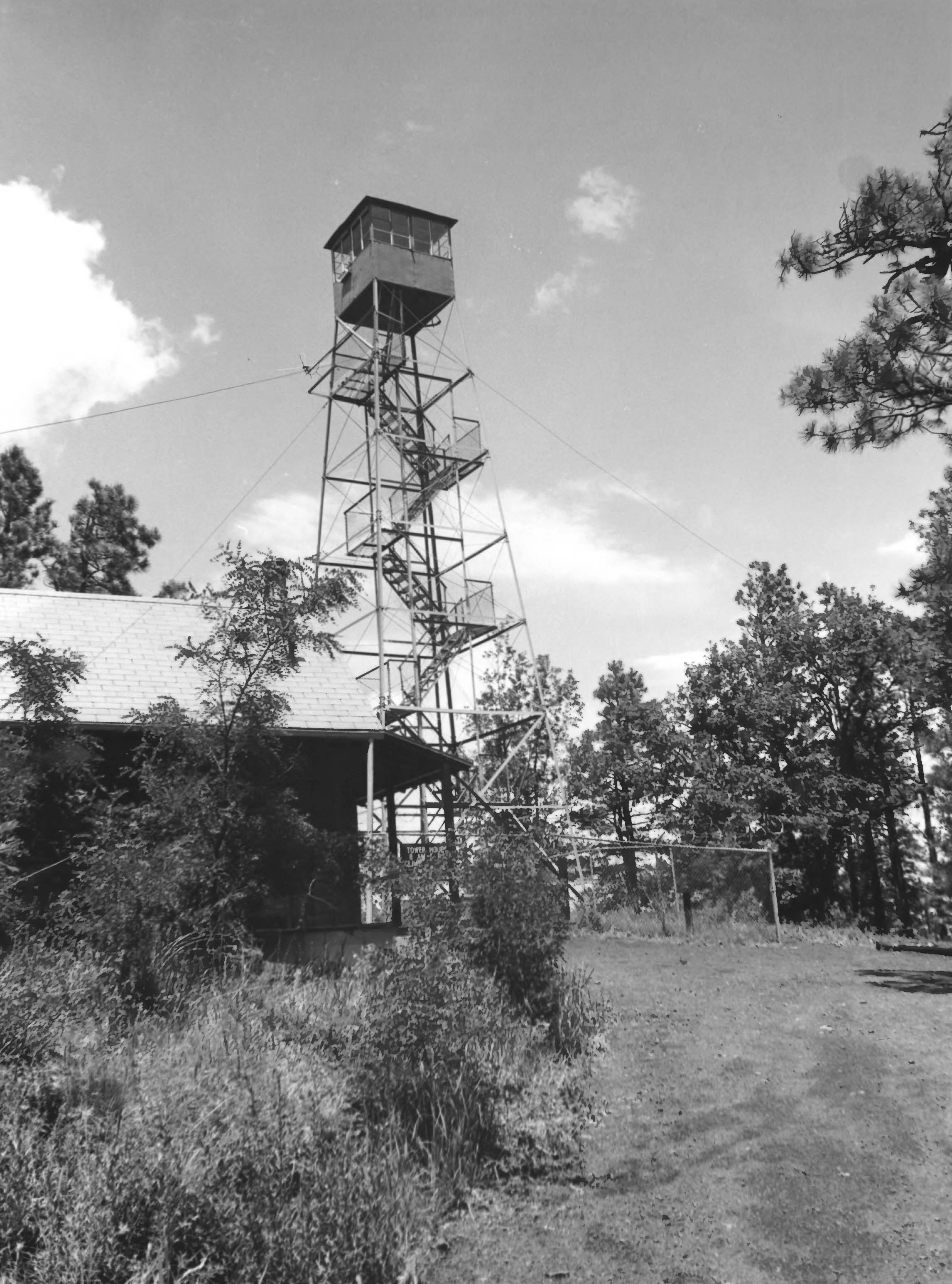
- Lake Mountain Lookout Tower

- Location within Arizona Location within the United States
- Location: McNary, Arizona
- Area: 9 acres (3.6 ha)
- NRHP reference No.: 87002453
- Added to NRHP: January 28, 1988

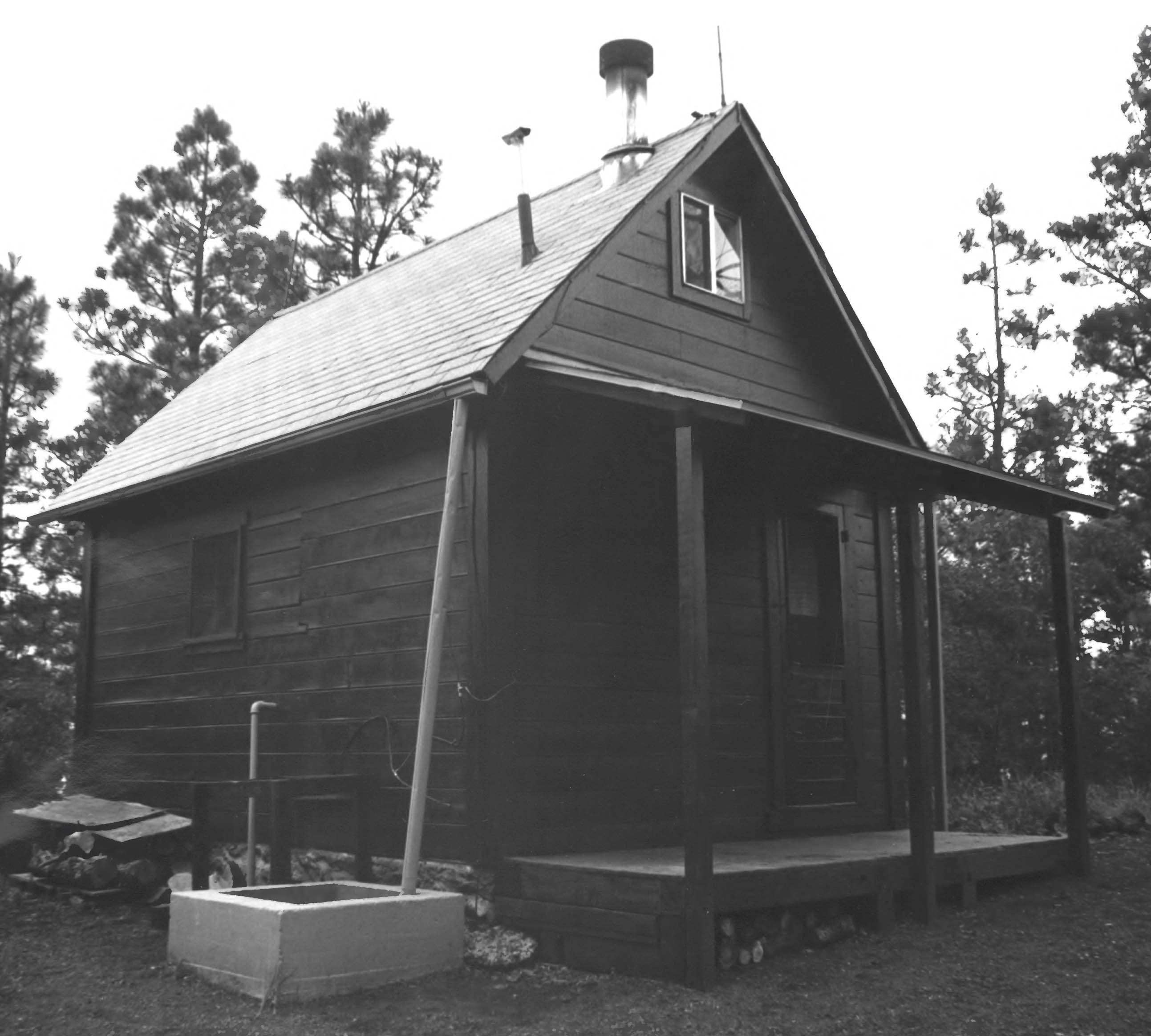
Lake Mountain Lookout Cabin

The Lake Mountain Lookout Complex is a 49-foot tall lookout tower erected in 1926 approximately 20 miles (32 kilometres) east of Lakeside, Arizona. It overlooks a portion of the Apache-Sitgreaves National Forest. The lookout was staffed by a forest ranger who was stationed at the nearby Los Burros Ranger Station, from which they would ride out to the lookout each day. The tower was constructed atop Lake Mountain, at the 8,250 foot elevation, by the Aermotor Windmill Company.

== See also ==
- National Register of Historic Places listings in Apache County, Arizona
