= Thomas O. Perry =

American mechanical engineer and designer (1847–1927)

Thomas Osborne Perry (1847–1927) was an American mechanical engineer, designer, and the original innovator of the all-metal windmill. Perry made significant contributions to the field of wind powered turbines and was an early pioneer of modern wind power technology.

== History ==
Thomas Osborne Perry was born in Franklin, Michigan on February 28, 1847. In 1882 and 1883, while working for the U.S. Wind Engine and Pump Company, Perry conducted a series of over five thousand experiments on windmill rotors and rotor blades. His experiments resulted in a windmill design that was 87% more efficient than other windmills manufactured at that time. Perry's main improvement was the use of concave windmill blades made from steel, rather than flat wooden blades. In order to conduct his experiments, Perry had designed and built an enclosed wind tunnel, a research tool that was not in common use at this time.

In 1888, Thomas Perry and LaVerne Noyes started the Aermotor Windmill Company and began manufacturing Aermotor windmills. The Aermotor was used for pumping water for livestock and became indispensable to midwestern farmers and ranchers in the 19th and early 20th centuries. Selling only 45 windmills in its first year, Aermotor rapidly increased sales and by the turn of the century had sold hundreds of thousands of windmills.

Perry also made many other refinements to windmill designs and published several windmill design patents pertaining to maintainability and efficiency.

Perry died on January 25, 1927, in Oak Park, Illinois, and was interred in Tecumseh, Michigan.
