= Buttermilk Falls =

Buttermilk Falls may refer to:

== Canada ==
- Buttermilk Falls (Ontario)
- Buttermilk Falls, Ontario, a hamlet in Algonquin Highlands, Ontario

== United States ==
- Buttermilk Falls (Bridgewater Township, New Jersey)
- Buttermilk Falls (Mendham Township, New Jersey)
- Buttermilk Falls (Walpack Township, New Jersey)
- Buttermilk Falls State Park, in Ithaca, New York
- Buttermilk Falls (Montgomery County, New York)
- Buttermilk Falls (Otsego County, New York)
- Buttermilk Falls (North Carolina)
- Buttermilk Falls, a waterfall in Mayfield, Ohio, in the North Chagrin reservation of the Cleveland Metroparks
- Buttermilk Falls Natural Area, in Indiana County, Pennsylvania
- Buttermilk Falls, a waterfall in Homewood, Pennsylvania
- Buttermilk Falls, a community in Ligonier Township, Westmoreland County, Pennsylvania
