= Los Burros Ranger Station =

- U.S. National Register of Historic Places
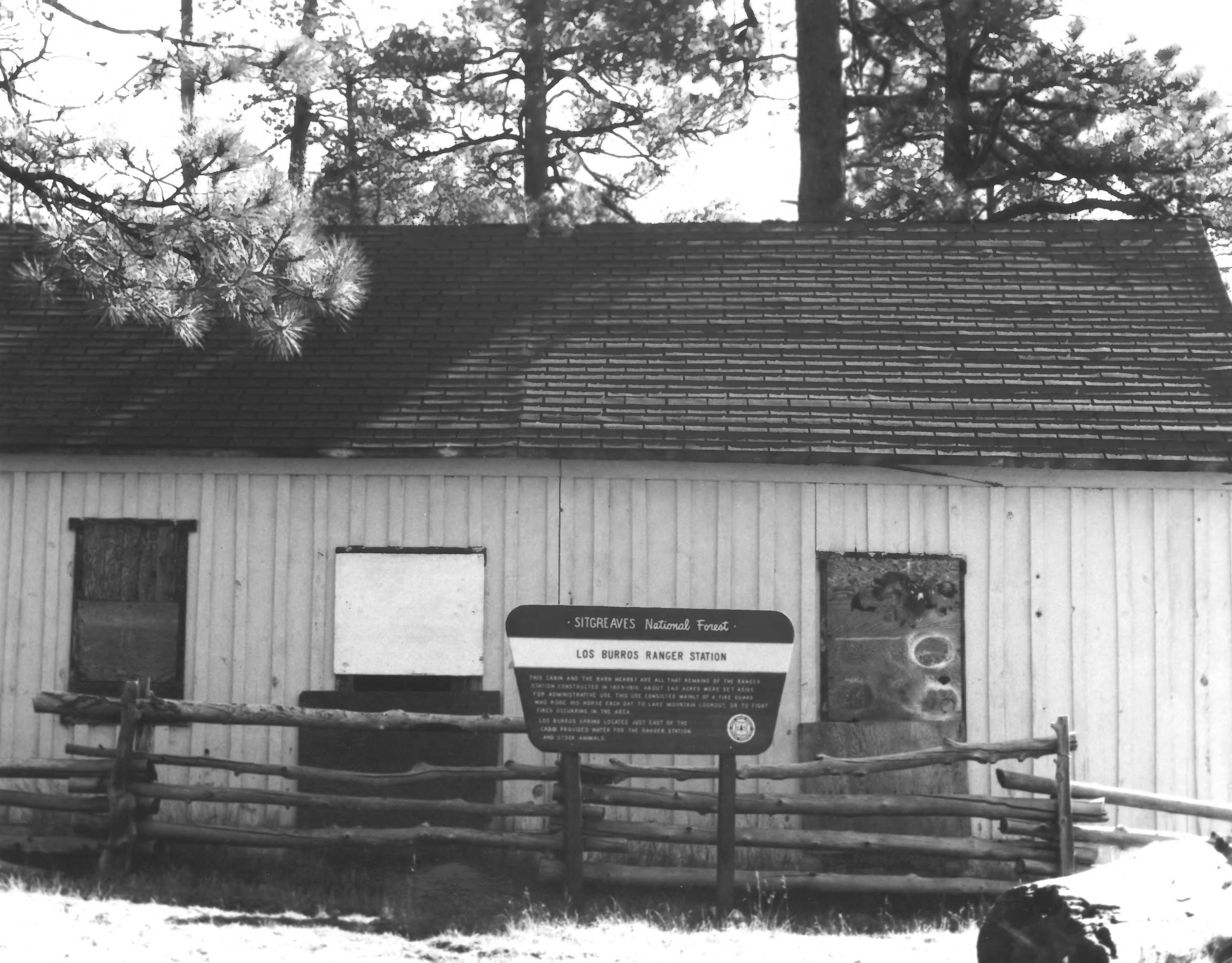
- Office/Living Quarters

- Location within Arizona Location within the United States
- Location: McNary, Arizona
- Coordinates: 34°8′27″N 109°45′55″W
- NRHP reference No.: 86002854
- Added to NRHP: October 23, 1986

The Los Burros Ranger Station is a forest ranger station situated in Apache County, Arizona. The station was staffed by rangers who traveled to the nearby Lake Mountain Lookout.

== History ==
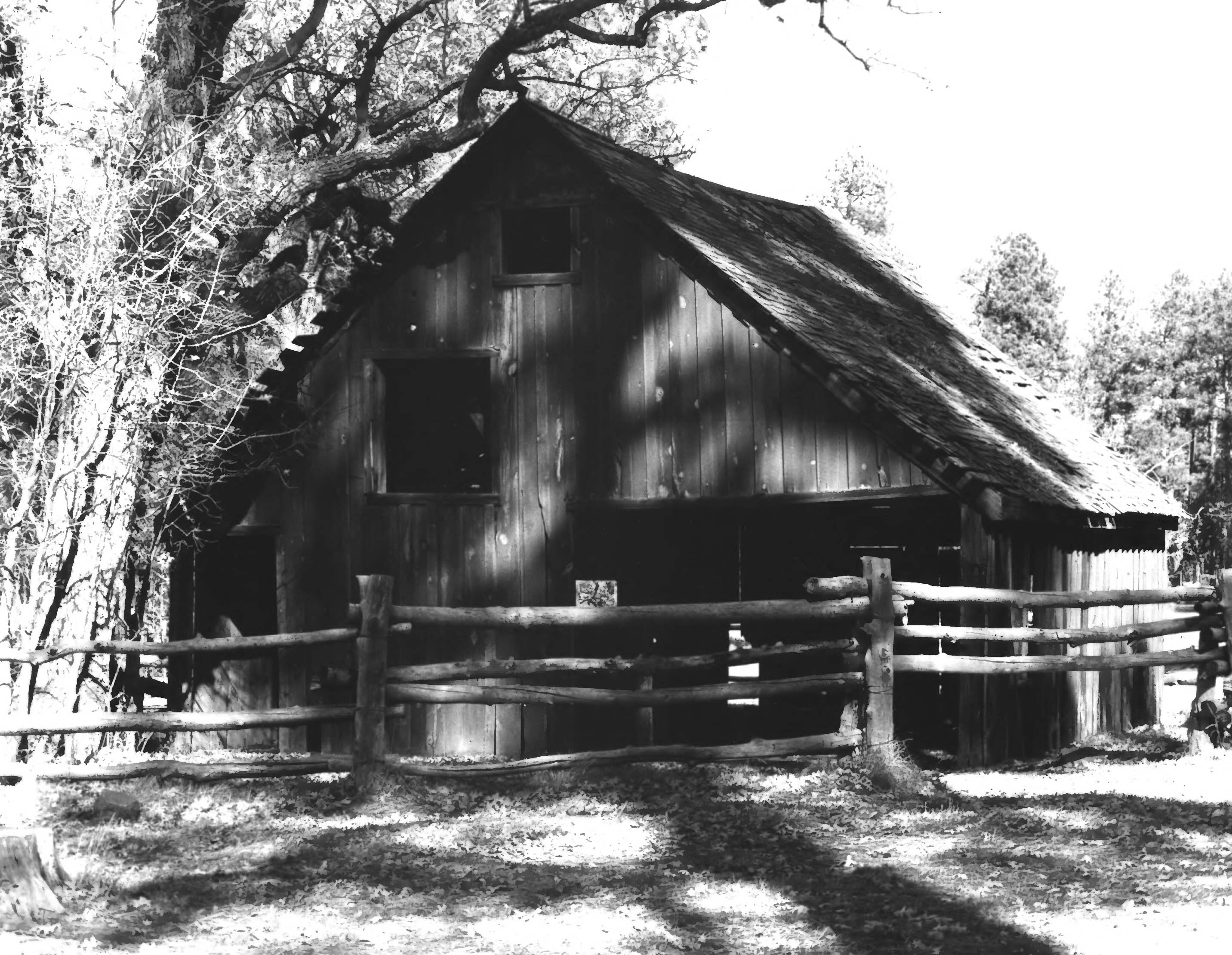
Barn at the Los Burros Ranger Station

The area was most likely named by sheepherders after stray donkeys which used to frequent the area due to the local water supply. Forest Road 224, upon which the station sits, is considered to be the route which was followed by Francisco Vázquez de Coronado on his searches for Cibola. As the Forestry Service began to develop its lookouts in Arizona forests, the men and animals needed to man those lookouts could sometimes be accommodated at local ranches/farms. However the isolation of the Lake Mountain lookout necessitated the construction of structures to see to those needs. The station was constructed in 1909–10, the first to be built in the Lakeside district, on 240 acres east of Pinetop-Lakeside, Arizona. The station was built to house a fireguard, who rode to the nearby Lake Mountain Lookout to watch for forest fires.

The timber industry was very profitable in the region, which has a very high occurrence rate of lightning strikes, so a series of lookouts was created to guard against fires. The fireguard consisted of a combination house-office as well as a nearby barn, both constructed of one inch by twelve inch boards and one inch by four inch battens. With the development of the timber industry in the area, the station was also used as an office for the Forest Service timber sale administrator, which continued for the next 20–30 years. Over the years, the spring, as well as the meadows surrounding the cabin and barn were used by both cowboys and sheepherders driving their herds through the area. The station fell into disuse in the late 1940s or early 1950s.

== Description ==
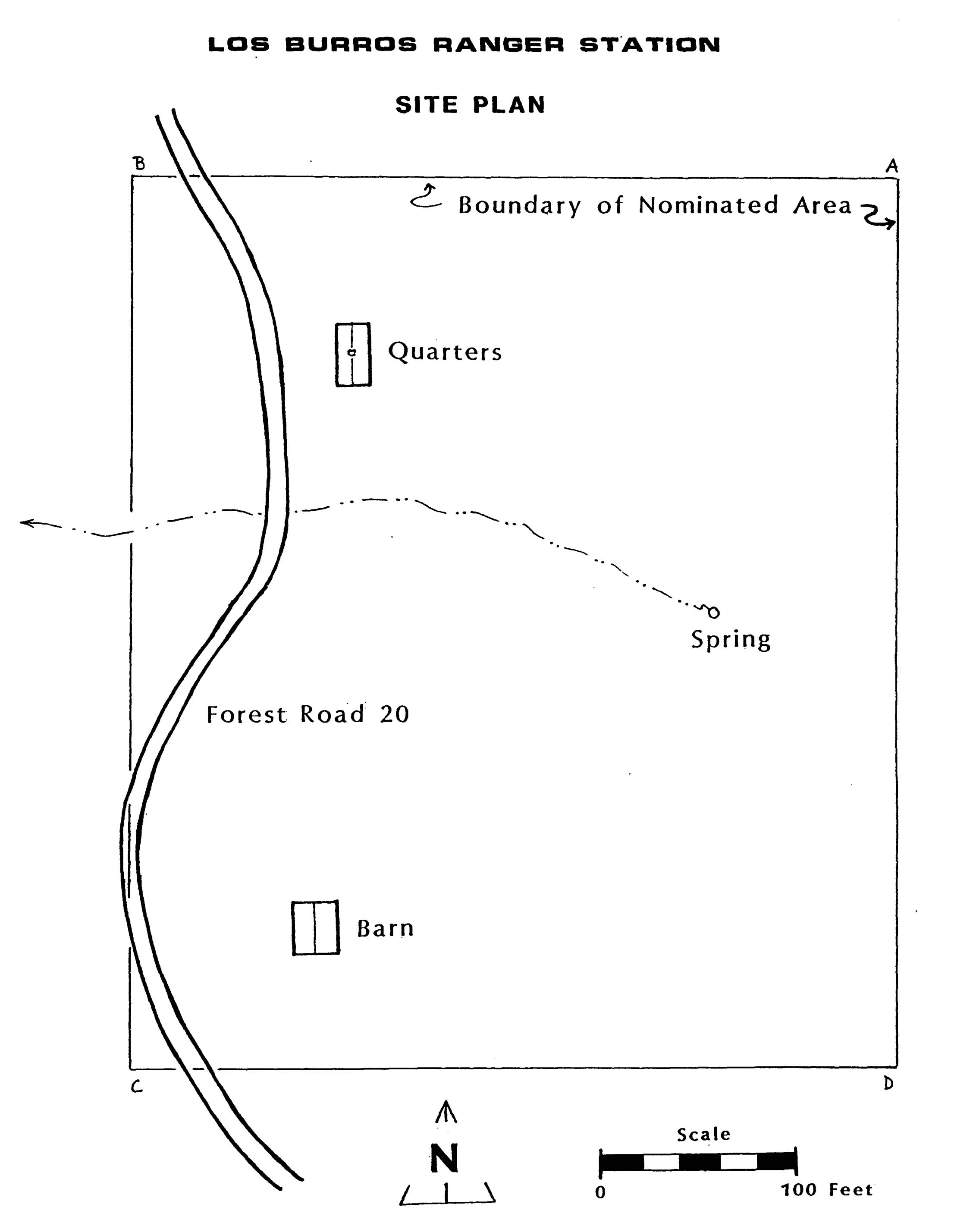
Site plan of the Los Burros Ranger Station

The station is located on Forest Road 224, approximately 8 miles northeast of McNary, Arizona. The site consists of a combination office and living quarters, along with a barn. The 24-acre site also includes the spring and several pastures which were helpful for the stations animals. The office was connected to the main district ranger office 25 miles away in Show Low by a telephone line run from tree to tree on insulators.

The office/living quarters measures 16'4" by 32'10", the western side being the front. The building is split almost equally into two rooms, with a fireplace in the internal wall between them. The slightly larger room has two doors, in the east and west walls directly opposite one another. Both east and west walls also have 1/1 double sash windows, again directly opposite each other. The smaller room has a single door, on the western side, with two /1 double sash windows, on the south and east walls. The roof is of simple gable construction, originally covered with wood shingles, but is now covered with green asphalt shingles.

The barn is several hundred feet south of the office/living quarters. The barn is 24' 3" wide by 26' 7" long, with a steep-pitched gable roof covered in wood shingles. The internal components have not lasted through the years; while there is a loft door on the south end, there is no remaining evidence of the loft itself. The spring lies uphill from the two structures, and has been lined with concrete and capped.

The buildings are the oldest extant structures built by the U.S. Forest Service in the Sitgreaves National Forest. Today, there is a campground named "Los Burros" which exists on the site as well as the ranger office and barn.

== See also ==
- National Register of Historic Places listings in Apache County, Arizona
