= Denning, New York =

- Town
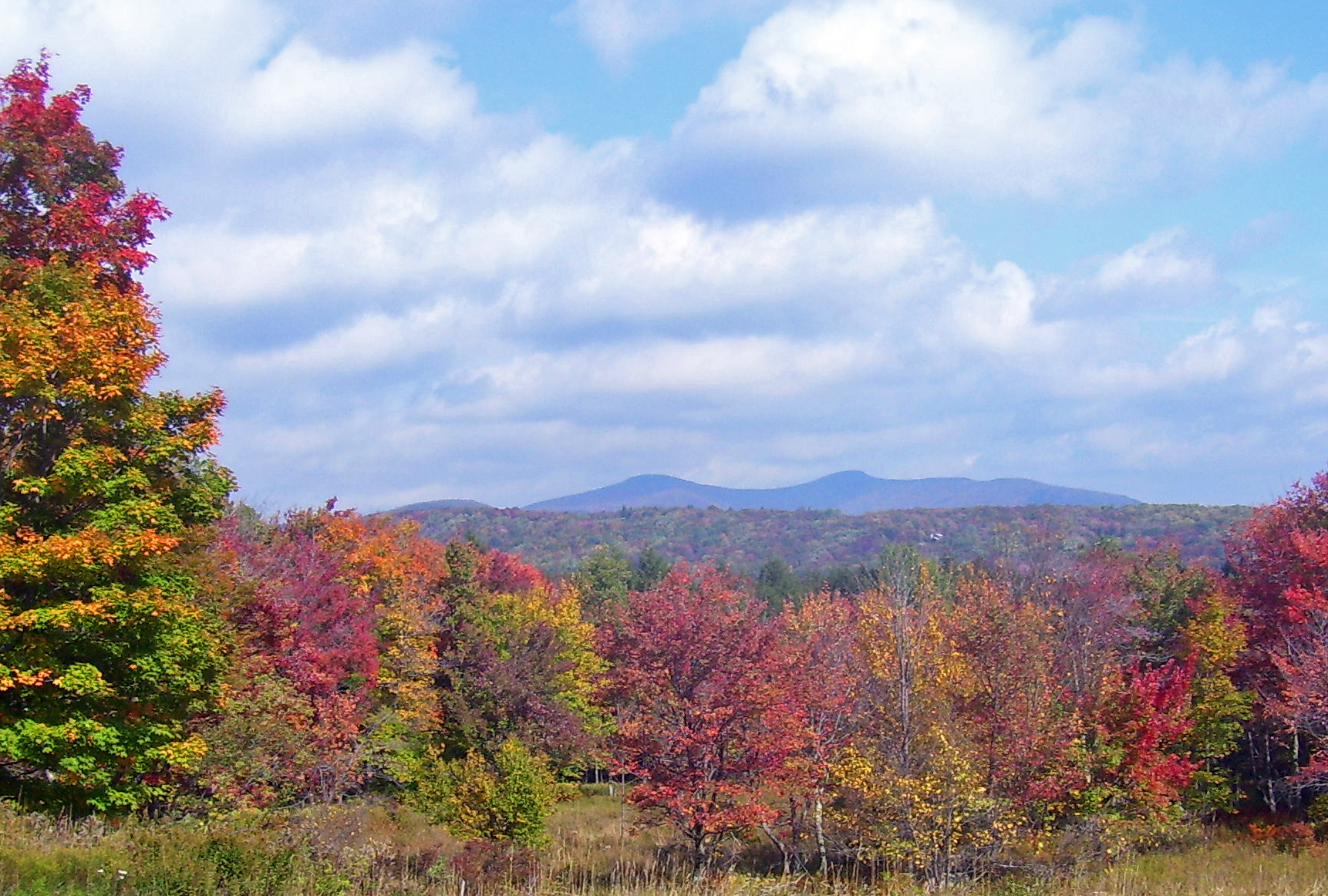
- Table and Peekamoose mountains, the southernmost of the Catskill High Peaks, dominate the view in the town's higher ground.
- Etymology: William Denning, early landowner and settler
- Location of Denning within Ulster County and the state of New York

- Location of New York in the United States
- Coordinates: 41°57′N 74°29′W
- Country: United States
- State: New York
- County: Ulster

Area
  - Total: 105.76 sq mi (273.93 km^{2})
  - Land: 105.66 sq mi (273.67 km^{2})
  - Water: 0.10 sq mi (0.26 km^{2})
- Elevation: 1,960 ft (600 m)
- Highest elevation: 3,847 ft (1,173 m)
- Lowest elevation: 960 ft (290 m)

Population (2020)
  - Total: 493
  - Density: 4.67/sq mi (1.80/km^{2})
- Time zone: UTC-5 (Eastern (EST))
  - Summer (DST): UTC-4 (EDT)
- ZIP Code(s): 12740
- Area code: 845
- FIPS code: 36-111-20247
- FIPS code: 36-20247
- GNIS feature ID: 0978897
- Wikimedia Commons: Denning, New York
- Website: https://www.denningny.gov/

Denning is an isolated town in Ulster County, New York, United States. The population was 493 at the 2020 census. The town is named after an early landowner, William Denning. Denning is located in the western part of the county, deep inside the Catskill Mountains. The location of the town in the Catskill State Park accounts in part for its low population.

== History ==
Denning was established in 1849 from part of the Town of Shandaken. The region had been part of the Hardenburgh Patent granted to Johannes Hardenburgh in 1708. William H. Denning, for whom the settlement was named, bought a tract of land at a tax sale.

The Red Hill Fire Observation Station was listed on the National Register of Historic Places in 2001.

== Geography ==
According to the United States Census Bureau, the town has a total area of 105.3 square miles (273 km^{2}), of which 105.2 square miles (272 km^{2}) is land and 0.1 square miles (0.26 km^{2}) (0.07%) is water.

The town is in the Catskill Mountains and borders Sullivan County, New York. It is rugged and heavily wooded. Most settlement is concentrated around the hamlet of Sundown on Rondout Creek, along the two branches of the Neversink River or in the plateau between the two valleys northeast of Red Hill, at elevations 2,500 feet (762 m) above sea level and higher.

Since the town is entirely within the Catskill Park, large tracts of land are owned by the state Department of Environmental Conservation as part of New York's Forest Preserve. These forests are either in the Sundown Wild Forest in the eastern parts of the town or the Slide Mountain Wilderness Area in its central regions. Within the former are the three southernmost Catskill High Peaks: Peekamoose, Table and Lone mountains. At 3,847 feet (1,173 m), Table's summit is the highest point in the town. Slide Mountain, the highest peak in the Catskills, is north of Denning.

A lower mountain, 2,990-foot (910 m) Red Hill, has a fire tower on its summit popular with hikers. It is the only property in Denning listed on the National Register of Historic Places.

== Demographics ==
Historical population
| Census | Pop. | Note | %± |
|---|---|---|---|
| 1850 | 447 | | — |
| 1860 | 1,073 | | 140.0% |
| 1870 | 1,044 | | −2.7% |
| 1880 | 1,036 | | −0.8% |
| 1890 | 897 | | −13.4% |
| 1900 | 782 | | −12.8% |
| 1910 | 615 | | −21.4% |
| 1920 | 419 | | −31.9% |
| 1930 | 292 | | −30.3% |
| 1940 | 300 | | 2.7% |
| 1950 | 233 | | −22.3% |
| 1960 | 215 | | −7.7% |
| 1970 | 297 | | 38.1% |
| 1980 | 474 | | 59.6% |
| 1990 | 524 | | 10.5% |
| 2000 | 516 | | −1.5% |
| 2010 | 551 | | 6.8% |
| 2020 | 493 | | −10.5% |
U.S. Decennial Census 2020

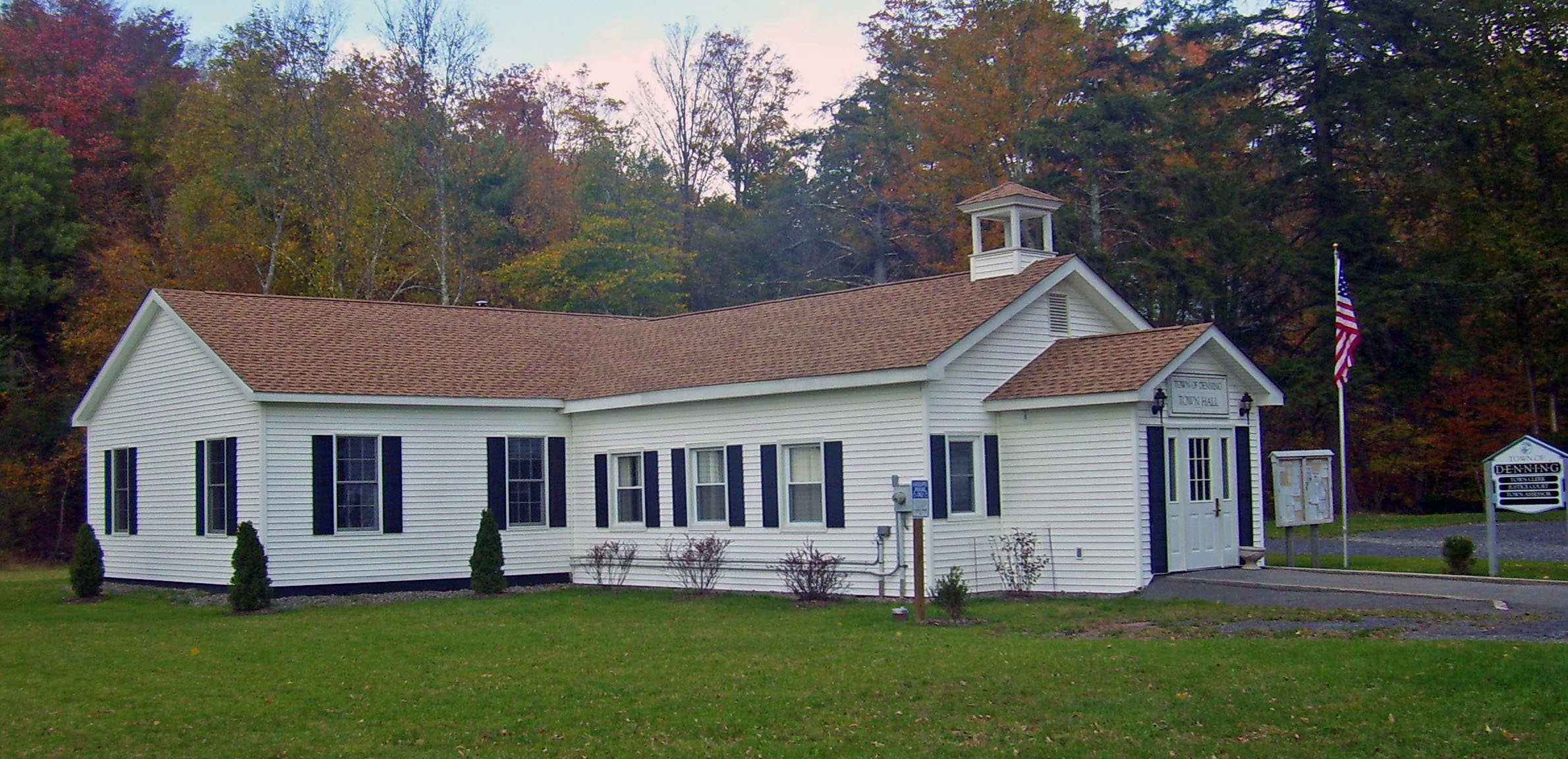
Town hall

As of the census of 2000, there were 516 people, 215 households, and 124 families residing in the town. The population density was 4.9 inhabitants per square mile (1.9/km^{2}). There were 517 housing units at an average density of 4.9 per square mile (1.9/km^{2}). The racial makeup of the town was 95.93% White, 0.97% Native American, 0.19% Asian, and 2.91% from two or more races. Hispanic or Latino of any race were 1.55% of the population.

There were 215 households, out of which 18.1% had children under the age of 18 living with them, 49.8% were married couples living together, 6.0% had a female householder with no husband present, and 41.9% were non-families. 37.2% of all households were made up of individuals, and 13.5% had someone living alone who was 65 years of age or older. The average household size was 2.25 and the average family size was 2.98.

In the town, the population was spread out, with 17.4% under the age of 18, 7.9% from 18 to 24, 28.5% from 25 to 44, 28.7% from 45 to 64, and 17.4% who were 65 years of age or older. The median age was 43 years. For every 100 females, there were 103.1 males. For every 100 females age 18 and over, there were 105.8 males.

The median income for a household in the town was $40,893, and the median income for a family was $50,729. Males had a median income of $37,750 versus $25,179 for females. The per capita income for the town was $23,846. About 5.7% of families and 12.0% of the population were below the poverty line, including 9.3% of those under age 18 and 8.8% of those age 65 or over.

== Communities and locations in Denning ==
- Branch: A hamlet on CR 47, northeast of Frost Valley.
- Bull Run: A hamlet north of Sundown on NY 42. Bull Run- name was changed to "Bullrun"- one word, then Renamed "Peekamose" in 1904 when Paul A. Sheeley was Postmaster
- Denning: The hamlet of Denning is by the East Branch of the Neversink River.
- Frost Valley: A hamlet on CR 47.
- Greenville: A hamlet near the eastern town line on CR 46.
- Ladleton: A hamlet by the East Branch of the Neversink River, southwest of Denning village.
- Peekamose: A hamlet near the eastern town line on NY 42. Peekamose post office was formerly called "Bull Run" then "Bullrun" before changed to Peekamose in 1904.
- Sundown: A hamlet near the southern town line on CR 46.
