= Mountain Fire Lookout Tower =

- Mountain Fire Lookout Station
- U.S. National Register of Historic Places
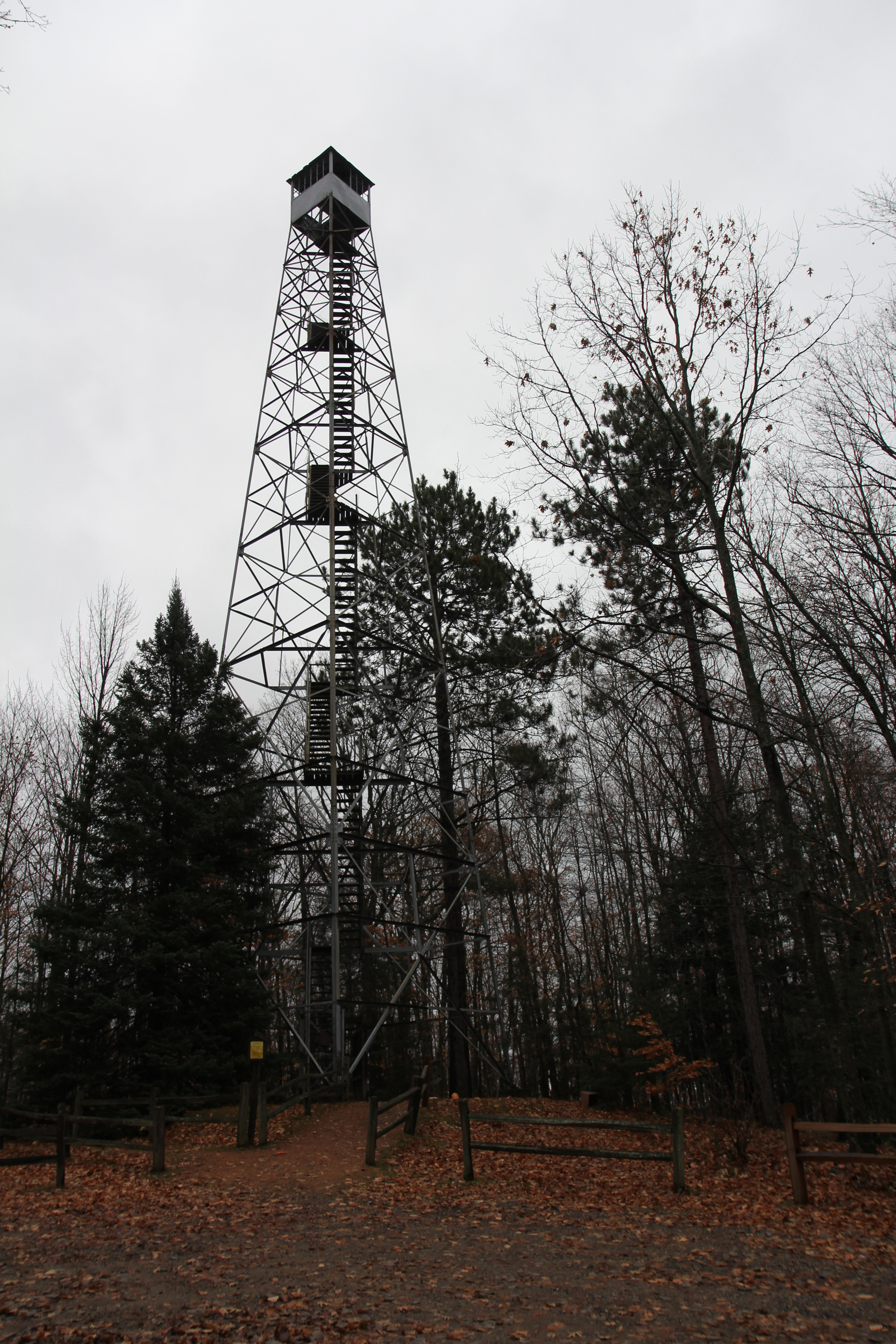
- Tower rising above the treeline

- Location within Wisconsin Location within the United States
- Location: Forest Service Rd. 2335 (Tower Rd.), Lakewood Ranger District, Nicolet National Forest, in Riverview, Wisconsin
- Coordinates: 45°12′49″N 88°27′52″W
- Area: less than one acre
- Built: 1935
- Architect: Aermotor Company
- Architectural style: Fire Lookout station
- NRHP reference No.: 08000790
- Added to NRHP: August 19, 2008

Mountain Fire Lookout Tower is a fire lookout tower in Oconto County, Wisconsin, United States.

It is the eighth property featured in a program of the National Park Service that began in July, 2008.

It is located on Forest Service Rd. 2335 (Tower Rd.), Lakewood Ranger District, Nicolet National Forest, in Riverview, Wisconsin.

It was listed on the National Register of Historic Places on August 19, 2008.
