= Buttermilk Falls Natural Area =

Waterfalls in Clyde, Indiana County, Pennsylvania, United States

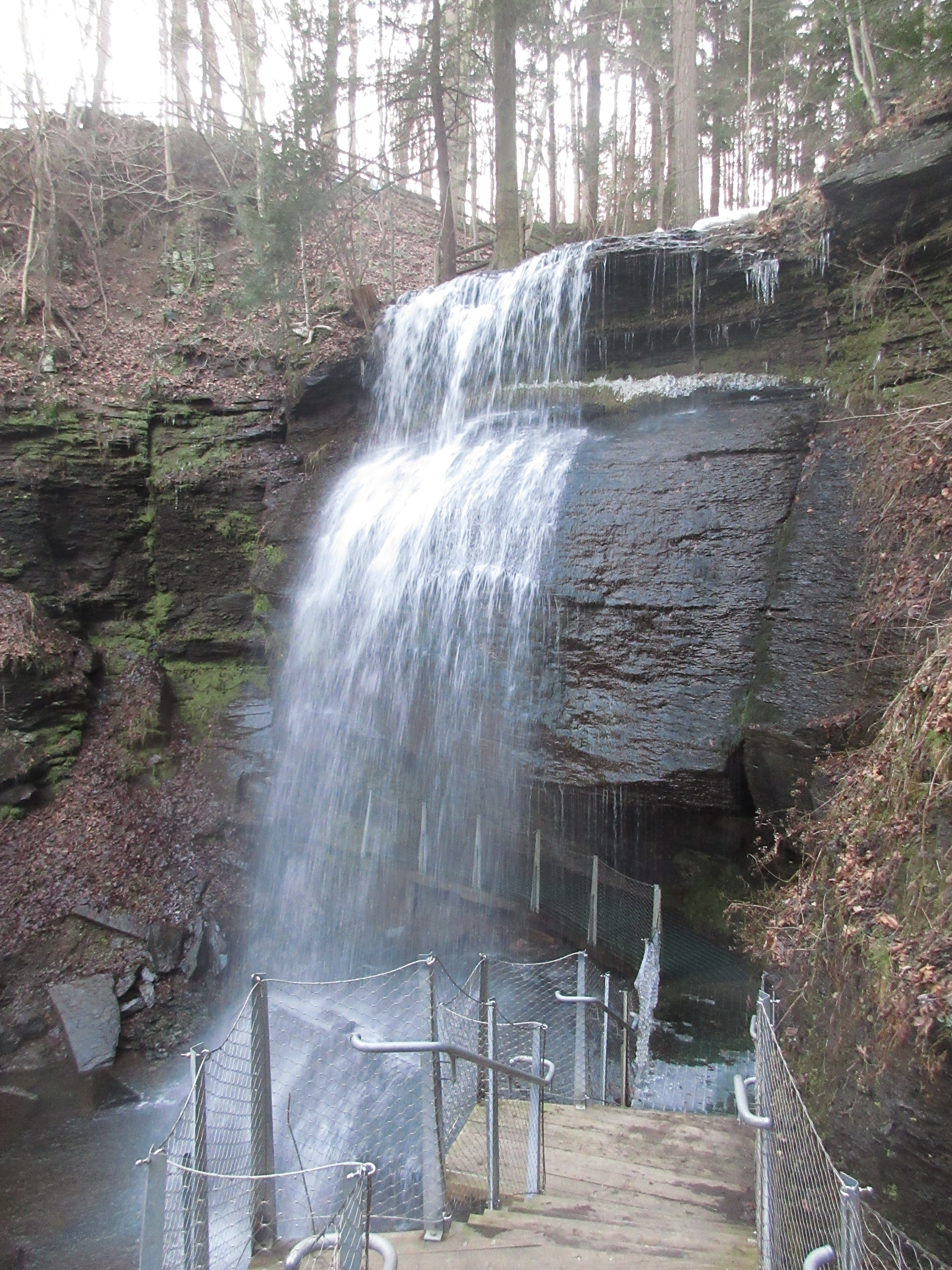

- Location within Pennsylvania
- Location: Indiana County, Pennsylvania, U.S.
- Nearest city: Seward
- Coordinates: 40°25′10″N 79°04′04″W
- Area: 48 acres (19 ha)
- Established: 1995
- Website: www.indianacountyparks.org/parks/bf/bf.html

Buttermilk Falls Natural Area is located in Clyde, Indiana County, Pennsylvania, United States. They are 46 feet (14 m) high. There is also a short trail to a location behind the falls.

The site is also notable for being the home of Fred McFeely from 1931 to 1956. Mr. McFeely, from Latrobe, Pennsylvania was the grandfather of Fred Rogers of "Mister Rogers' Neighborhood" on Public Broadcasting Service (PBS) Public television stations. The stone foundations of their home, stable and swimming area they used as a rural retreat are still visible.

The property is managed by the Indiana County Parks and Trails Department.

== Photo Gallery ==
Buttermilk Falls Natural Area
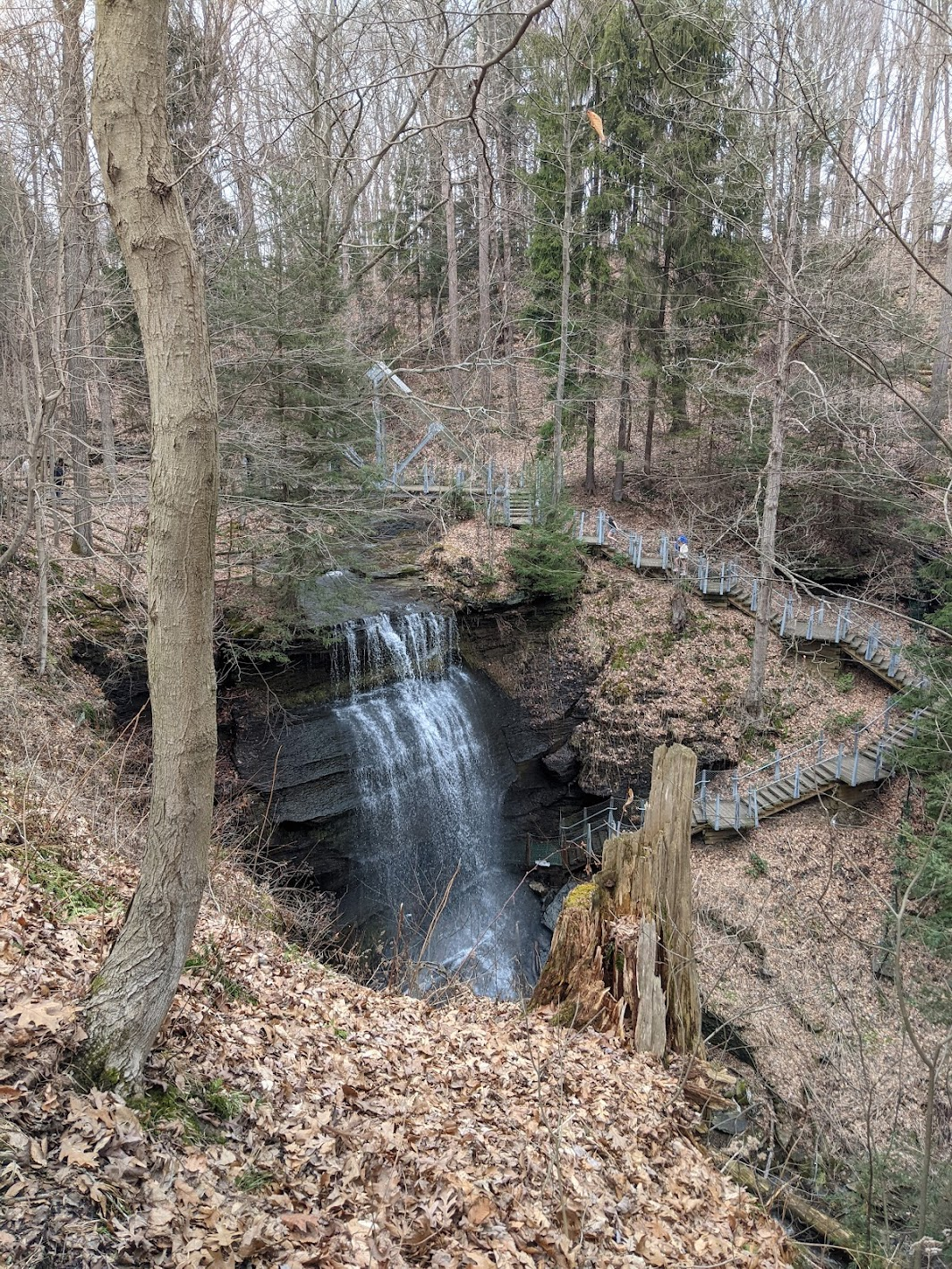
View of Buttermilk Falls and staircase from the southern ridge
