= Hurricane Mountain Fire Observation Station =

- U.S. National Register of Historic Places
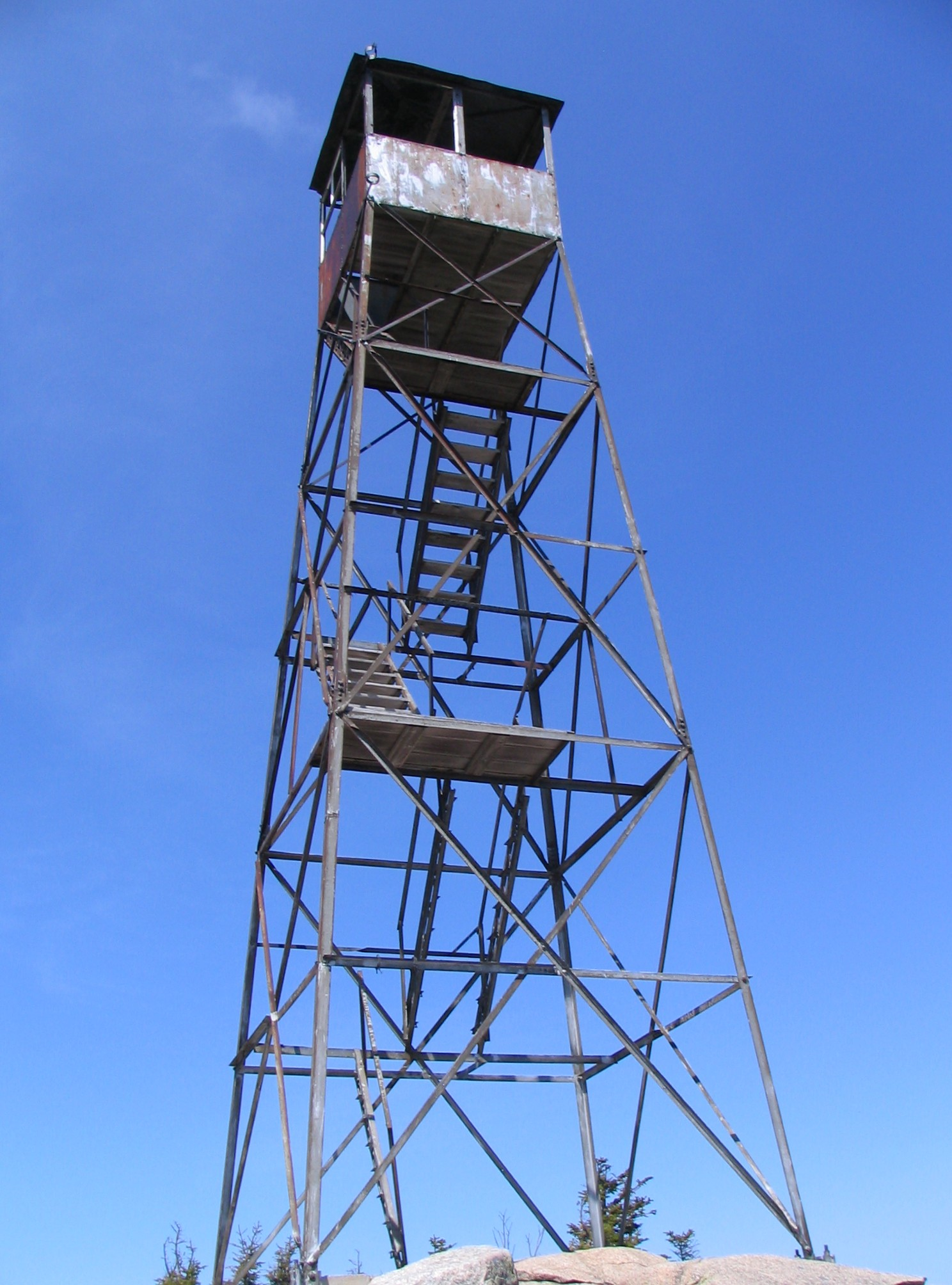
- Hurricane Mountain Fire Observation Station, May 2008

- Location within New York Location within the United States
- Location: Hurricane Mountain Summit, Keene, New York
- Coordinates: 44°14′06″N 73°42′38″W
- Area: 19.3 acres (7.8 ha)
- Built: 1919
- Architect: Aermotor Company
- MPS: Fire Observation Stations of New York State Forest Preserve MPS
- NRHP reference No.: 06001145
- Added to NRHP: January 29, 2007

The Hurricane Mountain Fire Observation Station is a historic fire observation station located on Hurricane Mountain at Keene in Essex County, New York. The station and contributing resources include a 35-foot-tall (10.7 m), steel frame lookout tower erected in 1919, two trails leading up the 3,694-foot (1,126 m) summit, and the ruins of a lean-to style observers cabin. The tower is a prefabricated structure built by the Aermotor Corporation to provide a front line of defense in preserving the Adirondack Park from the hazards of forest fires.

It was added to the National Register of Historic Places in 2007.
