= Mount Tremper Fire Observation Station =

- U.S. National Register of Historic Places
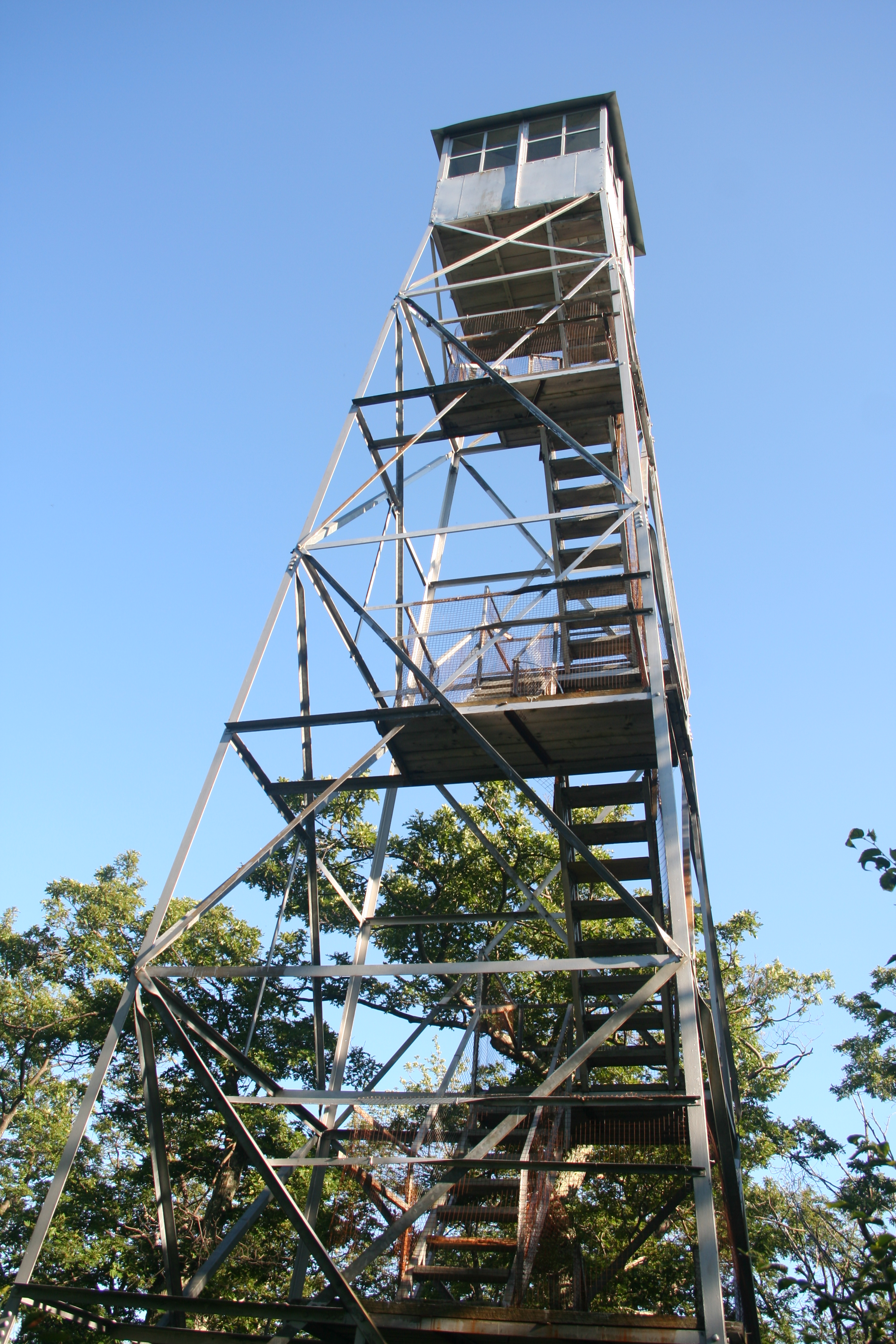
- The Fire Observation Station

- Location within New York Location within the United States
- Location: Mount Tremper, Shandaken, New York
- Coordinates: 41°15′50″N 74°18′36″W
- Area: 9.1 acres (3.7 ha)
- Built: 1917
- Architect: Aermotor Corporation
- MPS: Fire Observation Stations of New York State Forest Preserve MPS
- NRHP reference No.: 01001032
- Added to NRHP: September 23, 2001

The Mount Tremper Fire Observation Station is a historic fire observation station located on Mount Tremper at Shandaken in Ulster County, New York. The station and contributing resources include a 47-foot-tall (14.3 m), steel frame lookout tower erected in 1917 and a jeep trail that extends from the base of the mountain to a point below its summit. The tower is a prefabricated structure built by the Aermotor Corporation to provide a front line of defense in preserving the Catskill Park from the hazards of forest fires.

It was added to the National Register of Historic Places in 2001.

== See also ==
- Catskill Mountain fire towers
- National Register of Historic Places listings in Ulster County, New York
