= Hurricane Mountain =

Mountain in New York, United States

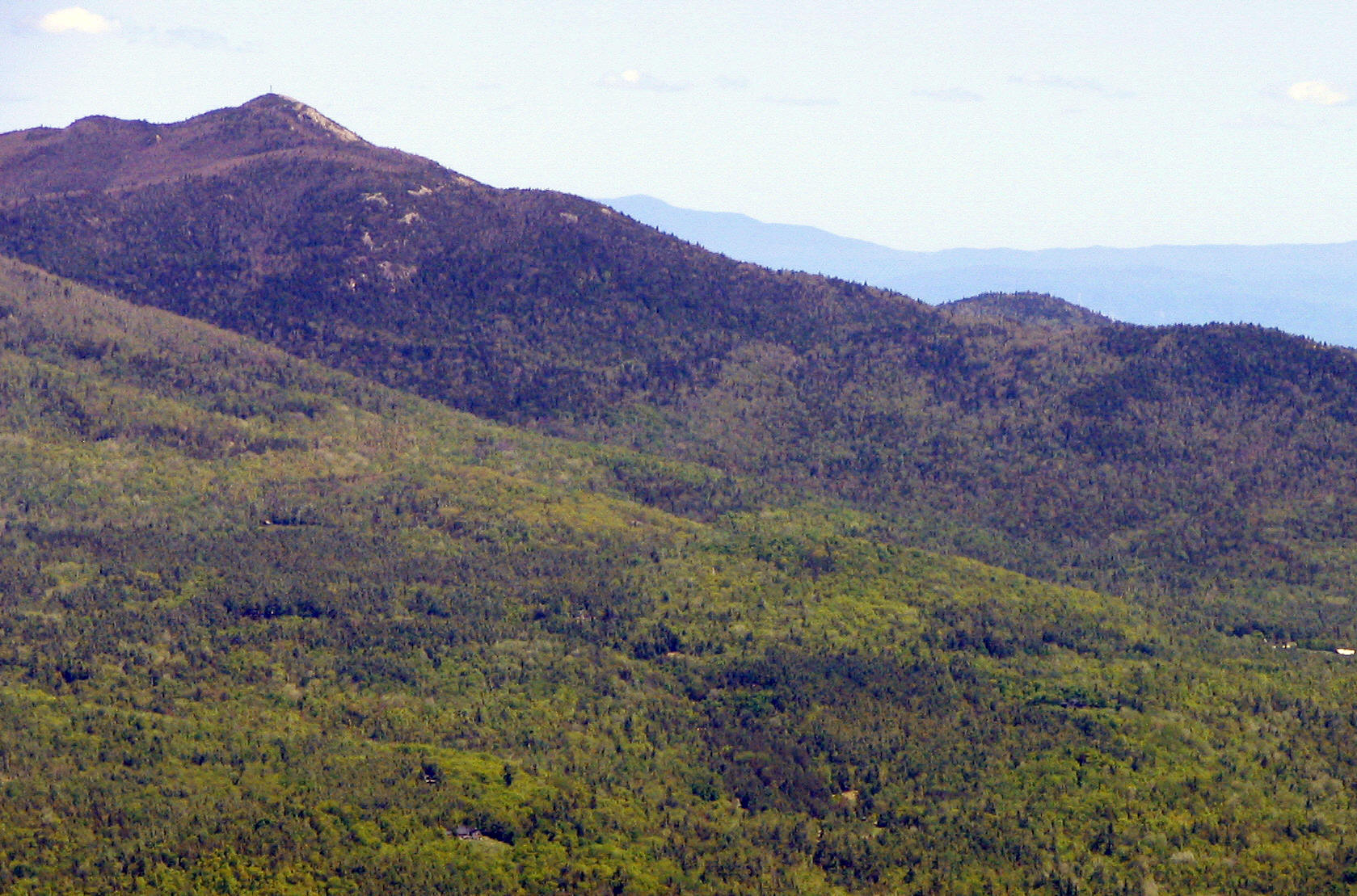
- Hurricane from Pitchoff

Highest point
- Elevation: 3,688 ft (1,124 m)
- Prominence: 1,982 ft (604 m)
- Coordinates: 44°14′07″N 73°42′38″W

Geography
- Location within New York Adirondack Park Location within the United States
- Location: Keene / Elizabethtown, New York, U.S.
- Parent range: Adirondacks
- Topo map: USGS Rocky Peak Ridge

Hurricane Mountain is a 3,688-foot-tall (1,124 m) mountain near Keene in the north of the High Peaks region of the Adirondacks in New York, United States. It is considered to boast some of the most impressive views of any of the lesser peaks; this is due to its prominence, and because its summit was cleared by Verplanck Colvin in the course of his early survey of the Adirondacks. On a clear day, the length of Lake Champlain and the Green Mountains of Vermont are visible to the east, and many of the High Peaks can be seen to the south through the northwest. There is a disused fire tower on the top.

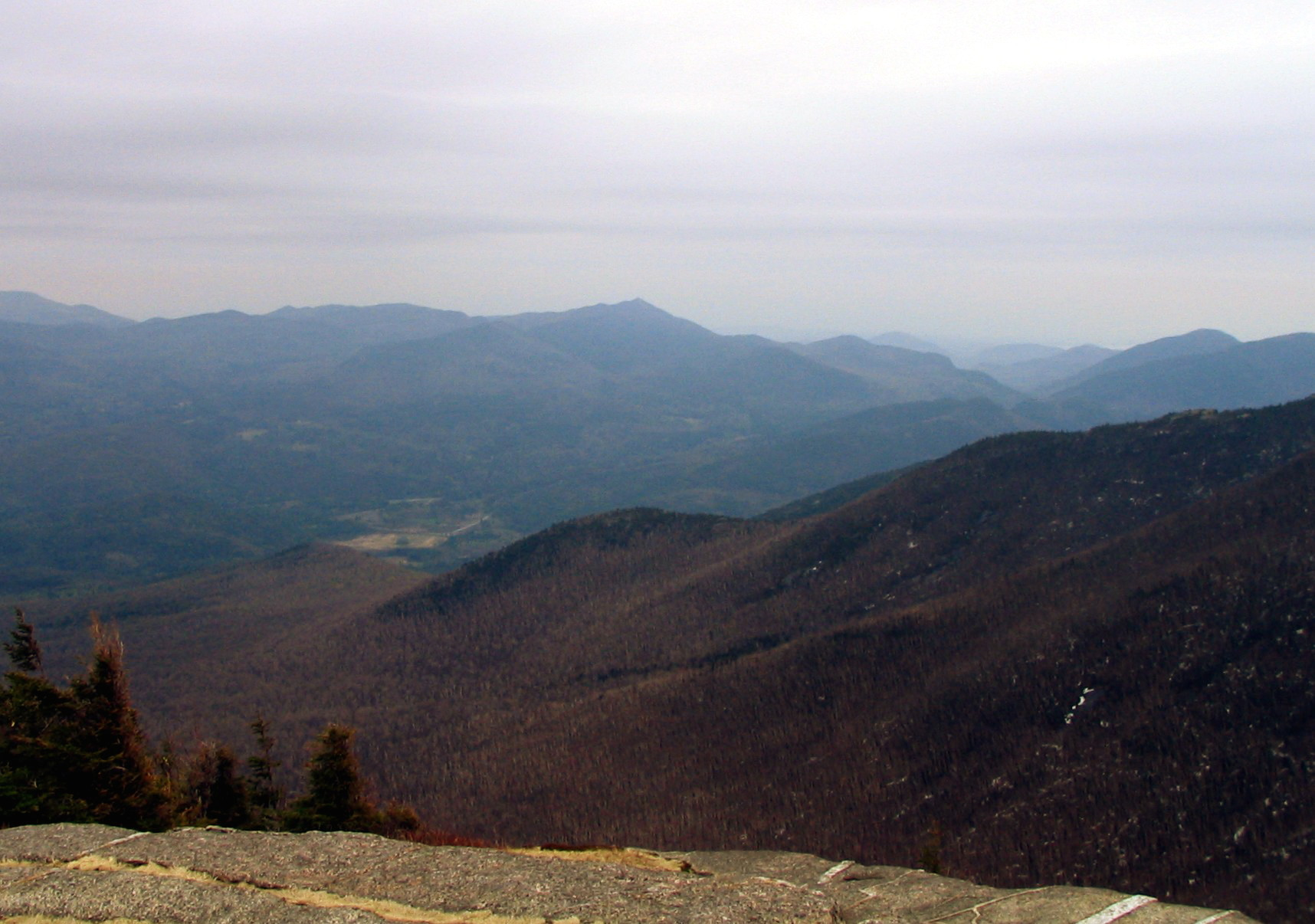
Hurricane from Cascade (on horizon, center)

There are three trails to the summit, from the north (unmaintained), south and east. Atop the mountain is the Hurricane Mountain Fire Observation Station, added to the National Register of Historic Places in 2007.
