= List of crossings of the Neversink River =

This is a list of all the crossings of the Neversink River from its mouth, the Delaware River at Port Jervis, New York, to its source, the confluence of its east and west branches near the hamlet of Claryville

== Crossings ==
Crossing	Carries	Location	Coordinates
	I-84	Port Jervis	41°21′25″N 74°41′38″W
	US 6	Port Jervis	41°21′40″N 74°41′08″W
	Metro-North Port Jervis Line	Port Jervis	41°21′45″N 74°41′03″W
	Orange County 80	Huguenot	41°23′24″N 74°38′04″W
	Guymard Turnpike	Myers Grove	41°26′27″N 74°36′5″W
	US 209	Cuddebackville	41°27′20″N 74°36′03″W
	Paradise Road	Paradise	41°29′53″N 74°38′23″W
	Sullivan County 49 (Oakland Valley Road)	Forestburgh	41°30′16″N 74°38′54″W
	Foot trail	Forestburgh	41°32′38″N 74°38′54″W
	Sullivan County 173 (Bridgeville Road)	Bridgeville	41°38′02″N 74°37′09″W
	NY 17	Bridgeville	41°38′10″N 74°37′07″W
	Grey Road	Thompsonville	41°40′38″N 74°35′55″W
	Sullivan County 52 (Old Falls Road)	Fallsburg	41°43′49″N 74°36′15″W
	NY 42-NY 52	Woodbourne	41°45′35″N 74°36′00″W
	Hasbrouck A Road	Hasbrouck	41°47′16″N 74°36′57″W
	Private road	Neversink	41°48′58″N 74°37′59″W
Neversink Dam	NY 55	Neversink	41°49′27″N 74°38′19″W
	Private covered bridge	Neversink	41°53′24″N 74°35′25″W
	Hunter Road	Neversink	41°53′33″N 74°35′16″W
	Private bridge	Neversink	41°54′07″N 74°34′50″W
