= Grahamsville Historic District =

Historic district in New York, United States

- U.S. National Register of Historic Places
- U.S. Historic district
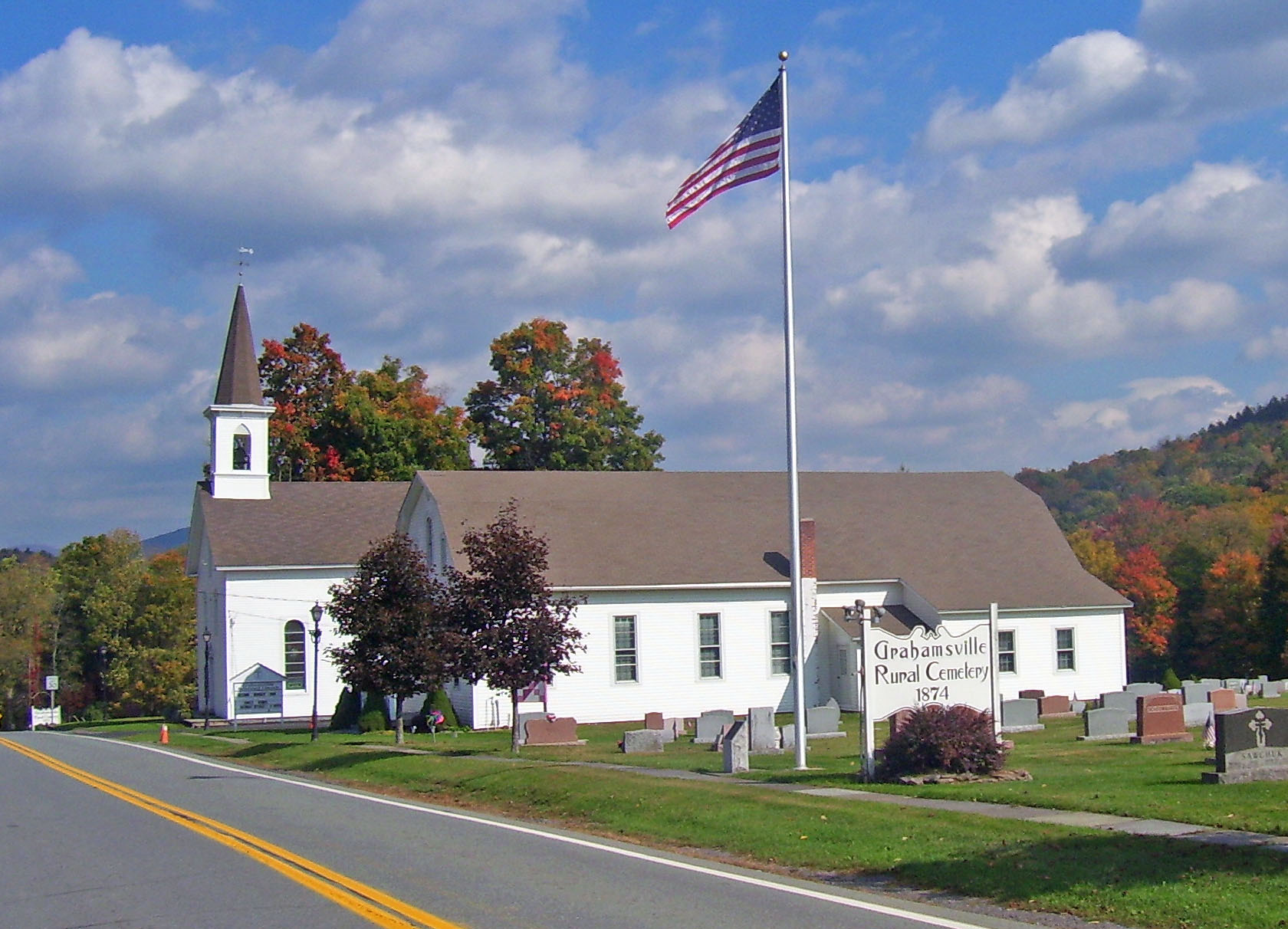
- Grahamsville Reformed Church buildings and cemetery, 2007
- Location: Grahamsville, New York
- Nearest city: Middletown
- Coordinates: 41°50′49″N 74°32′20″W
- Area: 20 acres (8.1 ha)
- Built: 19th century
- Architectural style: Italianate, Greek Revival, Gothic Revival
- NRHP reference No.: 79001634
- Added to NRHP: December 6, 1979

The Grahamsville Historic District is a historic district located along both sides of NY 55 just east of that hamlet in the Town of Neversink in Sullivan County, New York, United States. Its church is across the road from Tri-Valley Central School. In 1979 it was added to the National Register of Historic Places.

Five buildings are located on its 20 acres (8 ha). The centerpiece of the district is the Grahamsville Reformed Church, which dates originally to the 1840s. In 1874 it was expanded and a cemetery was added. An 1847 boarding house, also within the district, now serves as a gallery for a local artist.

== History ==
The area of today's Grahamsville had initially been settled during the colonial era, but raids by Loyalists and their Native allies killed or drove them away during the Revolution. So, after independence, the landowners of the Hardenbergh Patent invited tenants to settle in the area, named after an officer who led a unit killed in the area, once again.

The first known house in Grahamsville dates to 1788. The minimal farming opportunities in the region were supplemented by lumber, which the Catskills had in abundance, and soon that business picked up. In 1813 the town of Neversink raised taxes to build a road (now Route 55) from the Neversink River (now dammed to create Neversink Reservoir) to more-established routes at Wawarsing in Ulster County, to the east. The Marenius Dayton House, an impressive Greek Revival building in the district, was an inn and official stagecoach stop during this era

Lumbering gave way to tanning, as the Catskills' vast Eastern hemlock stands had plenty of tannin in their bark. Judge Stoddard Hammond became rich through this industry, building a tannery complex along nearby Chestnut Creek and a Gothic Revival cottage overlooking it in 1857. Like many Catskill tanners, he did extremely well during the Civil War, supplying the Union Army with all its leather.

He sold the tannery and its associated properties, including a Greek Revival company store that still survives, to his partner John Reynolds New York City after the war. Reynolds kept the tannery going, even after the Panic of 1873, and the citizens of Grahamsville were able to build their church, meeting house and cemetery at the east end of the district the following year. But in 1878 he finally closed it, and the hamlet's tanning days were ended.

With the pollution from the tanneries gone, Sullivan County became a summer resort destination in the late 19th century. The Italian villa-style Southwick House, dating to 1882, is representative of this period.

That business either faded or shifted southwards after the 1920s, and Grahamsville reverted to its farming and lumbering days. The center of the hamlet is now to the west of the district, near the junction of routes 42 and 55, in the wake of the construction of Tri-Valley Central School and Rondout Reservoir to the east. The buildings from Grahamsville's early years are still mostly intact.

== Contributing properties ==
The six elements of the district are:

- The Marenius Dayton House,
- The 1857 House, a Gothic Revival cottage,
- The Southwick House,
- Tannery Store, now a private residence,
- The Grahamsville Rural Cemetery, and
- the Grahamsville Reformed Church and its accompanying Memorial Hall

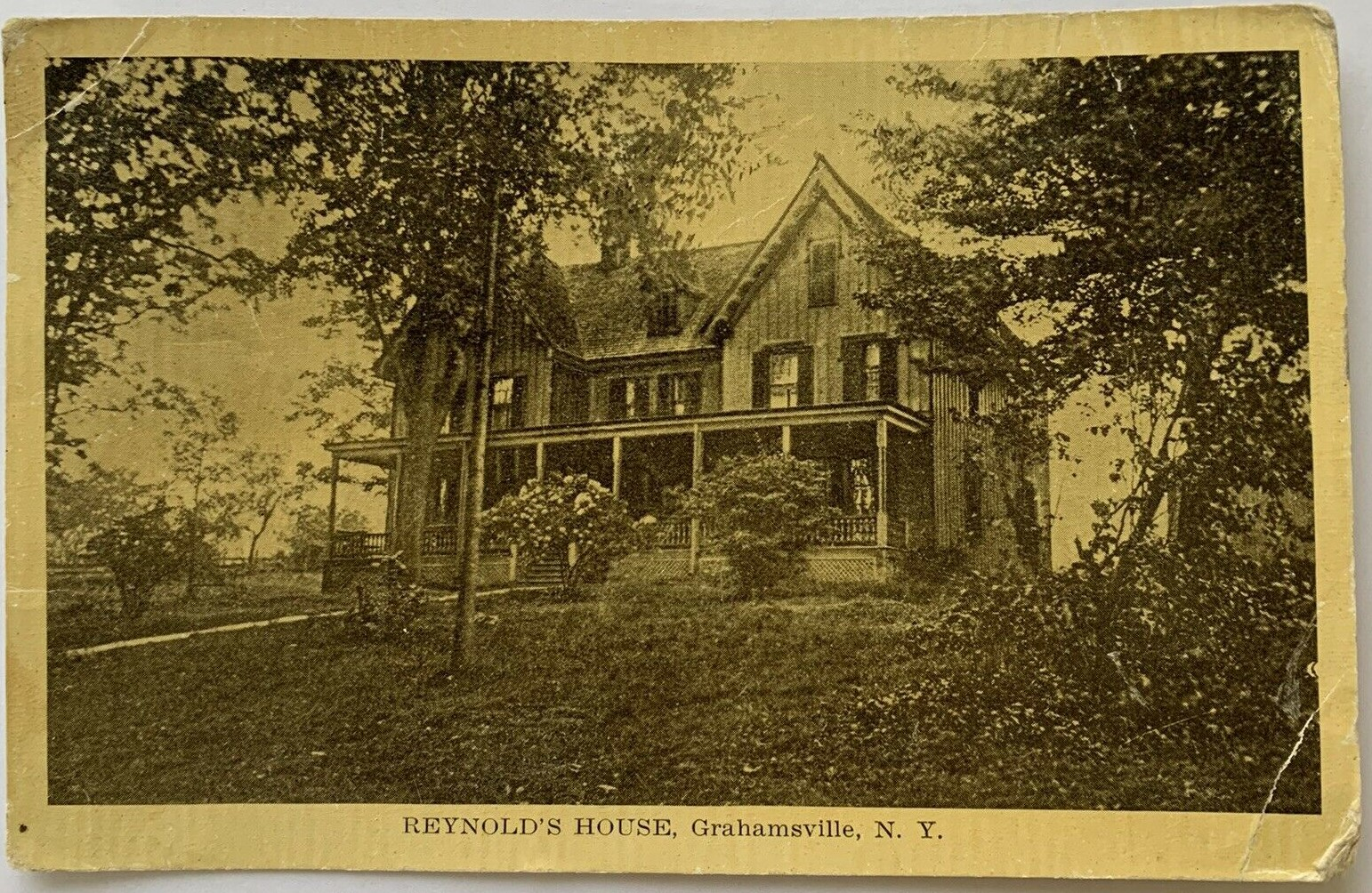
The 19th century Reynolds House is included in the town's historic district.
