= New York State Route 55A =

Highway in New York

New York State Route 55A
- Map of southern New York with NY 55A highlighted in red

Route information
- Auxiliary route of NY 55
- Maintained by NYCDOT
- Length: 9.52 mi (15.32 km)
- Existed: c. 1943–present

Major junctions
- West end: NY 55 in Neversink
- East end: NY 55 in Wawarsing

Location
- Country: United States
- State: New York
- Counties: Sullivan, Ulster

Highway system
- New York Highways; Interstate; US; State; Reference; Parkways
← NY 55	→ NY 56

New York State Route 55A (NY 55A) is a state highway located in Sullivan and Ulster counties. It is a loop route connected to NY 55 at both ends, near Grahamsville in the west and Napanoch in the east. Inside the loop is New York City's Rondout Reservoir.

== Route description ==
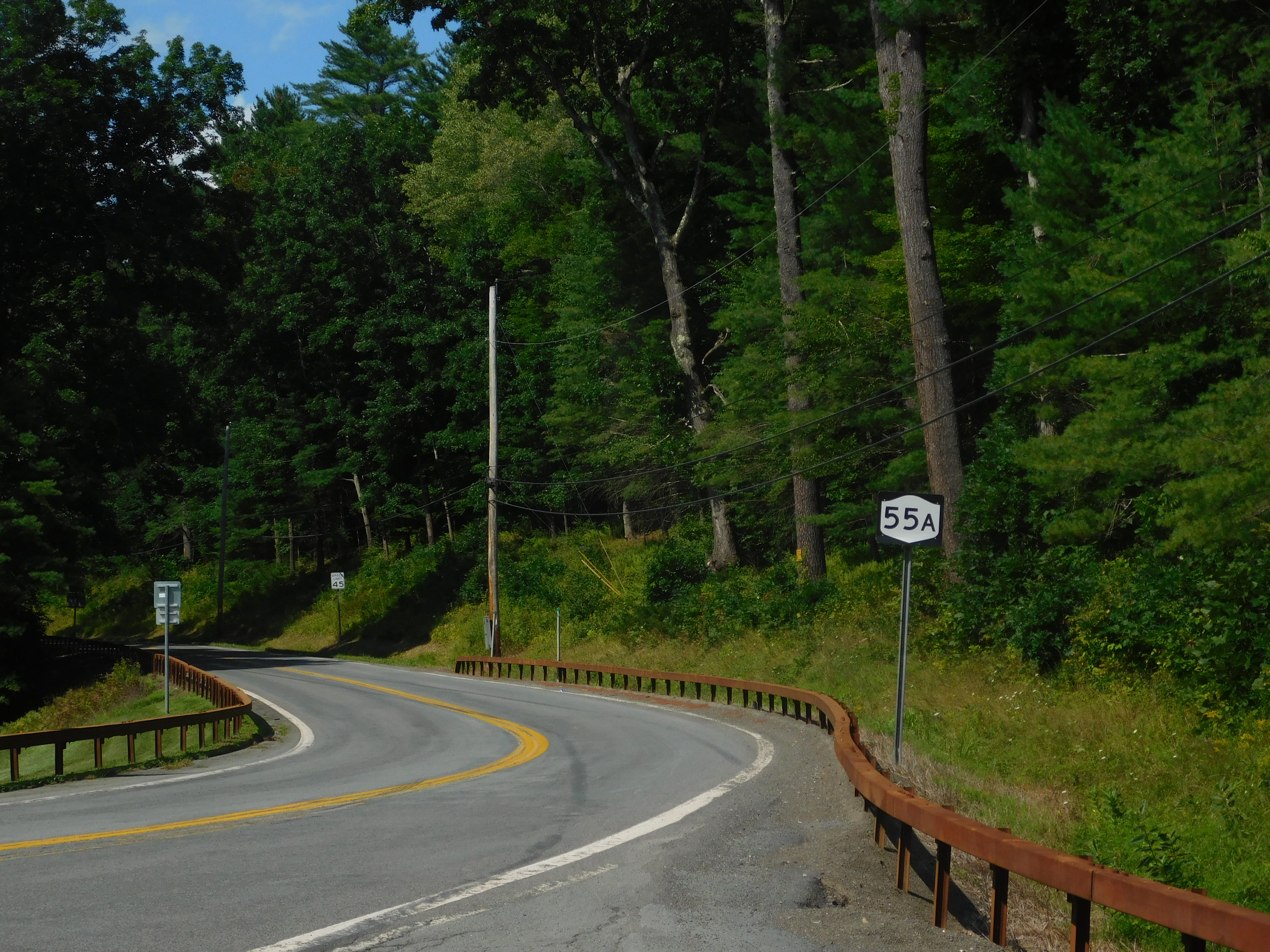
NY 55A westbound from NY 55 in Wawarsing

NY 55A begins at an intersection with NY 55 in the town of Neversink, just east of the hamlet of Grahamsville. NY 55A proceeds northeast through the Catskill State Park, and alongside Chestnut Creek, before bending eastward through Neversink. NY 55A remains mostly wooded as it begins running alongside the Rondout Reservoir as a two-lane road maintained by New York City. Passing south of several residences, NY 55A makes a gradual bend alongside the reservoir, making a stretch north past some reservoir facilities before intersecting with BWS Road, a connector to County Route 153 (CR 153; Sundown Road), which heads north to Sundown in Ulster County. At this junction, NY 55A crosses over a segment of the Rondout Reservoir and heads southward through Neversink.

NY 55A continues alongside the Rondout Reservoir's north banks, still a two-lane wooded road through town. Soon the route bends eastward, passing south of several isolated residences, splitting from the reservoir for a short distance. After nearing the reservoir once again, NY 55A intersects with Dierfelter Road, where it connects to several local residences. After a dip to the southeast, NY 55A crosses the county line out of Sullivan County and into Ulster County. Now in the town of Wawarsing, the route continues southeast along the reservoir, passing an intersection with Lackawack Hill Road. As it continues to the southeast, NY 55A passes several residences on the nearby hills as it bends eastward along the reservoir. At the end of a short eastern stretch, NY 55A intersects with CR 46 (Yaegersville Road; the Ulster County continuation of Sullivan CR 153.)

After CR 46, NY 55A crosses a small part of the reservoir, paralleling the waterway past dense woods in Wawarsing. Near Sholam Road, NY 55A bends southeast alongside the reservoir, intersecting with the road connecting to the Merriman Dam. After passing Merriman Dam, NY 55A leaves the reservoir and bends south into the hamlet of Lackawack, where it intersects with NY 55 once again. This junction serves as NY 55A's eastern terminus, a couple miles from the border of the Catskill State Park.

== History ==
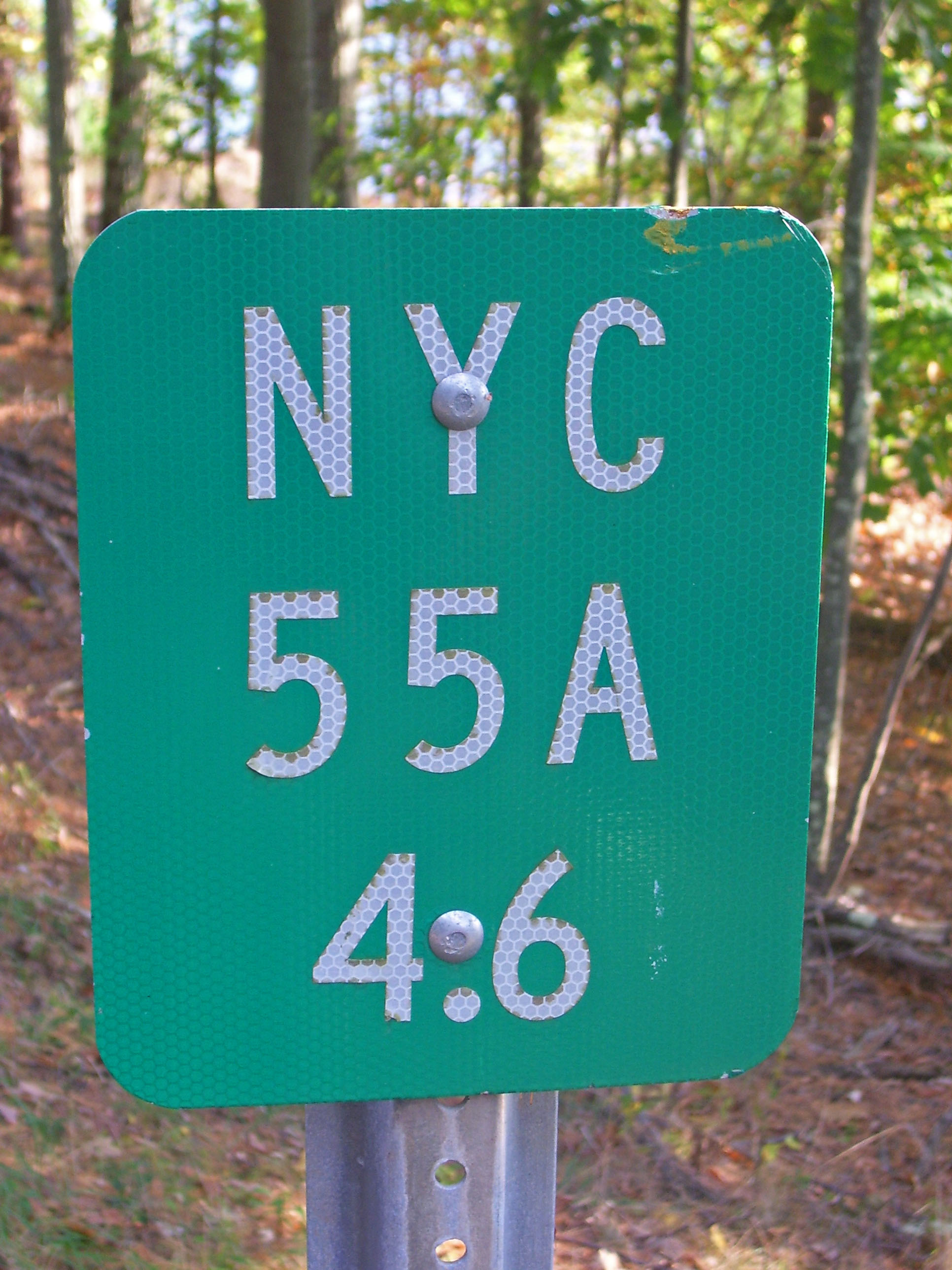
Non-standard reference marker along 55A, reflecting New York City maintenance.

When NY 55 was assigned as part of the 1930 renumbering of state highways in New York, it was routed along the northern bank of Rondout Creek between the hamlets of Grahamsville and Lackawack. Around 1943, NY 55 was realigned to follow a new highway along the southern bank while its former routing to the north became NY 55A. The westernmost portion of the northern route was also reconfigured by this time to cross Rondout Creek at Lowes Corners. Both changes were made in order to accommodate the Rondout Reservoir, which was created c. 1950 following the construction of the Merriman Dam. The reservoir was completely contained within the NY 55 / NY 55A loop, with NY 55 forming the southern edge and NY 55A comprising the western and northern extents.

== Major intersections ==
County	Location	mi	km	Destinations	Notes
Sullivan	Neversink	0.00	0.00	NY 55 – Napanoch, Grahamsville	Western terminus
Ulster	Wawarsing	9.52	15.32	NY 55 – Napanoch, Grahamsville	Eastern terminus
1.000 mi = 1.609 km; 1.000 km = 0.621 mi

== See also ==
- New York State Route 28A – Another Upstate route maintained by New York City
