= Tri-Valley Central School =

Tri-Valley Secondary School
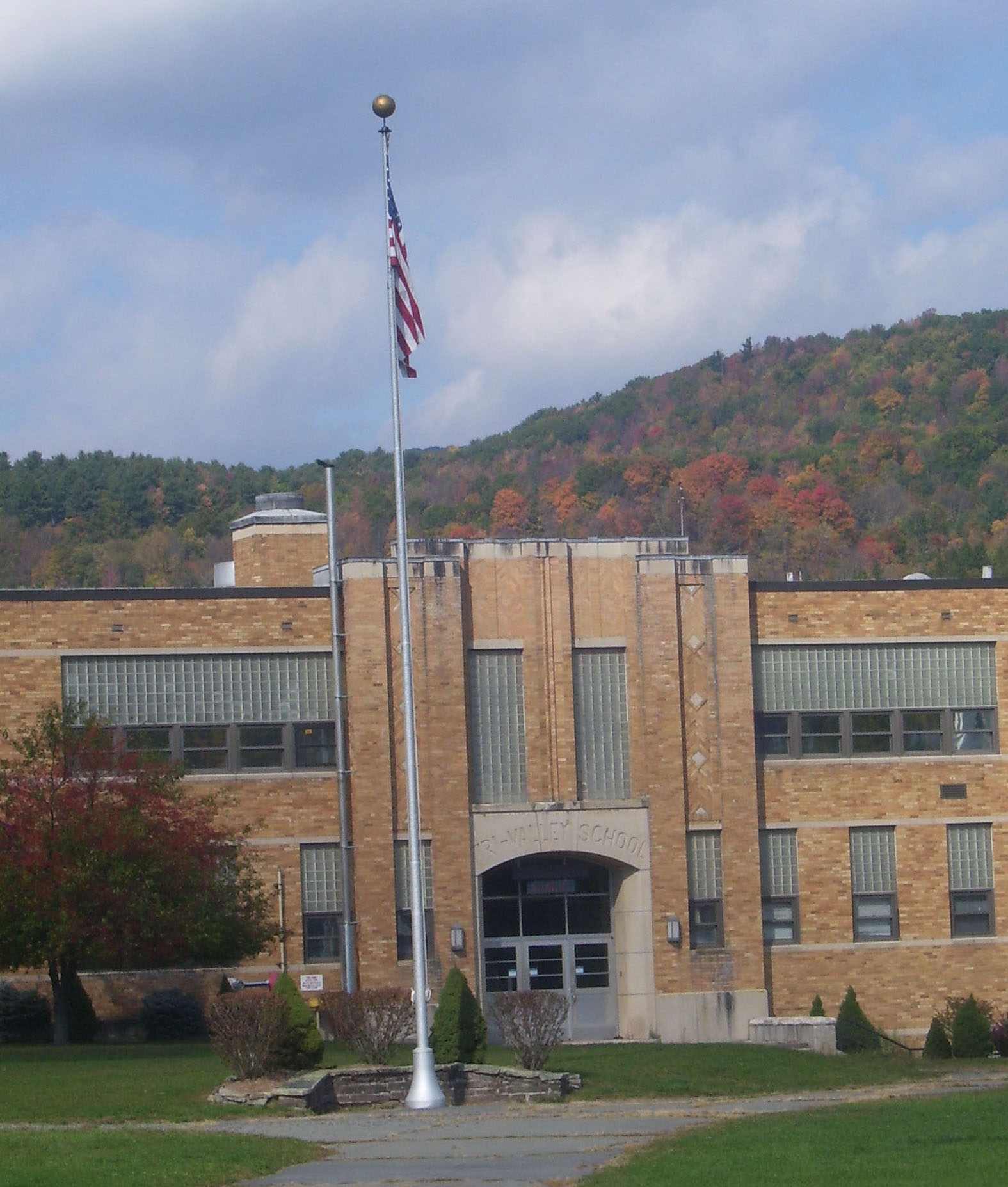
- Front entrance, 2008

Location
- 34 Moore Hill Road; Grahamsville, New York 12740; United States
- Coordinates: 41°50′54″N 74°32′20″W

Information
- Funding type: Public
- Motto: "Leading Students to Success" (High School), "Building a Foundation for the Future" (Middle School)
- School board: Tri-Valley Central School District
- Superintendent: Erin Long
- Principal: Amanda Eberly (High School), Richard Bebenroth (Elementary School)
- Staff: 177
- Grades: Pre-K-12
- Enrollment: 1,221
  - Kindergarten: 74
  - Grade 1: 78
  - Grade 2: 95
  - Grade 3: 93
  - Grade 4: 97
  - Grade 5: 90
  - Grade 6: 102
  - Grade 7: 100
  - Grade 8: 93
  - Grade 9: 121
  - Grade 10: 98
  - Grade 11: 92
  - Grade 12: 88
- Average class size: 19
- Student to teacher ratio: 9:1
- Language: English
- Campus type: rural
- Colours: red and blue
- Athletics conference: Orange County Interscholastic Athletic Association (OCIAA)
- Team name: Bears
- Communities served: Neversink, Denning
- Graduates: 82
- Website: tvcs.k12.ny.us

Tri-Valley Secondary School is located on 34 Moore Hill Road, near the Rondout Reservoir, east of Grahamsville, New York. It educates students from pre-kindergarten to twelfth grade and is within the Tri-Valley Central School District. It gets its name from the three streams that rise in that area of the Catskill Mountains, Rondout Creek, Chestnut Creek, and the Neversink River.

The original school building is used by the high school grades. It dates to the early 1950s and faces the church and cemetery in the Grahamsville Historic District just across the road. It was built on the site of the former Grahamsville one room schoolhouse. Two additions have been constructed to create the present middle and elementary schools, which combine to create a C-shaped structure with a parking lot in the middle.

== 2007 student protest ==
Shortly after the beginning of the 2007 school year, a confrontation between a school security guard and a student led to an unusual student protest that made international news. In February 2007, parents were notified of a new regional policy that prohibited students from carrying their books, school work, and belongings in backpacks between classes, as well as banning jacket wearing. The policy was intended for both student health concerns, safety concerns, and to limit the possibility to conceal weapons and other contraband. The new regulations still allowed girls to carry purses to hold their personal items. Some female students used larger purses that would accommodate their school materials as well, functioning as a book bag. After the boys of the school complained on the basis of gender discrimination, the school announced the policy would be amended to ban purses as well. Some of the students misunderstood the announcement, believing that the size of the purses was all that mattered. Rumors quickly began spreading that girls would only be allowed to carry purses during their menstrual periods.

On September 19, security guards were conducting a sweep to enforce the new rule. A ninth grade girl was among several students called out of a class to see if their bags were within the new regulations. She said that security guard Mike Bunce, upon seeing her bag, asked her if she was having her period. Later that evening she spoke to her mother about the confrontation. More girls may also have been asked the same type of question by the security guard. Soon after the incident, some girls of the school began wearing tampon boxes on necklaces in protest. Some boys wore sanitary napkins taped to their shirts as a show of support. A classmate of Martin's, Hannah Lindquist, claimed that principal Robert Worden threw her out of his office and told her she was "part of the problem" for wearing "an ob. tampon box on a piece of yarn as a necklace" to a meeting to discuss a student who might have been suspended for her protest. Another male student was arrested and charged with public lewdness, a misdemeanor in New York, after he streaked through the school wearing only a paper bag over his head, claiming he was protesting against the backpack policy.

The school board eventually placed Security Guard Mike Bunce on paid administrative leave at the beginning of October while it decided the future of his employment. Bunce had previously been forced to resign from the police department in the nearby village, Monticello, along with its then-chief, for operating a process-serving business while on the job. A month later, the district fired him.
