= Grahamsville =

Grahamsville may refer to:

- Grahamsville, New York, a hamlet in Sullivan County
- Grahamsville Historic District, in Sullivan County, New York

== See also ==
- Grahamville (disambiguation)
