= Blue Hill (New York) =

Mountain in New York, United States

- Location within New York Adirondack Park Location within the United States

Highest point
- Elevation: 2,749 feet (838 m)
- Coordinates: 41°54′42″N 74°37′09″W

Geography
- Location: WSW of Claryville, New York, U.S.
- Topo map: USGS Claryville

Blue Hill is a mountain in Sullivan County, New York. It is located west-southwest of Claryville. Denman Mountain is located east-southeast of Blue Hill.
