= Sugarloaf Mountain (Sullivan County, New York) =

Mountain in New York, United States

- Location within New York Adirondack Park Location within the United States

Highest point
- Elevation: 2,169 feet (661 m)
- Coordinates: 41°53′15″N 74°29′52″W

Geography
- Location: NE of Grahamsville, New York, U.S.
- Topo map: USGS Peekamoose Mountain

Sugarloaf Mountain is a mountain in Sullivan County, New York. It is located northeast of Grahamsville. Denman Mountain is located west-northwest, Kalonymus Escarpment is located south-southeast, and South Hill is located south-southwest of Sugarloaf Mountain.
