= Denman Mountain =

Mountain in New York, United States

- Location within New York Adirondack Park Location within the United States

Highest point
- Elevation: 3,048 feet (929 m)
- Coordinates: 41°54′10″N 74°32′23″W

Geography
- Location: N of Grahamsville, New York, U.S.
- Topo map: USGS Claryville

Denman Mountain is a mountain in Sullivan County, New York. It is located north of Grahamsville. Sugarloaf Mountain is located east-southeast and Blue Hill is located west-northwest of Denman Mountain. It is the highest peak within the Sullivan county portion of the Catskill mountains.
