= Grahamville =

Grahamville may refer to:

- Grahamville, Kentucky, an unincorporated community
- Grahamville, South Carolina, an unincorporated community

== See also ==
- Grahamsville (disambiguation)
