= Greenfield Preparative Meeting House =

Historic church in New York, United States

- U.S. National Register of Historic Places
- Location within New York Location within the United States
- Location: NY 55 at Denman Mountain Road, Grahamsville, New York
- Coordinates: 41°51′16″N 74°33′16″W
- Area: less than one acre
- Built: 1838-1839
- NRHP reference No.: 10000956
- Added to NRHP: November 29, 2010

Greenfield Preparative Meeting House, also known as the Catskill Meeting House, is a historic Quaker meeting house located in Grahamsville in Sullivan County, New York. It was built in 1838–1839, and is a one-story, six bay by two bay, rectangular wood-frame building with gable roof. It has an attached privy. It is sided in cedar clapboards and measures approximately 19 feet by 39 feet.

It was added to the National Register of Historic Places in 2010.
