= Neversink River =

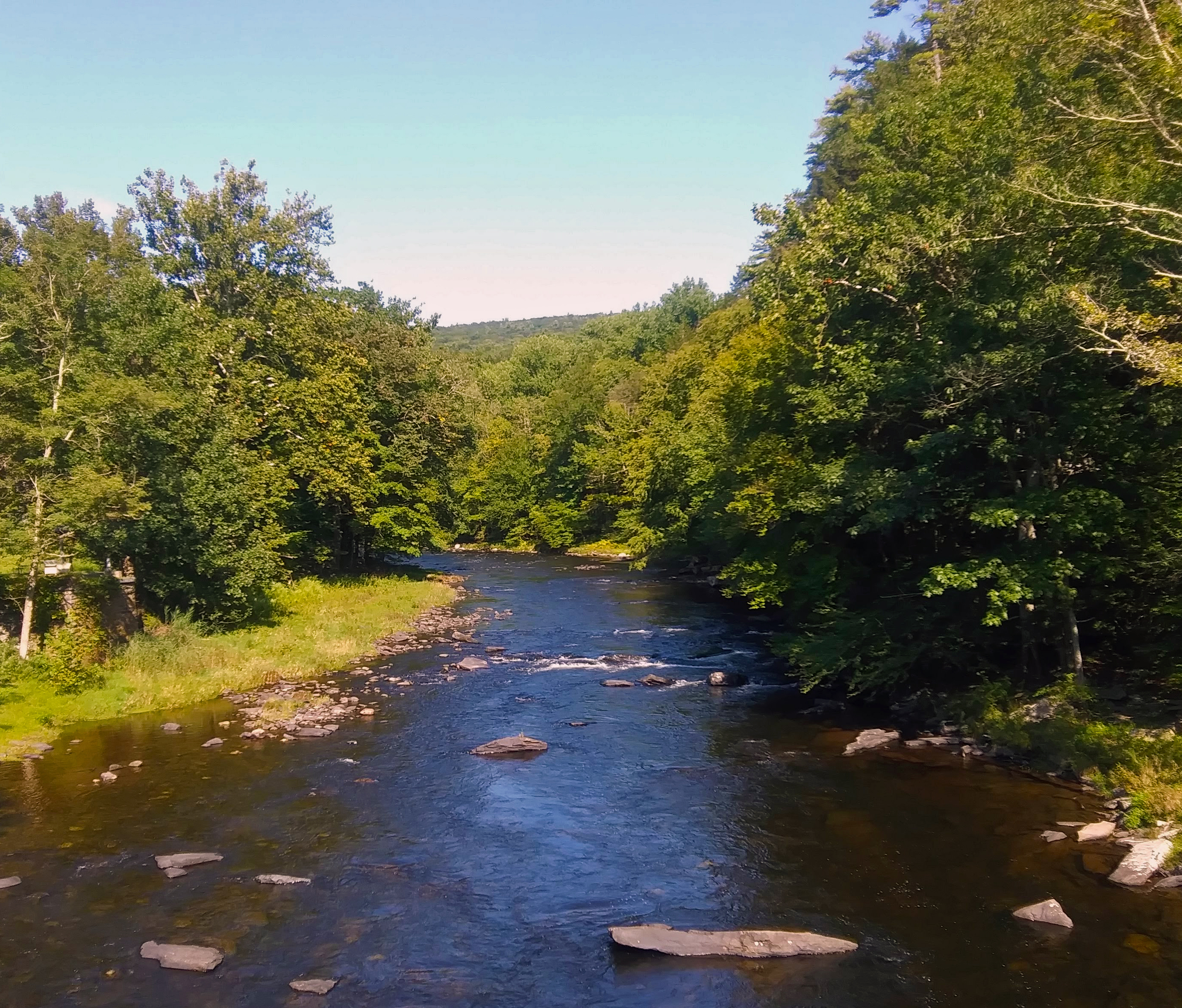
- The Neversink at Oakland Valley

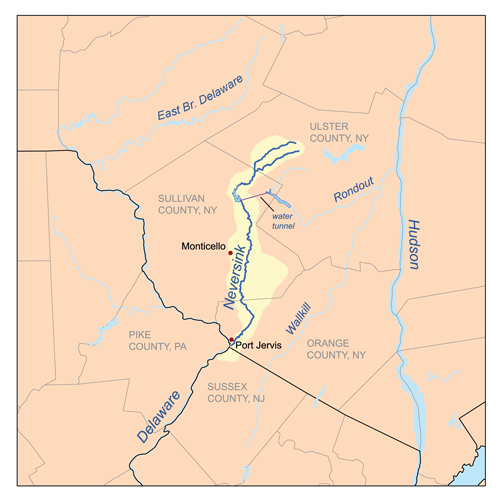
- The Neversink and its two branches

Location
- Country: United States
- State: New York
- Counties: Orange, Sullivan
- City: Port Jervis

Physical characteristics
- Source: East Branch Neversink River
  - location: S of col between Slide and Cornell mountains, Town of Shandaken, Ulster County
  - coordinates: 41°59′40″N 74°22′21″W
  - elevation: 2,960 ft (900 m)
- 2nd source: West Branch Neversink River
  - location: NW slope of Slide Mountain, Town of Shandaken
  - coordinates: 42°00′19″N 74°23′29″W
  - elevation: 3,480 ft (1,060 m)
- Source confluence
  - location: S of Claryville, Sullivan County
  - coordinates: 41°54′57″N 74°34′29″W
  - elevation: 1,600 ft (490 m)
- Mouth: Delaware River
  - location: Port Jervis, Orange County
  - coordinates: 41°21′24″N 74°41′43″W
  - elevation: 400 ft (120 m)
- Length: 55 mi (89 km)
- Basin size: 435 sq mi (1,130 km^{2})
- Discharge
  - location: Godeffroy, NY
  - average: 463 cu ft/s (13.1 m^{3}/s)
  - minimum: 32 cu ft/s (0.91 m^{3}/s)
  - maximum: 33,000 cu ft/s (930 m^{3}/s)
- Discharge
  - location: Claryville
  - average: 174 cu ft/s (4.9 m^{3}/s)

The Neversink River (also called Neversink Creek in its upper course) is a 55-mile-long (89 km) tributary of the Delaware River in southeastern New York in the United States. The name of the river comes from the name of the indigenous Lenape Navesink people.

The Neversink River is considered by many to be the birthplace of American dry fly fishing.

== Course ==
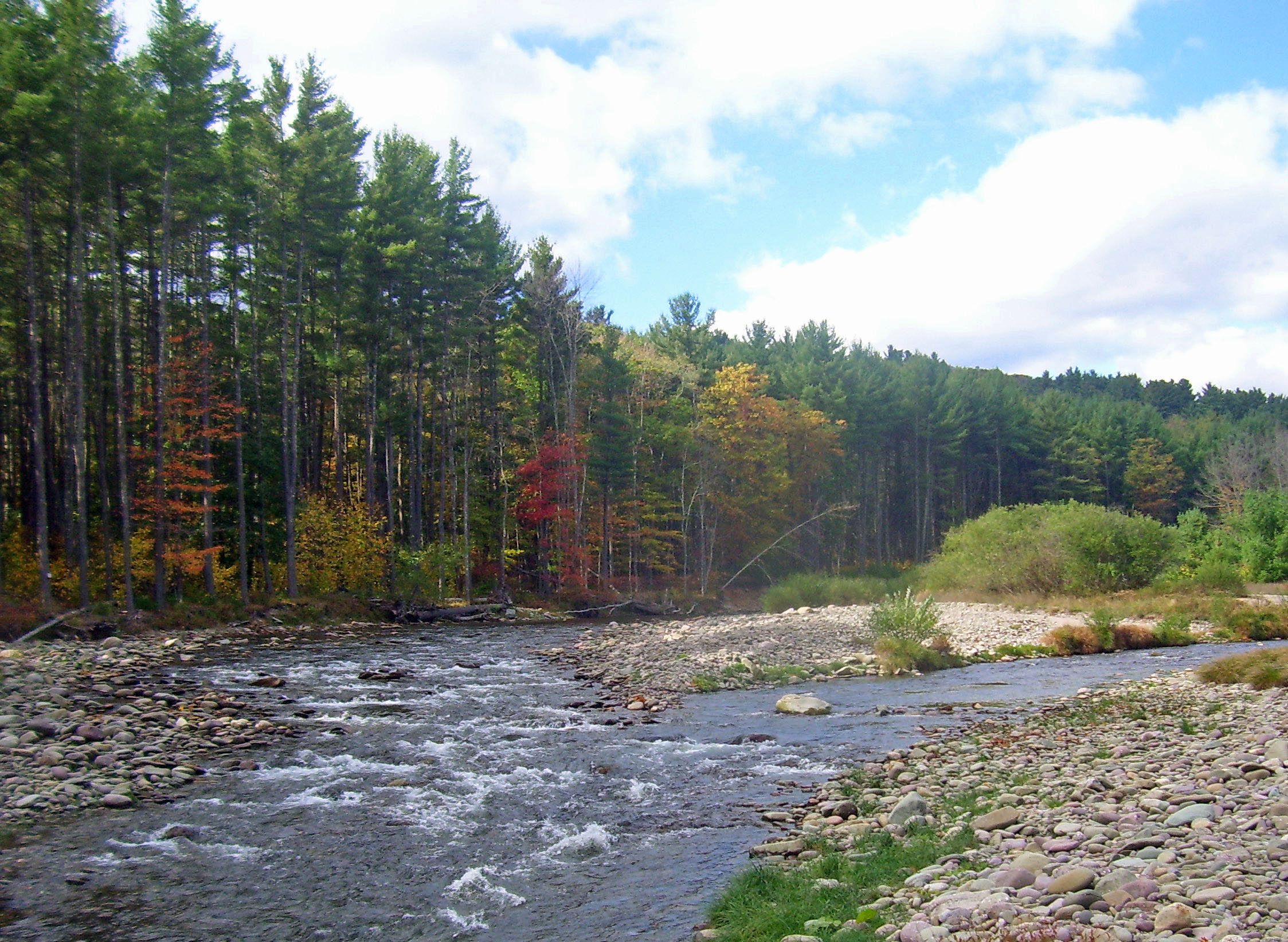
Confluence of east and west branches near Claryville

The Neversink's main flow begins just south of the border between present-day Ulster and Sullivan counties, where the east and west branches of the river join near the hamlet of Claryville. Both branches begin on the slopes of Slide Mountain, the highest peak in the Catskills. The west branch is joined by several major tributaries, such as Biscuit Brook and Pigeon Creek at Frost Valley YMCA in the town of Denning, Ulster County. In its upper course, it is a rocky and wild stream, ideal for trout fishing. But, most of the land around it is privately owned and not open to fishermen.

It flows generally southwest through the mountains. Not far downriver from the confluence in Neversink, it is impounded to form the Neversink Reservoir of the New York City Water Supply System. It is connected by a 5-mile (8 km) water tunnel to Rondout Reservoir, and subsequently to the Delaware Aqueduct. Development of the Neversink Reservoir resulted in the displacement of many locals, as several towns along the river were flooded to make the reservoir. New York City paid for their relocation.

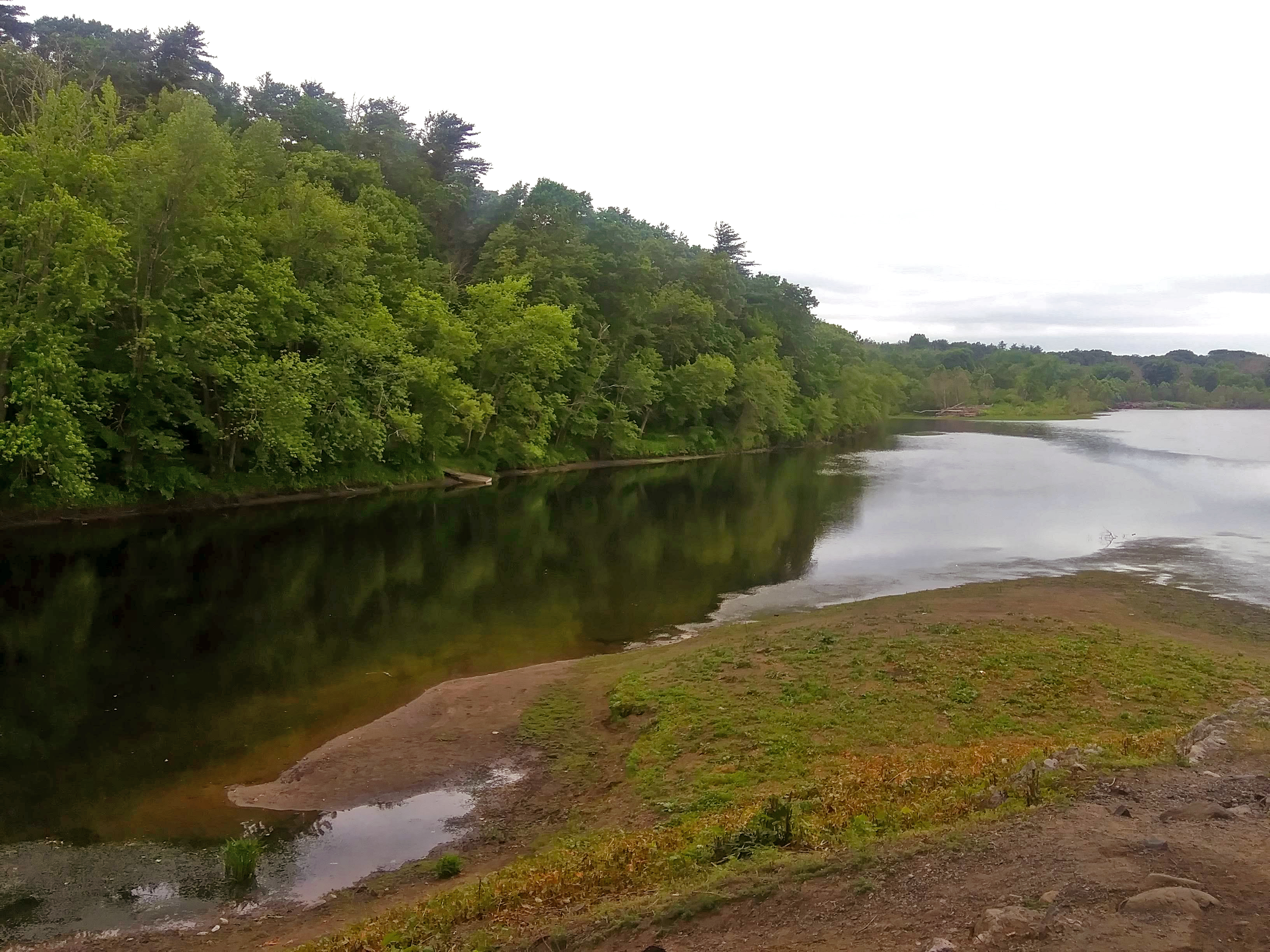
Mouth of the Neversink

It flows through the town of Fallsburg, the hamlets of Woodbourne, Fallsburg, South Fallsburg, and Old Falls. It enters the town of Thompson near Bridgeville; New York State Route 17/Interstate 86 cross it at Exit 107. The Holiday Mountain Ski Area was developed near the river. Southern Sullivan County has less developed country, and the river passes over its largest waterfalls, Denton Falls and High Falls in the Neversink Gorge. It flows southeastward into western Orange County. Near Cuddebackville, it is joined from the northeast by Basher Kill, then flows southwest. US 209 runs parallel to the river, which joins the Delaware River at Port Jervis. At this confluence with the Delaware, the Tri-States Monument marks the tripoint of the borders of New York, New Jersey, and Pennsylvania; Interstate 84 bridge passes over this point.

== Recreation ==
Along much of its length, the Neversink is a popular trout stream, mostly north of Woodbourne. In addition to rainbow trout, it sustains brown trout, brook trout and the rare tiger trout. In the 1890s Theodore Gordon expertly matched dry fishing flies to actual insects. Edward Ringwood Hewitt conducted research on insect and flies from his property above the town of Neversink. Their work led to the river gaining a reputation as birthplace of American dry fly fishing. The river is home to other fish species such as smallmouth bass, carp, sucker, bluegill, American eel, and lampreys; and a diverse range of flora and fauna.

Other forms of recreation are rarely pursued on the river. Several swimming holes are available; however, many are on private property or restricted public property. The relative narrow nature of the river is not hospitable to boating. The river is mostly navigable with small watercraft from near its dam in Hasbrouck to its mouth; however, it is seldom traveled.

== History ==
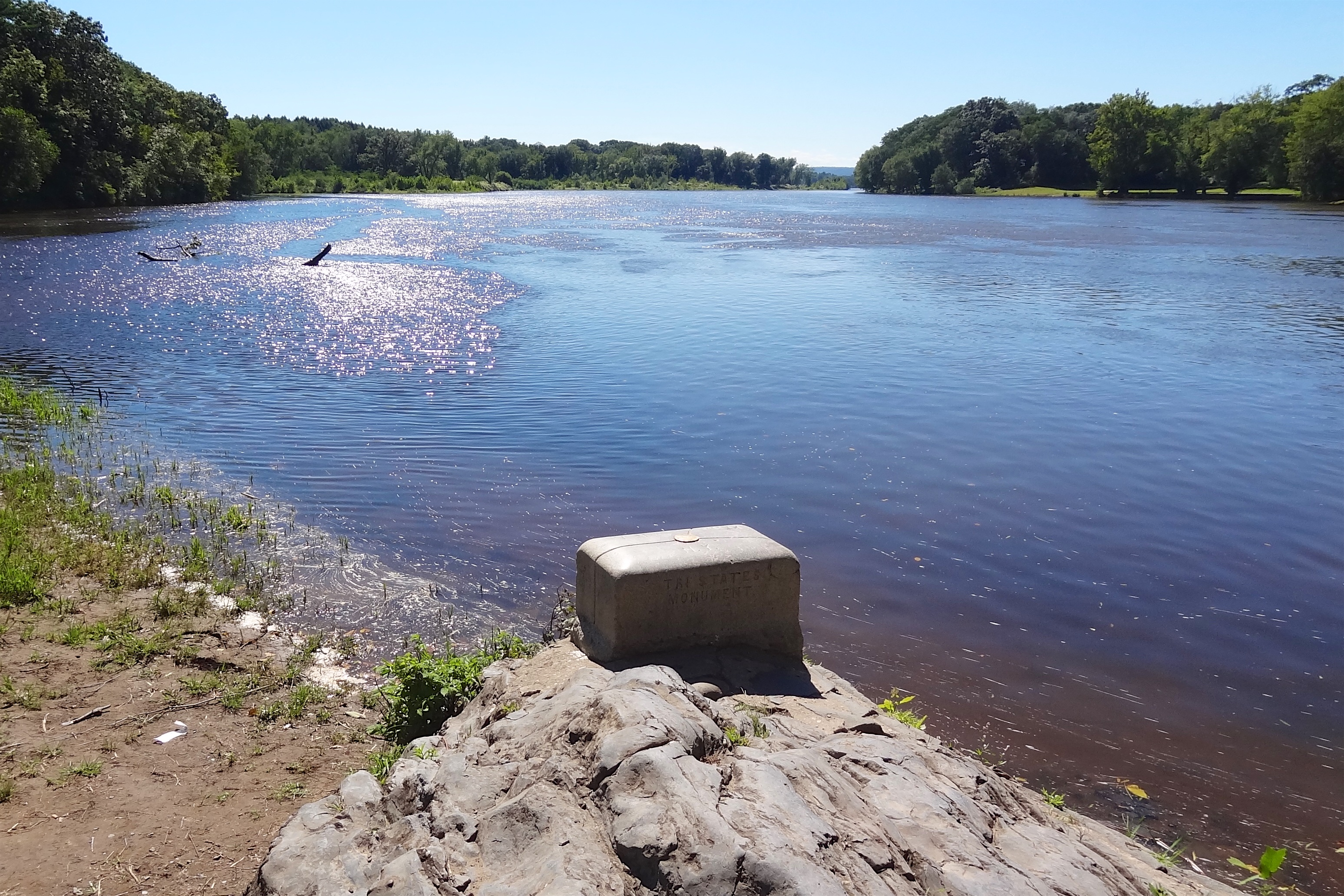
The Tri-States Monument at the confluence of the Neversink with the Delaware

The Delaware & Hudson Canal crossed the river at Cuddebackville by an early aqueduct bridge designed by John Roebling and built in 1851.

In the late 19th century the river was said to have been navigable to Claryville, where a tannery operated. The river provided a transportation waterway for the tannery's products as well as smaller steam-propelled vessels.

In heavy rains the Neversink River sometimes floods near its mouth at the Delaware River. This occurred most recently in April 2005, causing some destruction and dislocation in the Port Jervis area. The Myers Grove community near Huguenot was particularly affected. In addition, heavy rains, in combination with an extended period of unusually warm weather after a moderate to heavy winter with a considerable snowpack, can produce devastating floods at the headwaters of the river from January to April. The snowpack melt increases the volume in the river at the same time as rain.

A detailed history of the river can be found in James Eldrige Quinlan's History of Sullivan County, published in 1873.

== Tributaries ==
- Basha Kill
- Sheldrake Stream
- Eden Brook
- Mullet Brook
- Monell Brook

== See also ==
- Cuddebackville Dam
- List of crossings of the Neversink River
- List of New York rivers
- Neversink Preserve
