= Levitz Family Farm =

- U.S. National Register of Historic Places
- U.S. Historic district
- Location within New York Location within the United States
- Nearest city: Grahamsville, New York
- Coordinates: 41°47′51″N 74°32′0″W
- Area: 112 acres (45 ha)
- Built: 1910
- NRHP reference No.: 01001497
- Added to NRHP: January 24, 2002

Levitz Family Farm is a national historic district located at Grahamsville in Sullivan County, New York. The district includes six contributing buildings, one contributing site, and two contributing structures. They include a farmhouse, dairy barn, milk houses, brooder house, chicken coops, garage, and well house. They were once associated with two farms that were combined in the 1940s. The farmhouse was built in 1913 and is a 2-story, three-by-two-bay, wood-frame building on a stone foundation.

It was listed on the National Register of Historic Places in 2002.
