= C. Burton Hotel =

- U.S. National Register of Historic Places
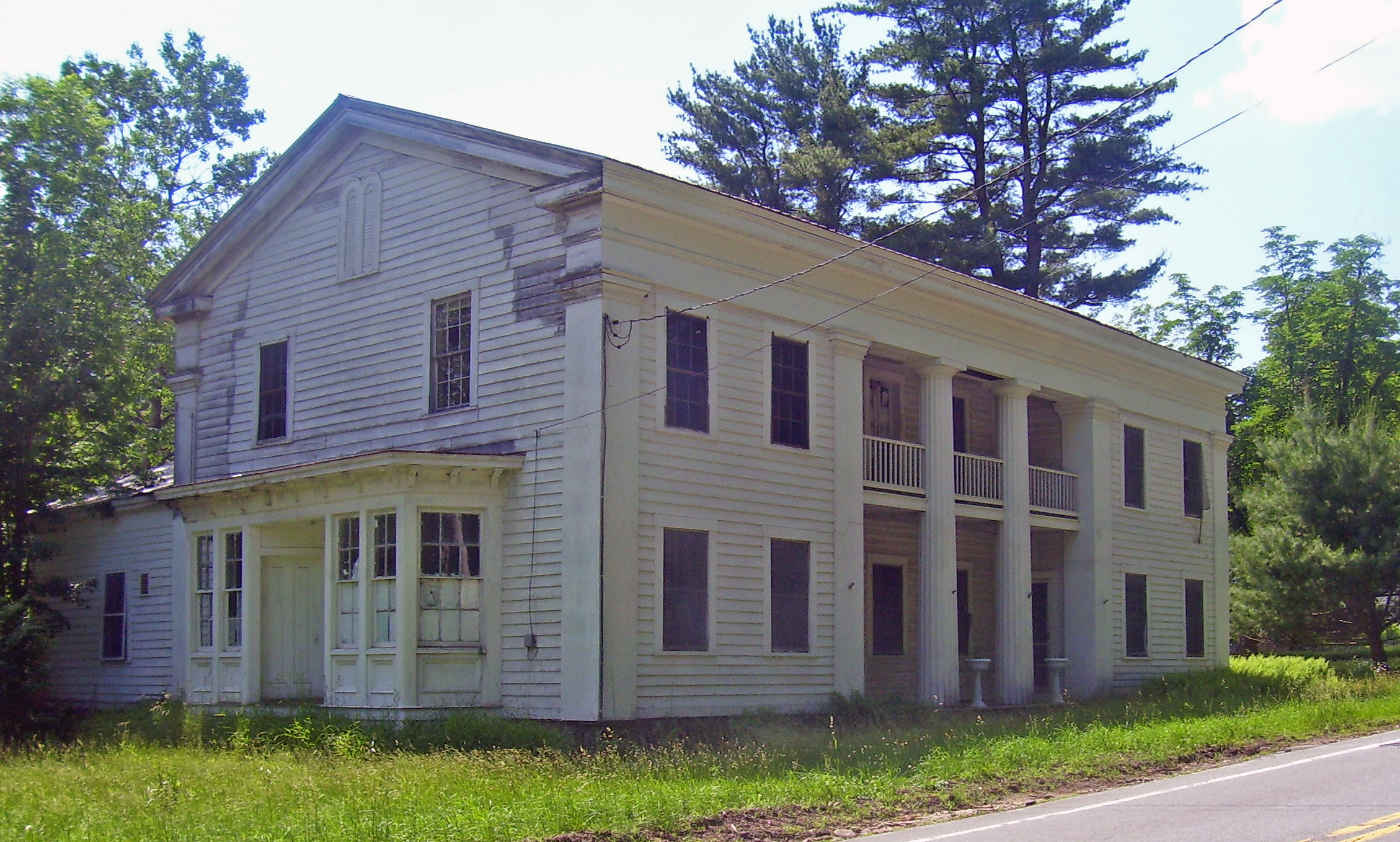
- Front (north) elevation and west profile, 2008
- Location: Grahamsville, NY
- Nearest city: Middletown
- Coordinates: 41°51′32″N 74°34′37″W
- Built: 1851; expanded 1853
- Architectural style: Greek Revival
- NRHP reference No.: 05000171
- Added to NRHP: 2005

The C. Burton Hotel, also known as the Sycamore House, is located on NY 55 a mile west of Grahamsville, New York, United States. It is a wooden Greek Revival structure dating to 1851.

In its later years it was used as a house and a medical office; currently it is unoccupied. In 2005 it was added to the National Register of Historic Places.

== Building ==
As it currently stands the building is a rectangular two-story six-by-two-bay structure on a stone foundation. Its front facade is centered on a recessed porch, with large fluted Doric columns, echoed by similar cornerboards. A broad gabled roof is covered in metal cladding, and round-arched louver windows are near the top at either end. The rear features a polygonal bay with two entrance doors.

The building is sided in clapboard. The roofline is marked by a deep molded cornice with returns and a wide entablature.

Three French doors give entrance from the recessed front porch to the interior, which retains its original plan. The large entrance hall has a set of stairs which lead to the ballroom upstairs, as well as a smaller area that may have been partitioned off from it to make a kitchen. Many areas, particularly in the central portion of the building, also have their original finishes and trim, including some marble mantels.

== History ==
The building's seamless and symmetrical appearance belies its original construction and expansion. C. Burton (Note: His first name has not been identified.) originally built the small southern section as a roadside tavern in 1851. Although he was not on the main turnpike route through the area at the time, (Note: It veered to the west at the nearby junction with what is today Claryville Road (Sullivan County Route 19), and was until the late 1940s the central segment of NY 42).) business was apparently good enough that he expanded the building threefold two years later, adding the current main block.

It continued to do well under his and other ownership throughout the rest of the century, first for travelers and then as a regional vacation center, with guests coming via stagecoach from the New York, Orange & Western station in nearby Fallsburg. Starting in 1898, the Grahamsville Fair was held on the land behind the hotel, boosting annual visitation. Early in the new century, the first of two doctors began using it as a residence and office while continuing to put up guests as well, under the names Sycamore House and Hawthorne House.

Grahamsville's resort traffic began to decline with the change in vacationing patterns as the 20th century progressed, and it was just north of Fallsburg and other areas to the south and east that had been dominated by Jewish summer communities, which captured most of that market, the largest segment still regularly visiting the Catskills for extended periods in the summer.

From 1938 until 1953 or 1954, it was owned by Dr. Karl H. Messinger, who used the ground floor as his offices, surgery and waiting room. The upper floor was the family's living quarters, including the ballroom which served as the living/dining room. The north extension was rented as a two-story apartment. Dr. Messinger extensively restored the building during his ownership, including adding a garage to the west side of the building, removing four outdated and unsafe fireplaces, while retaining the marble mantels and surrounds where possible, and replacing the essentially unusable floor in the entrance porch. The flooring he used was marble from tombstones abandoned when the Rondout Reservoir was flooded. They were laid face down in red grout, except for one at the main entrance which was engraved "Home At Last". Dr. Messinger and his family moved away from Grahamsville in 1953, the completion of the Reservoir having made the essentially cashless economy of the area unable to support a medical practice, and sometime within the next couple of years, he sold the property.

In 1994 those owners in turn sold to another family, which has been trying to restore the house while living elsewhere.

== Aesthetics ==
The hotel's implementation of the Greek Revival style, and its size, is unusually sophisticated for a rural commercial building far from any major city then (or now).

== See also ==
- National Register of Historic Places listings in Sullivan County, New York
