= Frost Valley YMCA =

Coordinates: 41°59′20″N 74°30′20″W

Frost Valley YMCA is a camping, environmental education, and conferencing center located in Claryville, New York, part of the Catskill Mountains. Founded in 1901 as Camp Wawayanda, the camp moved to its present location in 1958.

During the summer, Frost Valley runs a camp for 6–15 year-olds, most of whom are from New York, New Jersey, and Connecticut. Throughout the rest of the year, Frost Valley hosts school groups and other organizations for environmental education and conferencing activities.

== Summer Camp ==
The summer camp program at Frost Valley runs for eight weeks (four sessions, 12 days each). Each session starts on a Sunday and ends on a Friday, and nearly 500 campers attend each session. About 250 summer-time staff arrive the week before the first session, many of whom were campers when they were younger. Campers are broken up into villages by age and live together in cabin groups. Each village has a corresponding brother or sister village for the opposite gender of the same age. Camp is separated into two halves, Camp Wawayanda (ages 7–12) and Camp Henry Hird (ages 13–15). During the day, the camp schedule includes Specialties, Waterfront, Sports & Games, Feeling Good and an Evening Program.

The Wellness Philosophy has been a part of camp for several decades. The camp promotes growth in "mind, body, and spirit" and the motto is "Build Strong." Frost Valley focuses on keeping its guests healthy and happy.

The final week of summer is devoted to a Family Camp where family members from all generations come together for a week.

=== Villages ===
Villages are groupings of cabins or lodges, and most villages accommodate 30–40 campers each. Campers live in cabins or lodges that sleep eight per room. There is a 1-to-4 or 5 counselor to camper ratio, except when a camper has dialysis, in that case, there is a 3:8 counselor to camper ratio.

The villages are:

- Wawayanda
  - Rusk Mountain Village – Girls Grade 6 – 7
  - Fir Mountain Village – Boys Grade 6-7
  - Vly Mountain Village – Girls Grade 5-6
  - Eagle Mountain Village – Boys Grade 5-6
  - Rocky Mountain Village – Girls and Boys Grade 2-4
  - Barkaboom Mountain Village – Mini-MAC
- Henry Hird
  - Hunter Mountain Village – Girls Grade 10
  - Slide Mountain Village – Boys Grade 10
  - Graham Mountain Village – Girls Grade 9
  - Peekamoose Mountain Village – Boys Grade 9
  - Plateau Mountain Village – Girls Grade 8
  - Wittenberg Mountain Village – Boys Grade 8
  - Balsam Lake Mountain Village – MAC Girls
  - Panther Mountain Village – MAC Boys
- Tokyo Village - Girls and Boys Grade 1-11

There are also several mixed-gender villages with special focuses: Adventure Village (previously known as Woodwise), and MAC (Mainstreaming at Camp, YAI National Institute for People with Disabilities, for children and young adults with developmental disabilities, and the Tokyo-Frost Valley Partnership which focuses on addressing the needs of Japanese and Japanese-American youth in the tri-state area.

Various other villages have also existed in the history of the camp, including Sequoia, an adventure village, and Phoenix, the precursor to Sycamore. Iscusfa was an arts program that was last ran in Summer 2006.

=== Dialysis program ===
Established in 1975, over 1000 children and adolescents with kidney disease have attended the resident camp program at Frost Valley YMCA, under the supervision of the Ruth Gottscho Dialysis and Children's Kidney Program. The program was the first of its kind in the U.S., allowing children receiving hemodialysis or peritoneal dialysis, in chronic renal failure, or post-transplant, to participate in a traditional residential camp experience.

The children are part of the mainstream camp environment, and participate as fully as possible in all camping activities. The program is based in a full-service, on-site dialysis unit, equipped for hemodialysis, continuous ambulatory peritoneal dialysis (CAPD), as well as care of the post-transplant and pre-dialysis camper. The unit is staffed by pediatric nephrologists and nephrology nurses, under the supervision of the Children's Hospital at Montefiore. Special attention is given to the individual medical and developmental needs of each child, and treatment schedules are arranged to allow for maximum participation in camp activities.

=== Counselor-in-Training program ===
The Counselor-in-Training (CIT) or Adventure- in-Training (AIT) program is a month-long program for 16-year-olds who have an interest in becoming camp counselors. The program consists of three weeks at camp, training, working, and having an in-cabin experience, and one week hiking. During the in-camp portion, CITs work together to plan and run programs for campers. The out-trip has varied in length from 6 to 10 days and includes backpacking through the Catskill Mountains or Adirondack Mountains .

=== Adventure programs ===
The Adventure Trip program was established in 1968, when Henry "Bud" Cox took a group of teens on a 2-week backpacking trip throughout the Catskills. Today, Adventure Trips travel around the country. The trips are designed for campers ages 11–17 who are looking for a different experience than the traditional resident camp. Trips vary from traditional backcountry adventures to service learning expeditions focused on giving back to communities in need, such as through partnerships with Habitat for Humanity. Activities available through the trip programs include whitewater rafting, rock climbing, backpacking, canoeing, surfing, skateboarding, spelunking, volunteer service, biking, sea kayaking, and high ropes.

== Winter camp ==
Frost Valley offers a complete overnight winter camp with activities including snow tubing, snow shoe hikes, cross-country skiing, and its own Winter Olympics program.
