= Conor Crickmore =

American farmer (born 1970)

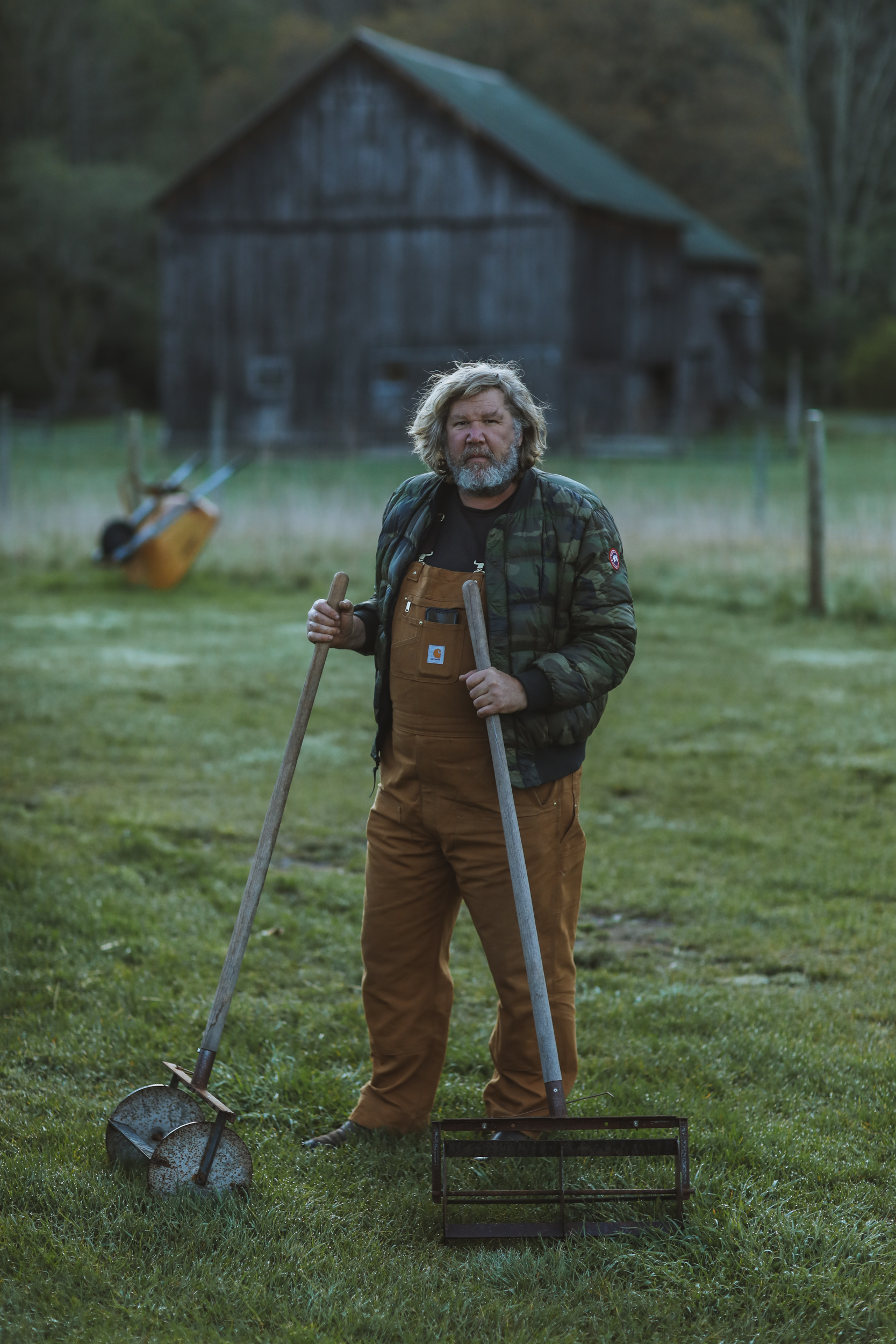
Conor Crickmore at Neversink Farm, with his tool creation; The Gridder

Conor Crickmore (born February 3, 1970) is an American farmer, educator, and tool designer. In 2009, he started Neversink Farm, which is known for its no till methods and high production on small acreage. He also develops small scale farming tools through his company, Neversink Tools. Conor is a pioneer of No Till small production farming and now teaches these methods to young farmers.

== Background ==
In 2009, Conor with his wife Kate moved from New York City to homestead in a fishing cabin in the Catskills. He and his wife started Neversink Farm a small 1.5 acre organic farm just down the road on leased land. They later purchased the farm with money earned from farming. They developed their own no-till farming techniques which along with efficient systems created one of the most productive small scale farms per square feet in the country.

Neversink Farm was brought to the wide attention of farmers after being on the popular farming podcast, Farmer to Farmer, hosted by Chris Blanchard. It became one of the most downloaded of Chris Blanchards shows. The farm was then featured in a YouTube video by Diego Footer, which received over 2 million views.

Conor presently educates other farms through farm workshops, a YouTube channel, and his online farming course aimed at small scale farmers creating profitable and sustainable farms. He is a proponent of bringing non-farmers into a more self reliant life that brings people closer to their own food by growing it themselves, and creating tiny, yet successful family farms.

Conor also creates tools for the small scale farm and manufactures and sells them through his company Neversink Tools. The patented “mutineer” was the company's first successful tool. It is an interchangeable hoe using a quick connect to change out heads. Many other tools have since followed; the iconoclast, the gridder, and the inferno.

== Neversink Farm ==
Neversink Farm is a certified organic farm in Claryville, New York. It was opened by Conor Crickmore and his wife Kate Crickmore in 2009. Neversink Farm is a 1.5 acre No-Till organic farm. "No Till" at Neversink, is described by Conor as reducing soil disturbance and keeping soil layers intact. Neversink Farm uses a permanent bed system. This method maintains soil structure and the life that the soil supports, reduces weed pressure, and increases organic matter.
