= Bridgeville, New York =

Bridgeville
- hamlet and CDP
- Location within the state of New York
- Coordinates: 41°38′14″N 74°37′05″W
- Country: United States
- State: New York
- County: Sullivan
- Time zone: UTC-5 (Eastern (EST))
  - Summer (DST): UTC-4 (EDT)

Bridgeville is a hamlet (and census-designated place) southeast of Monticello (the county seat) located in the southern Catskill Mountains in the Town of Thompson, County of Sullivan, and State of New York, United States. Bridgeville is located on the Neversink River on New York State Route 17 (future Interstate 86), at an elevation of 1,081 feet (329 m). It has hilly terrain.

Although Bridgeville is not a corporate entity and does not have a post office of its own, the census-designated place had a population of 149 as of the 2020 census. See Town of Thompson for area demographic information. Bridgeville shares a ZIP code with nearby Monticello of 12701 and telephone area code 845.

== Attractions ==
The Neversink River is well known for fly-fishing and Bridgeville is a popular location for fishermen. Bridgeville is also the site of Holiday Mountain Ski Park.

== History ==
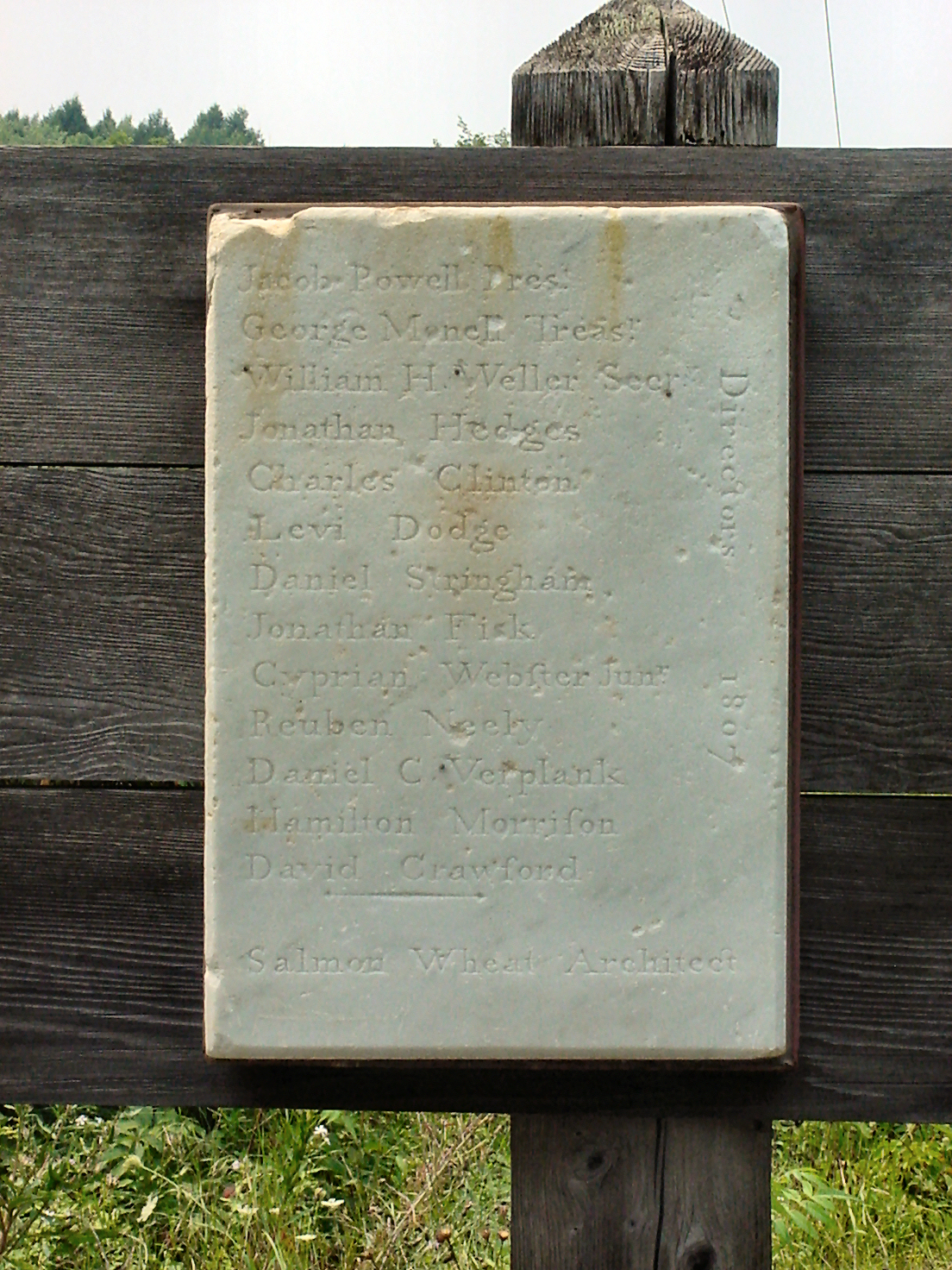
Bridgeville historic 1807 bridge marker.

Indigenous inhabitants of this area included members of the Algonquian and Lene Lenape (aka Delaware) tribes.

Bridgeville was the site of the first covered bridge in New York State, built in 1807 to facilitate construction of the Newburgh-Cochecton Turnpike, a major frontier thoroughfare connecting communities on the Delaware and Hudson rivers. From Newburgh, the turnpike took the route of the modern State Route 17K to Bloomingburg in the Town of Mamakating, from there following the present State Route 17 (future I-86), and thence for the entire length of State Route 17B from Monticello west to Cochecton, on the upper Delaware. The ambitious project of building this road opened new territory for European conquest and development, spread commerce and greatly enhanced the tanning industry, which subsequently provided much of the leather used in boots for Union soldiers during the American Civil War.

The old bridge was demolished in 1923, replaced by the present-day span (Sullivan County Bridge #285) over the Neversink River. According to a marker that was placed on the original bridge, the architect was Maj. Salmon Wheat, a farmer who lived near the present village of Howells; and directors of the company were Jacob Powell, president; George Manell, treasurer; William H. Veller, secretary; Jonathan Hedges, a Newburgh physician; Charles Clinton; Levi Dodge; Daniel Stringham; Jonathan Fisk, a Newburgh attorney; Cyprian Webster, Jr.; Reuben Neely, member of New York State Assembly; Daniel C. Verplank of Fishkill; Hamilton Morrison, later a Commissioner of Common Schools for the Town of New Windsor; and David Crawford, a Hudson River boat captain whose former residence now houses the Historical Society of Newburgh Bay and the Highlands.

In July 1994, a civil judgment was entered against the Town of Thompson in New York State Supreme Court, in the Matter of the application of Edwin Olmstead for a Judgment under Article 78 of the Civil Practice Law and Rules mandating proper care of the old Hoyt Cemetery in Bridgeville.

In 2004, in anticipation of the settlement of long-standing legal claims to Indian reservation lands, the Stockbridge-Munsee Community filed a land trust application for approximately 330 acres (130 ha) in Bridgeville, and the Cayuga Indian Nation of New York announced a venture with the owner of Monticello Raceway, Empire Resorts, to build a $500 million casino adjacent to the Monticello Raceway. However, as a result of the United States Supreme Court's subsequent decision in City of Sherrill, NY v. Oneida Indian Nation of New York, 125 S. Ct. 1478 (March 29, 2005), Governor George Pataki withdrew pending legislation and land claim settlements with the Seneca-Cayuga Tribe of Oklahoma, the Cayuga Nation of New York, the Oneida Nation of Wisconsin, and the Stockbridge-Munsee Community. The withdrawal did not include a separate proposal by the St. Regis Mohawk Tribe, whose land claim was not affected by the Sherrill case. In light of these developments, the only casino development that, as of August 2005, seemed imminent in Sullivan or Ulster Counties was the one planned by the St. Regis Mohawks.

== Hydrology ==
Bridgeville is the site of one of several water meters called "flow targets" by which the New York State Department of Environmental Conservation monitors the fish habitat, water levels and temperature below the Neversink Dam. The confluence of the Neversink and the upper Delaware River is about 16 miles (26 km) downstream. Readings from Bridgeville and similar flow targets at Hale Eddy and Harvard are reported to the Delaware River Basin Commission for use in controlling flow releases in providing drinking water to the river basin which includes greater metropolitan New York City, Philadelphia, and Trenton.

== Other external links ==
- A few historical items pertaining to Bridgeville, N.Y.
- Holiday Mountain Ski and Fun Park
