= Catskill Park =

Nature preserve in southeastern New York, U.S.

Coordinates: 42°05′N 74°30′W

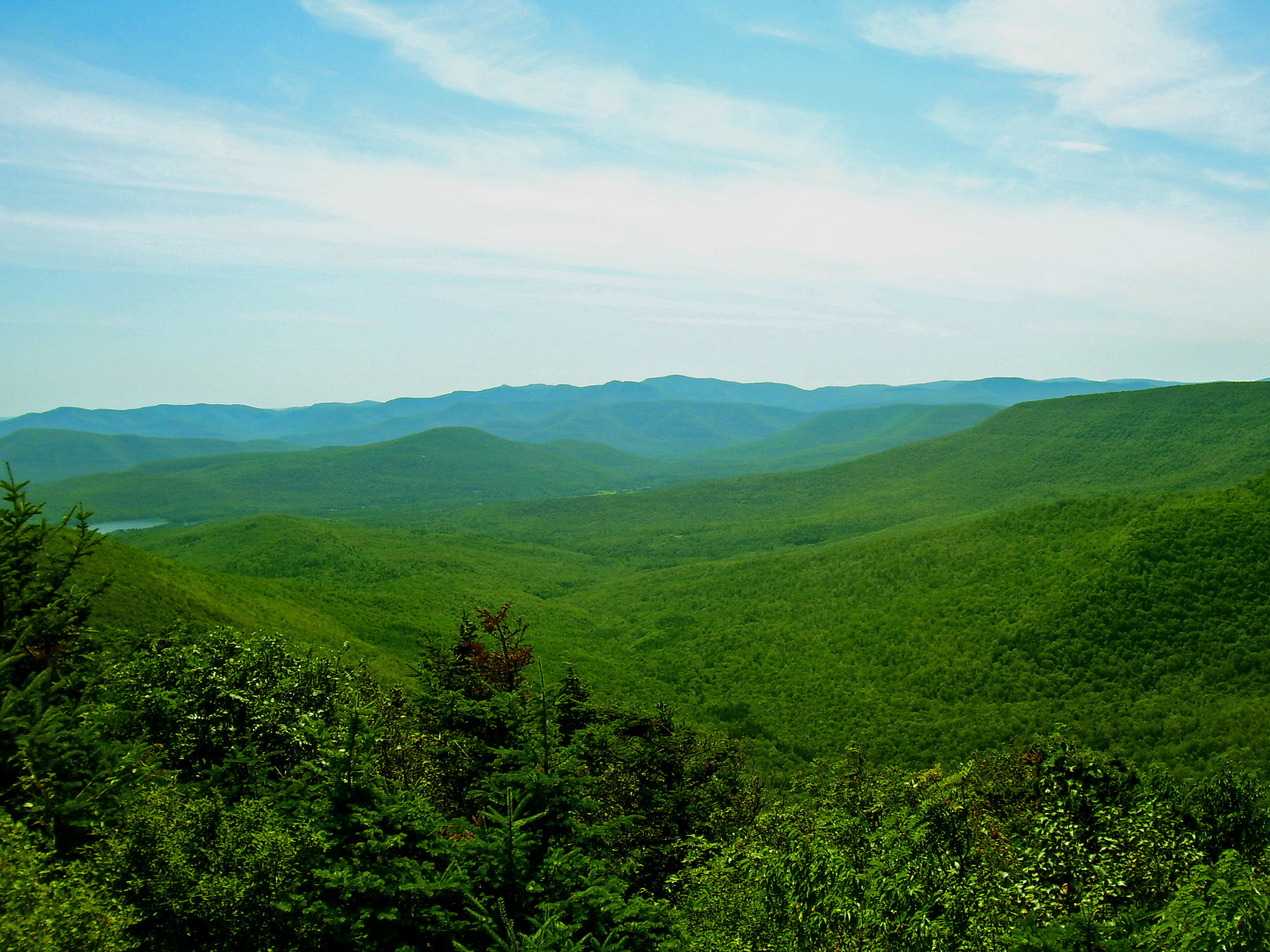
- View to central Catskills from Twin Mountain

- Catskill Park within New York state
- Location: Delaware, Greene, Sullivan, Ulster, Catskill Mountains, New York, United States
- Area: 1,120 sq mi (2,900 km^{2})
- Established: 1885
- Visitors: 553,000 (in 2002)

The Catskill Park is the designation for a large area of eastern New York centered on the Catskill Mountains. Like Adirondack Park to the north, the area is unusual in the United States because, while the entire area is considered "parkland", as of 2005 about 54 percent of the land within the boundary consists of privately owned inholdings. Another 5 percent is owned by New York City to protect four of the city's reservoirs that either lie partially within the park or have watersheds encompassing parts of the park. The remaining 41 percent, or 287,500 acres (116,300 ha), is publicly owned by the state as part of the Forest Preserve.

Like Adirondack Park, the total acreage is defined by a Blue Line which encompasses all or part of four counties: Delaware, Greene, Sullivan, and Ulster, amounting to about 700,000 acres (280,000 ha; 2,800 km^{2}).

There are bobcats, minks and fishers in the preserve, and coyotes are often heard. There are some 400 black bears living in the region. The state operates numerous campgrounds and there are over 300 miles (500 km) of multi-use trails. Hunting is permitted, in season, in much of the park. It has approximately 50,000 permanent residents, bolstered somewhat by second-home ownership on weekends and in the summer, and attracts about half a million visitors every year.

The park is governed by Article 14 of the state constitution, which stipulates that all land owned or acquired by the state within cannot be sold or otherwise transferred (absent amending the constitution, which has been done on several occasions), may not be used for logging and must remain "forever wild."

== Location ==
The park boundary stretches from near the Hudson River just west of the city of Kingston in the east to the East Branch of the Delaware River near Hancock at its westernmost. Its northern extreme is at Windham and its southernmost point is between the hamlet of Napanoch and Rondout Reservoir.

In contrast to the Adirondack Park, the Catskill Park does not include all the land generally considered to be part of the Catskill Range. However, all but two of the 35 Catskill High Peaks are inside the Blue Line.

== History ==
The area was used by the Mahican and Esopus Native Americans primarily for hunting. Later it was heavily exploited by the Dutch, English, Irish, and Germans; local industry included logging, bluestone quarrying, leather tanning, wintergreen and blueberry harvesting, trapping, fishing, and later, tourism. The old-growth hemlock and northern hardwood forests on the steep mountainsides and remote valleys were sufficiently inaccessible that they survived the logging, tanbarking and charcoal industries of the 18th and 19th centuries.

Inhabitants of the region often tell visitors the Park was created to protect New York City's water resources. However, the park itself was created 30 years before the first reservoir (Ashokan) was built, before the city had started looking north to fulfill its growing water needs.

In 1885, as the state legislature was considering the bill that created the Adirondack Park, Ulster County was trying to get out of paying delinquent property taxes that, under the law passed over its objections six years earlier, it owed the state. The lands, mostly around Slide Mountain had come into the county's possession when loggers looking to extract tannin for use in tanning leather from the bark of the many Eastern hemlocks growing there at the time, took the trees, made their money and then left the region without paying taxes.

The lands left behind were, if still good quality, often snapped up for use as private hunting and fishing clubs for wealthy businessmen from outside the region, whose determined enforcement of trespassing and poaching laws stirred resentment among the local populace long accustomed to the food provided by those lands; the lesser quality lands were wasted, producing nothing except destructive fires.

A team of forest experts, led by Harvard professor Charles Sprague Sargent, had visited the region when the original Forest Preserve bill was being studied and recommended against including the Catskills in its protections, as its forests "guard only streams of local influence," unlike the Adirondacks, whose preservation was motivated by a desire on the part of the state's businessmen to prevent the Erie Canal from silting up and thus becoming unnavigable.

At the same time Ulster had lost a lawsuit against the state and had been ordered to pay the back taxes. Two Assemblymen from the county (one of whom, Cornelius Hardenbergh, was a descendant of Johannes Hardenbergh, the original crown grantee of much of the Catskills in 1708) who had been elected because of their firm stands against paying the taxes, lobbied their fellow legislators heavily to pass a second version of the Forest Preserve Act, one that not only forgave the county's tax debt in exchange for the lands at issue, but required that the state would henceforth pay whatever local property taxes were required on the land as if they were intended for commercial use (i.e., logging). That provision was later applied to the Adirondacks as well; it remains in force today and makes the difference between survival and insolvency for many towns and other local governmental entities in both parks.

As the timber industry kept making determined efforts to undermine the bill, its original sponsors took the occasion of New York adopting a new constitution in 1894 to enshrine it in that document, with language that plugged all the loopholes that loggers and officials on the state's Forest Preserve Advisory Board had been using. Article 14 has survived several other major constitutional revisions.

=== Blue Line ===
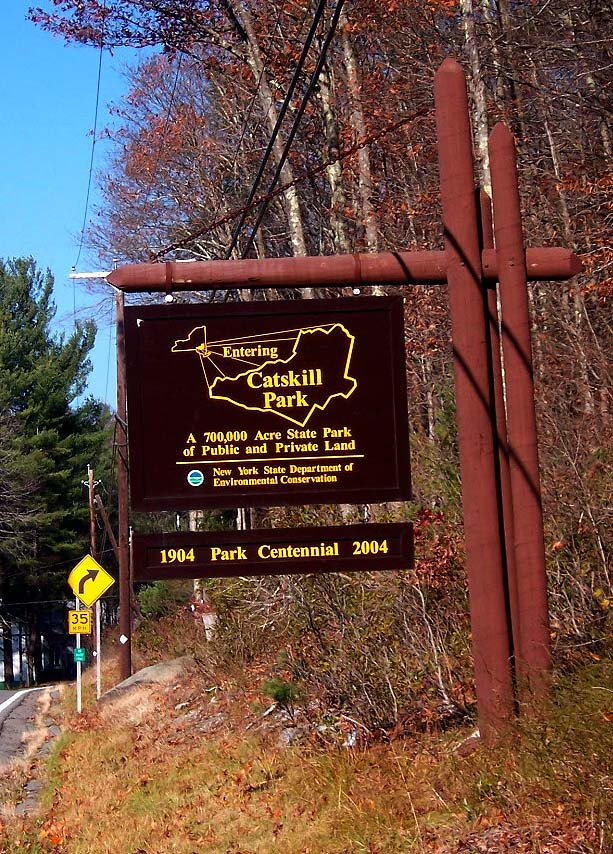
Sign at entry to Catskill Park near southern end, along NY 55 near Napanoch.

The park's creation meant an increase in state resources focused on the region. First came fire protection, a move greatly welcomed by the local governments and one that was to make a long-lasting impact on the region, as fire towers were built on a number of summits and patrols were regularly made along railroad lines to catch cinder fires before they got too big.

It also changed the way the region was seen by visitors. An era dominated by hotels such as the Catskill Mountain House at North-South Lake which catered to the well-to-do and socially prominent was passing its prime, and in its place outdoor recreationists were becoming interested in dry-fly fishing the trout streams, hunting and hiking the mountains.

In 1892, the state spent $250 to build a trail up Slide Mountain, which had only recently been proven by Arnold Henry Guyot to be the range's highest peak and was thus attracting a great deal of tourist interest. It would be the first hiking trail built at public expense in New York's Forest Preserve, and is still the most heavily used route up the mountain today.

That year had also seen the delineation of the Adirondack Park to the north, as the state sought to focus its land-acquisition efforts, by designating particular towns for inclusion, drawing a line in blue ink around them, a custom that continues on all official state maps today.

Twelve years later, in 1904, it was decided to do the same with the Catskills. But this Blue Line used not existing municipal boundaries but the old Hardenbergh Patent survey lots, watercourses and railroad rights-of-way, creating a finer, more focused park that gave some of the towns on its periphery areas where they could be assured land would not be subject to Article 14. A similar revision would follow suit in the Adirondacks, and future expansions of both parks would follow this model.

In 1912 the law was again amended to say that the Catskill Park consisted of all lands within the Blue Line, not just those owned by the state.

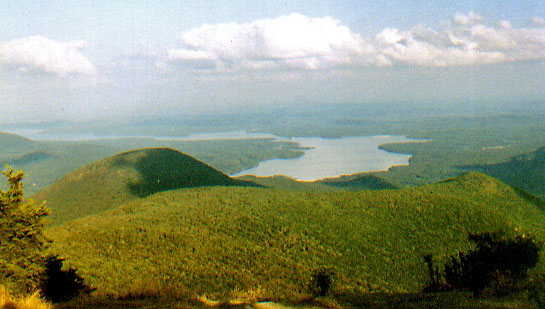
The Ashokan Reservoir as seen from Wittenberg Mountain.

=== Construction of the reservoirs ===
Shortly afterwards, a new section was added to Article 14 to allow the construction of reservoirs on up to three percent of the total land in each park. The City of Greater New York, having merged in 1898, began looking for new water resources the very next year, and its existing system of reservoirs in the city and Westchester County would not be able to keep up with demand for much longer. The city at first turned to land in Rockland County now part of Harriman State Park, but found a group of speculators called the Ramapo Water Company had beaten them to the water rights. It was thus essential to go even further north, and only in the Catskill Park could it find the land to condemn around Esopus Creek and create the Ashokan Reservoir.

In 1905 the state approved the creation of water supply commissions at various local governmental levels, as well as one at the state level to resolve disputes, like the one rapidly brewing between the city and the Catskill communities over its plan to condemn land for the construction of two reservoirs, Ashokan and what is now Schoharie Reservoir, plus the Shandaken Tunnel to connect the two.

The city prevailed, and construction of Ashokan began the next year, requiring the removal of several small hamlets and many residents in the process (some, such as Shokan, West Shokan and Olive Bridge, survive on its banks). The Esopus was dammed in 1913 and started sending water to the city two years later. Land claims continued to be resolved in area courts until 1940. It was the first of several city reservoirs in and around the park.

=== Mid-20th century ===
For the next 50 years, within the Blue Line, the state continued to acquire land (first through the State Parks Council and successor agencies, later through the Conservation Department). As time and money permitted, the state developed trails, lean-tos and towers in a piecemeal manner.

Bond issues approved by voters in 1916 and 1924 for a total of $12.5 million led ultimately to the addition of 121,000 acres (49,000 ha; 490 km^{2}) to the state's holdings. The economic collapse of the late 1920s and 1930s made a lot of desirable land available at low prices, and with the notably aggressive Robert Moses in charge of the state parks, valuable properties like the Devil's Path Range, the summit of Slide Mountain and Windham High Peak became part of the Forest Preserve.

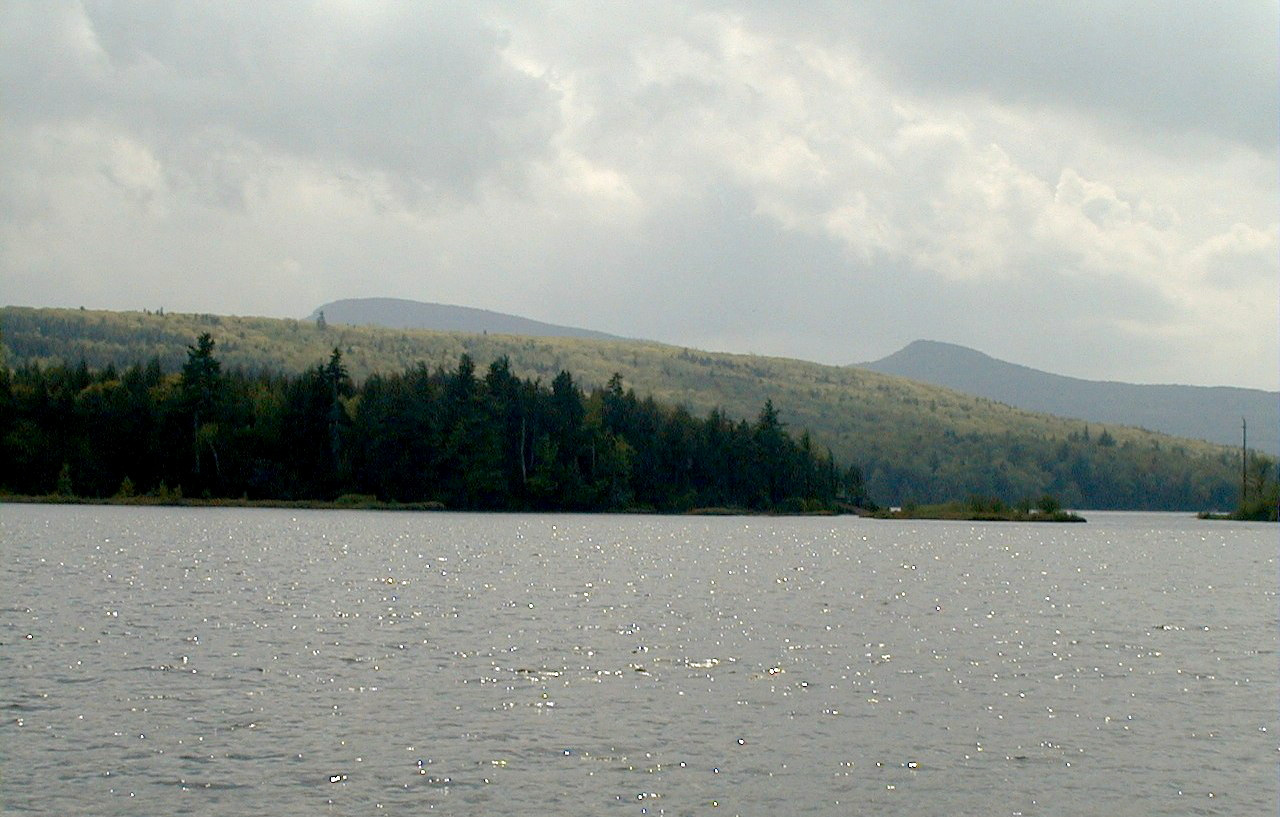
North-South Lake in the Catskill Forest Preserve

From 1926 to 1931 the state opened its first four public campgrounds within the park. New Deal programs during the Great Depression such as the Civilian Conservation Corps made labor available to build trails and replant forests. The state's Conservation Commission was able to compile the first of a series of "Catskill Trails" booklets.

However, the trails built by the state rapidly fell into disuse, Raymond H. Torrey would note by the end of the decade as what hikers there were tended to bypass the Catskills in favor of the Adirondacks and higher peaks in northern New England. Unlike those regions, no lasting organizations of hikers and other passive outdoor recreationists were ever formed around the Catskills (a brief attempt to create a Catskill Mountain Club in the late 1920s sputtered out after a few years). The New York - New Jersey Trail Conference now updates and maintains many of the trails in Catskill Park, including many around Slide Mountain (Ulster County, New York).

The most important change during this time period was the amending of Article 14, in 1948 to allow for the construction of Belleayre Mountain Ski Center and thus encourage skiers to come to the Catskills, following the lead taken in the Adirondacks by the creation of Whiteface and Gore ski areas. It remains in operation and several other private ski areas such as Hunter Mountain and Windham Mountain have followed its lead.

The construction of the Interstate 87 section of the New York State Thruway up the Hudson Valley, and the upgrading of Route 17 from a two-lane road into a freeway, along much of the park's southwestern border greatly increased access to the Park during the 1950s and '60s, although the latter encountered fierce opposition from trout fishermen over some of the original bridges along the Beaver Kill, which would have destroyed some favored holes.

New York City built three more reservoirs partially within the Park: Neversink, Rondout and Pepacton.

In 1957, the Blue Line had expanded to its present configuration, taking in not only the lands almost to the Kingston city limit and Thruway at the east, but more of Sullivan and Delaware counties in the west. Trails and other recreational resources remained underused, however. In 1966 the Catskill Mountain 3500 Club, a peak bagging organization, was formally incorporated after having existed informally for several years – the first organization devoted to, among other things, speaking for the Catskill hiking community. Three years later, in 1969, the Catskill Center for Conservation and Development was founded.

=== Temporary Commission and the Master Plan ===
By the early 1970s, the Borscht Belt era was ending, as the restrictions on Jewish guests at other hotels and resorts that had given rise to it fell victim to civil rights laws, and younger generations of Jews in any event felt more assimilated than their parents and grandparents had. In the wake of the Woodstock festival, the Catskills were among the many places whose campgrounds and trails began to see many backpacking enthusiasts of the counter-culture. Previously underused trails began to finally see serious usage, almost to the point of overuse.

On Earth Day in 1970, Governor Nelson Rockefeller signed legislation that recognized growing environmental concerns by combining the Conservation Department, which had been managing the Catskills and Adirondacks, with several other agencies to create the new Department of Environmental Conservation (DEC), which exists and manages the Forest Preserve to this day.

An idea that the Catskill Center had been pressing for was realized in 1973, when the state created a Temporary Commission to Study the Future of the Catskills, similar to one that it had set up in the Adirondacks. It took in as its area of study not just the Park but everywhere that could possibly be considered part of the Catskill region: all four counties of the Park, as well as Schoharie, Otsego and two towns in the southwestern corner of Albany County. It was the state's first-ever effort to look at what resources the Catskills had and what could be done with them. The Adirondack commission's recommendation for the establishment of a park-wide land use agency, the Adirondack Park Agency had been implemented in full, only to arouse great fury in that region as it issued zoning regulations far stricter than some towns had already enacted and mounted battles against longtime local residents over relatively small infractions. Catskills residents were worried that a similar solution awaited them.

While the commission considered the same recommendation for the Catskills, it ultimately decided against it in its final report in 1975 (it did try to promulgate a master land use plan, but that was rejected). What it did recommend was a master plan for the state land in the Forest Preserve, important since management was divided (and still is) between two different DEC regions, which had never been on the same page nor known what the other was doing.

It further recommended, following contemporary trends in public-land management (and a recommendation a special legislative committee had made back in 1960), that at least four of the growing tracts, or "management units" of Forest Preserve be formally designated as either wilderness areas or wild forests, again following a distinction drawn in the Adirondack Park. The former was similar in philosophy to those the federal government had already been designating in National parks and forests in the West, but slightly less restrictive; the latter is an even less restrictive category that exists only in New York's Forest Preserve and allows for greater human impact. The practical effects are discussed below under Management.

A Master Plan was developed and implemented in the early 1980s. DEC got busy finally clarifying what user groups (in addition to hikers, snowmobilers, horseback riders and cross-country skiers) were allowed on which trails, and marking them appropriately.

=== 1990s ===
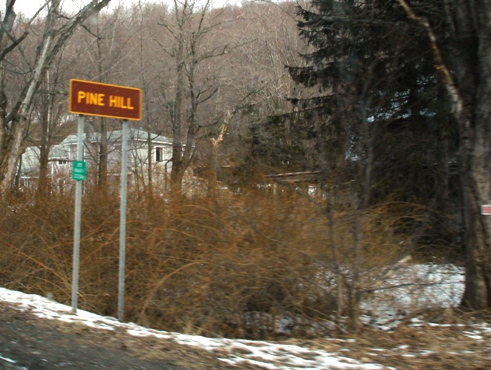
One of the Park's distinctive yellow and brown highway markers, showing the hamlet of Pine Hill

Advocates for the Catskills wanted to build an Interpretive Center, that would educate visitors about the park and its purpose, as a focus for regional tourism. This project was begun and pursued under the administration of Governor Mario Cuomo. A site was found on New York State Route 28 near the hamlet of Mount Tremper. It was cleared and roads were built to facilitate the eventual building. The Palisades Interstate Park Commission was to operate it (to get around the restrictions of Article 14) and the New York–New Jersey Trail Conference made plans to route the Long Path past it.

George Pataki, who had been elected governor in 1995, decided to put the project on hold citing financial considerations. The site, locally referred to as the "road to nowhere," was maintained, but had little to do except stop and picnic and follow the short nature trail that has been cut through the nearby woods.

Finishing the project was a cornerstone recommendation of DEC's 1999 Public Access Plan, which again followed an Adirondack lead and proposed ways to increase public knowledge and awareness of the Park's resources. Some were implemented (such as improving and extending the trail system, which occurred later that year when a trail across Mill Brook Ridge was completed as part of the Finger Lakes Trail, linking the trail network on the lesser peaks in the Delaware County section of the park with the long-established system in Ulster and Greene counties), some have not been.

Also in 1999, Governor Pataki designated most of the summits of the High Peaks as Bird Conservation Areas, in recognition of the importance of their boreal forests as summer habitat for Bicknell's thrush, only recently declared to be a separate species. It was the first such designation within either Forest Preserve, and the Adirondacks would this time be the one to follow suit a few years later.

=== Master Plan update ===
In 2003, DEC released its long-awaited draft update to the Master Plan. It would designate more of the wild forest areas as wilderness and establish some more rules for the use of wilderness, such as limits on group size.

The most controversial aspect, however, was its decision to limit mountain biking to designated trails and ban them from wilderness areas. While this had been done everywhere else where wilderness protection existed, mountain bikers and their organizations have lobbied hard for an exception, arguing that bicycles are not machines and do not deserve to be banned from use of the wilderness. DEC missed its target date of 2004, to coincide with the park's centennial celebrations, for the release of the final version. The revised master plan was adopted in August 2008.

The Interpretive Center project was completed and unveiled on July 1, 2015. A nature trail opened near the center in 2016.

== Climate ==
According to the Köppen climate classification system, the Catskill Mountains have two climate zones. The vast majority of the Catskills have a warm summer humid continental climate (Dfb) with some isolated locations in valleys with hot summer humid continental climate (Dfa). The plant hardiness zone on Slide Mountain at 4,180 ft (1,270 m) is 5a with an average annual extreme minimum temperature of -16.6 °F (-27.0 °C). The plant hardiness zone in Margaretville at 1,000 ft (300 m) is 5b with an average annual extreme minimum temperature of -10.6 °F (-23.7 °C)

Climate data for Phoenicia, Ulster County NY. Elevation: 900 ft (274 m)
Month	Jan	Feb	Mar	Apr	May	Jun	Jul	Aug	Sep	Oct	Nov	Dec	Year
Mean daily maximum °F (°C)	34.4 (1.3)	37.9 (3.3)	47.4 (8.6)	60.8 (16.0)	71.0 (21.7)	79.9 (26.6)	83.4 (28.6)	82.3 (27.9)	75.1 (23.9)	62.8 (17.1)	51.0 (10.6)	39.4 (4.1)	60.4 (15.8)
Daily mean °F (°C)	26.9 (−2.8)	29.1 (−1.6)	36.5 (2.5)	50.5 (10.3)	60.1 (15.6)	68.9 (20.5)	74.3 (23.5)	71.8 (22.1)	66.4 (19.1)	51.0 (10.6)	41.3 (5.2)	30.5 (−0.8)	49.4 (9.7)
Mean daily minimum °F (°C)	18.1 (−7.7)	20.0 (−6.7)	27.8 (−2.3)	40.5 (4.7)	51.4 (10.8)	57.9 (14.4)	62.9 (17.2)	61.0 (16.1)	56.3 (13.5)	42.6 (5.9)	32.9 (0.5)	22.9 (−5.1)	38.4 (3.6)
Average precipitation inches (mm)	3.6 (91)	3.98 (101)	3.82 (97)	4.0 (100)	3.9 (99)	3.2 (81)	2.6 (66)	2.9 (74)	3.02 (77)	3.6 (91)	3.7 (94)	3.5 (89)	46.33 (1,177)
Average relative humidity (%)	69.1	66.2	59.2	55.8	60.8	67.4	70.8	70.0	71.0	69.7	69.9	69.3	66.0
Source: PRISM Climate Group

Month	Jan	Feb	Mar	Apr	May	Jun	Jul	Aug	Sep	Oct	Nov	Dec	Year
Average Dew Point °F	16.2	17.7	24.3	34.3	48.6	57.8	63.2	61.7	55.8	41.9	32.2	22.1	38.9
Average Dew Point °C	−8.8	−7.9	−4.6	1.1	7.6	13.6	16.2	15.9	12.1	5.5	0.1	−5.5	3.8
Source: PRISM Climate Group

Climate data for Margaretville, Delaware County, NY. Elevation: 1,000 ft (300 m)
Month	Jan	Feb	Mar	Apr	May	Jun	Jul	Aug	Sep	Oct	Nov	Dec	Year
Mean daily maximum °F (°C)	34.8 (1.6)	38.3 (3.5)	47.7 (8.7)	61.0 (16.1)	71.4 (21.9)	80.1 (26.7)	83.8 (28.8)	82.4 (28.0)	75.4 (24.1)	63.0 (17.2)	51.5 (10.8)	39.8 (4.3)	60.8 (16.0)
Daily mean °F (°C)	27.1 (−2.7)	29.2 (−1.6)	36.9 (2.7)	50.0 (10.0)	60.2 (15.7)	69.0 (20.6)	74.4 (23.6)	71.9 (22.2)	66.6 (19.2)	51.4 (10.8)	41.8 (5.4)	30.8 (−0.7)	49.8 (9.9)
Mean daily minimum °F (°C)	18.4 (−7.6)	20.1 (−6.6)	28.0 (−2.2)	40.1 (4.5)	51.9 (11.1)	58.0 (14.4)	63.5 (17.5)	61.4 (16.3)	56.4 (13.6)	42.9 (6.1)	33.1 (0.6)	23.2 (−4.9)	38.8 (3.8)
Average precipitation inches (mm)	3.6 (91)	3.63 (92)	3.8 (97)	4.0 (100)	3.9 (99)	3.2 (81)	2.5 (64)	2.9 (74)	3.0 (76)	3.6 (91)	3.63 (92)	3.5 (89)	46.32 (1,177)
Average relative humidity (%)	68.5	64.3	58.5	55.8	61.6	67.4	70.9	70.2	71.7	69.9	68.5	69.8	66.0
Source: PRISM Climate Group

Month	Jan	Feb	Mar	Apr	May	Jun	Jul	Aug	Sep	Oct	Nov	Dec	Year
Average Dew Point °F	16.2	17.7	24.3	34.3	48.6	57.8	63.2	61.7	55.8	41.9	32.2	22.1	38.9
Average Dew Point °C	-8.8	-7.9	-4.6	1.1	7.6	13.6	16.2	15.9	12.1	5.5	0.1	-5.5	3.8
Source: PRISM Climate Group

== Management ==
Under the Master Plan, all state land in the Catskills is organized into contiguous management units falling under one of four categories: Wilderness, Wild Forest, Intensive Use or Administrative.

=== Wilderness ===
The pending Master Plan update would add much more land to this classification, the most restrictive, although slightly less so than those on federal lands.

New York's wilderness areas must be composed of 10,000 acres (4,000 ha; 40 km^{2}) of contiguous land, twice the federal standard. Land is to be left as "untrammeled by man" and as close to its natural state as possible, offering outstanding opportunities for solitude. No artificially-powered devices are permitted to be used in wilderness areas – chainsaws may only be used to clear trails with express written authorization from the DEC commissioner, and vehicle usage is forbidden in all save dire emergency circumstances. Most trails are single-track, avoiding old logging roads except at the lowest elevations. Designated campsites are kept to a minimum.

The goal of wilderness is to minimize human impact on the land as much as possible. Passive recreation such as hiking, hunting and birding is the main use of these lands.

Under the current Master Plan, many of the remaining tracts of first-growth forest, and many of the higher summits, are within wilderness areas.

Currently there are four: the Slide Mountain and Big Indian-Beaverkill wildernesses in Ulster County, and the Indian Head and West Kill wildernesses in Greene County. The updated Master Plan would add more wilderness in Greene County, most notably the Blackhead Range and Escarpment.

It has also been informal DEC policy to treat all lands in its possession in the Catskill Park above 3,100 feet (944 m) in elevation as de facto wilderness. The proposed update would not only make that rule official, it would extend it as much as possible to all land 2,700 feet (823 m) and higher.

=== Wild Forest ===
While still covered by the strictures of Article 14, Wild Forest areas are often lower in elevation and contain forest that has been more recently and historically disturbed, sometimes having been logged just prior to state acquisition. It is thus not as easy to avoid evidence of human impact as it is in wilderness, and consequently a higher impact is tolerated.

In Wild Forest areas, vehicles may be used as DEC designates. This has made them popular places for snowmobilers, cross-country skiers, and (in one area) mountain bikers (all-terrain vehicles remain banned, however). Hunters also find them desirable as the second- and third-growth forests in the area are more likely to contain deer and the carcass of the taken animal can be driven out of the woods instead of being walked out.

Some Wild Forest units exist with rather forced boundaries to allow for a use otherwise incompatible with a surrounding wilderness, such as the Overlook Mountain Wild Forest a corridor through the Indian Head Wilderness Area which contains the popular and still driveable dirt road to the fire tower atop the summit near Woodstock. A similar solution has been proposed under the new Master Plan to continue to allow more active use of the Hunter Mountain fire tower and the road leading up to it.

The Halcott Mountain Wild Forest is so designated only because it lacks enough contiguous area to qualify as wilderness.

Wild Forest areas besides those mentioned above include the Long Pond-Willowemoc in Sullivan County; the Touch-Me-Not, Cherry Ridge-Campbell Mountain and Dry Brook Ridge in Delaware County; the Balsam Lake, Bluestone, Lundy, Peekamoose Valley and Phoenicia-Mt. Tremper, Shandaken and Sundown in Ulster and the Blackhead, Colgate Lake, Hunter Mountain, Kaaterskill, North Point and Windham High Peak Wild Forests.

In addition to redesignating a good portion of those areas as wilderness, the proposed update would consolidate some into larger units (all the Delaware County properties, for instance).

=== Intensive use ===
Most of these areas save one, Belleayre Mountain Ski Center, are state campgrounds, meant for heavier, higher-impact use.

The campgrounds are generally far smaller units, with many sites and basic facilities available, sometimes abutting wilderness and wild forest areas, and paved roads offering easy vehicle access. North-South Lake, however, is a vast area (New York's largest public campground) including not only many sites but swimming areas at both lakes, the former Catskill Mountain House site at Pine Orchard and many of the historic trails around it.

Similarly, Belleayre's property extends well east of its ski trails and includes some of the hiking trails in the region as well.

Other campgrounds include Beaverkill, Devil's Tombstone, Kenneth L. Wilson, Mongaup Pond and Woodland Valley.

There are at least two Day Use Areas, within the park, one near Belleayre and the other at the Catskill Interpretive Center site. These are small tracts with picnic tables and sites where camping is forbidden, much as one would find in a small local park.

=== Administrative use ===
These are even smaller, unnamed plots that DEC is permitted to use for non-Forest Preserve purposes. Three, the Vinegar Hill Wildlife Management Area, the Simpson Ski Slope and the Catskill Mountain Fish Hatchery, which includes the DeBruce Environmental Education Camp, and the Esopus Creek Fish and Wildlife Management Parcel.

== Communities ==
Catskill Park encompasses 26 towns in 4 counties.

=== Counties ===
The park lands include portions of these counties:

- Delaware
- Greene
- Sullivan
- Ulster

=== Towns ===
- Andes (partially)
- Ashland
- Cairo (partially)
- Colechester
- Denning
- Durham
- Halcott (partially)
- Hardenburgh
- Hunter
- Hurley (partially)
- Jewett
- Kingston (partially)
- Lexington
- Marbletown (partially)
- Middletown (partially)
- Neversink (partially)
- Olive (partially)
- Prattsville (partially)
- Rochester (partially)
- Rockland (partially)
- Saugerties (partially)
- Shandaken
- Wawarsing (partially)
- Windham
- Woodstock

=== Villages ===
- Hunter
- Tannersville

The Ulster County hamlets of Phoenicia and Pine Hill, both within the park, were formerly villages.

== See also ==
- List of New York state parks
