= Cuddebackville, New York =

Hamlet in Orange County, New York, US

Cuddebackville
- Hamlet
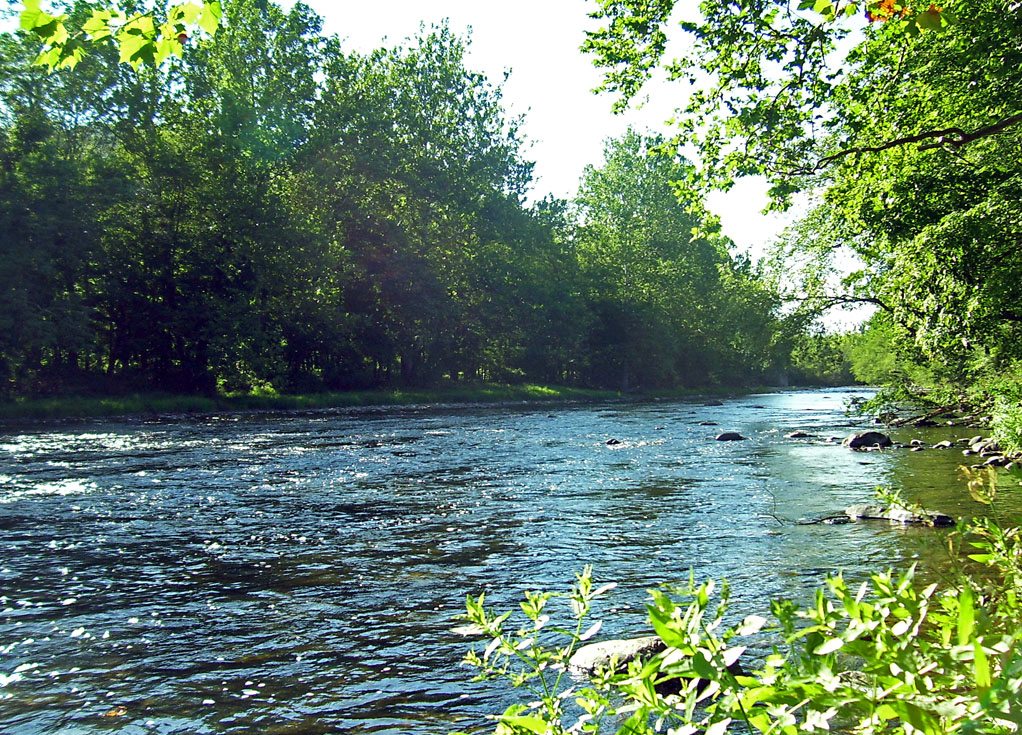
- The Neversink River in Cuddebackville

- Location within New York Location within the United States
- Coordinates: 41.4673°N 74.5937°W
- Country: United States
- State: New York
- County: Orange
- Town: Deerpark
- Named for: William Cuddeback
- Time zone: UTC-5 (EST)
  - Summer (DST): UTC-4 (EDT)
- ZIP Code: 12729

Cuddebackville is a hamlet in Deerpark, New York, in Orange County, New York, United States. Taking US-209, its location is about ten miles (16 km) north of Port Jervis. Cuddebackville is home of the Hamilton Bicentennial Elementary School, which is run by the Port Jervis City School District. This hamlet is also home of the Delaware and Hudson Railway Canal Park and the Neversink River Unique Area. The hamlet was named after William Cuddeback, a general from the War of 1812 and a descendant of the Cuddeback family, one of the first families to settle in the area.

The Cuddebackville Dam was a dam that was located in Cuddebackville, which was built in the 1820s and expanded on in 1903. In October 2004, the dam was removed by the Army Corps of Engineers to help aquatic life in the area.

According to the Census Bureau, the center of population in New York is located within the hamlet of Cuddebackville.

Cuddebackville also is the home of the global headquarters of the Falun Gong movement and the Shen Yun performance arts troupe.
