= Grahamsville, New York =

Grahamsville
- Hamlet and CDP
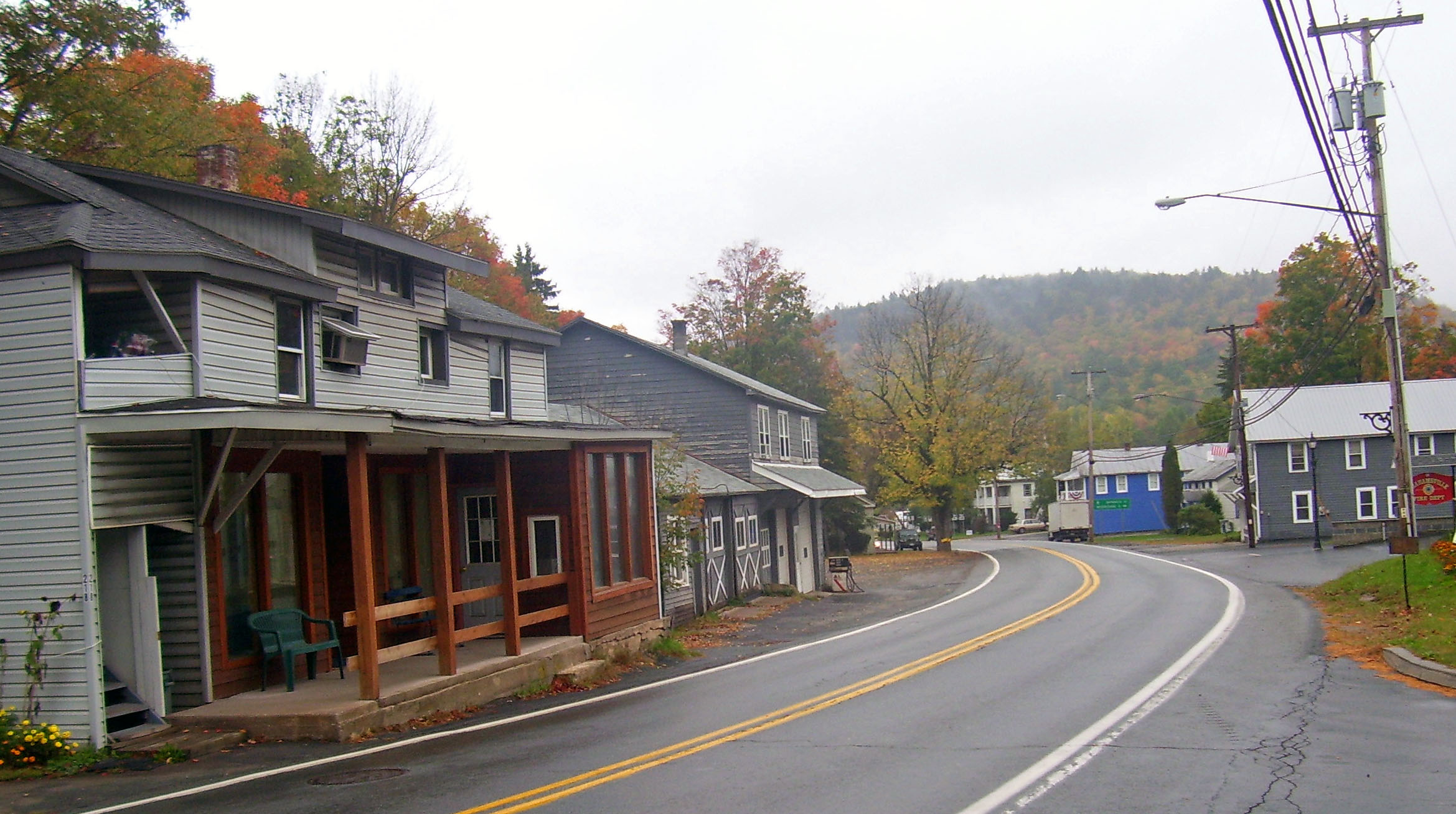
- Grahamsville, October 2007

- Location within the state of New York
- Coordinates: 41°50′46″N 74°32′41″W
- Country: United States
- State: New York
- County: Sullivan
- Elevation: 968 ft (295 m)
- Time zone: UTC-5 (Eastern (EST))
  - Summer (DST): UTC-4 (EDT)
- GNIS feature ID: 951468

Grahamsville is a hamlet (and census-designated place) at the junction of NY 42 and 55 in the Town of Neversink, in Sullivan County, New York, United States. As of the 2020 census, Grahamsville had a population of 360. It is near the western end of Rondout Reservoir, and is the southernmost community in the Catskill Park. It has the ZIP Code 12740 (also applied to the surrounding area) and the 985 telephone exchange in the 845 area code.

Grahamsville is located at latitude 41.848 and longitude -74.548. The elevation is 968 feet. Grahamsville is in the Eastern Time Zone.

Grahamsville in the town of Neversink, was long known in the area as being a "dry town" as the sale of alcohol was forbidden. On December 17, 2015, the first alcohol in over 80 years was legally served in Grahamsville at the Eureka Market & Café.

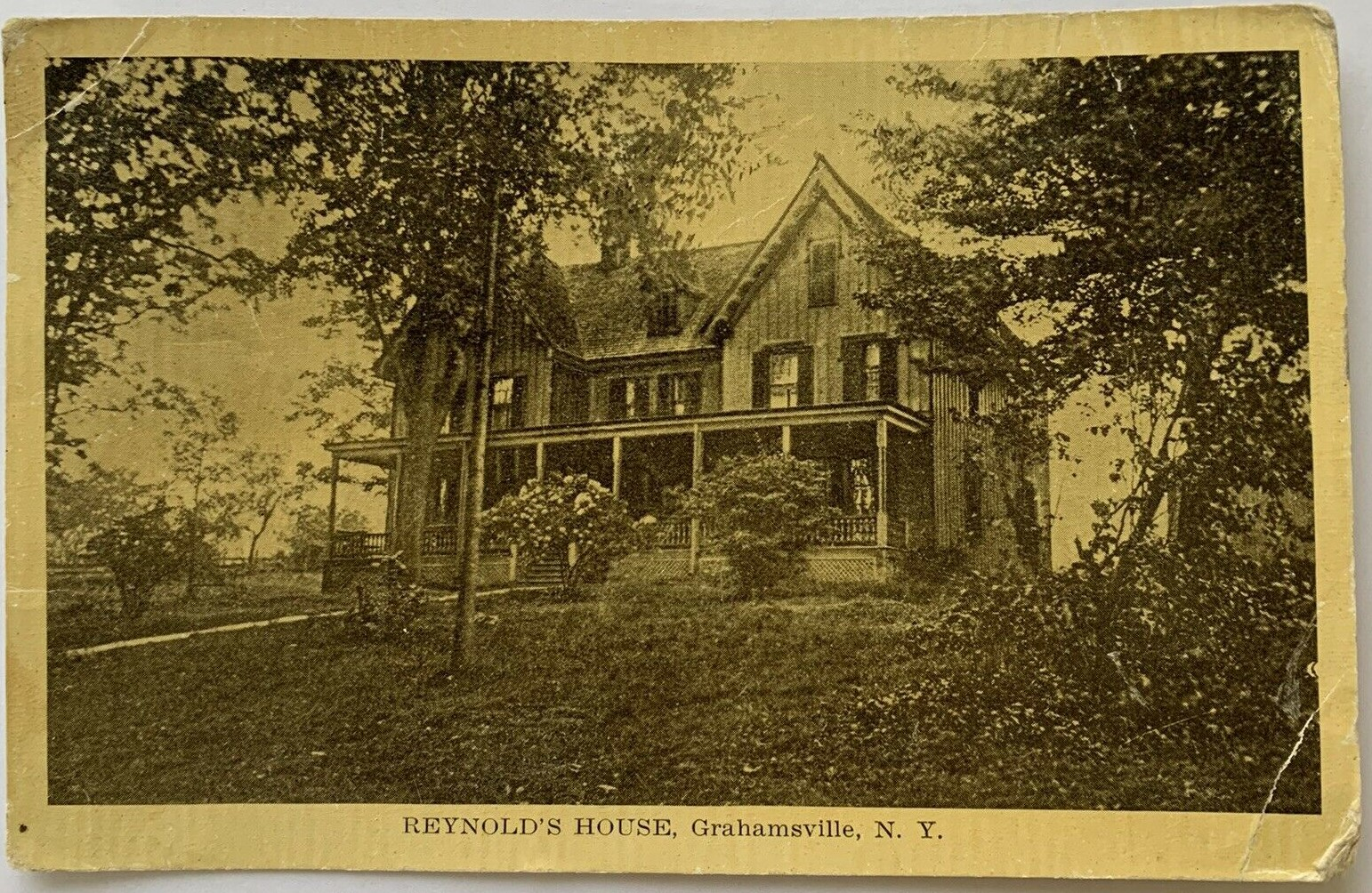
The 19th century Reynolds House is included in the town's historic district.

The center of Grahamsville, mainly located along Route 55 and Chestnut Creek west of Route 42, consists of the town hall, post office, fire department, and some other businesses, with an adjoining residential area. To the east of the junction is Tri-Valley Central School and the Grahamsville Historic District, listed on the National Register of Historic Places. Also listed on the National Register of Historic Places are the C. Burton Hotel and Levitz Family Farm. The Greenfield Preparative Meeting House was added in 2010. It is the largest developed area in the town of Neversink.

Grahamsville is also the location of the Grahamsville Little World's Fair. This annual event features rides, vendors, and events like "Grahamsville Idol". Since 1878, this county fair has taken place every year except for 1928 when a flood destroyed the bridge to the fairgrounds and the area where the fair is held every year, as well as 2020, when the COVID-19 pandemic prohibited large gatherings and the fair could not take place.

A Department of Environmental Protection branch was built in the heart of the town to increase the security near the Rondout and Neversink Reservoirs. These reservoirs are part of the water supply for New York City, so it is important that the environment in this region is safe from terrorism and any other kind of threat.

The buildings in the historic district reflect the early development of the community. The area was not settled permanently until after the American Revolutionary War due to a reputation for raids by the Native American population (the hamlet takes its name from the leader of a Continental Army unit killed nearby in 1778) and the manorial land ownership system that remained in some areas of the Hudson Valley through the 1840s. The church and homes in the historic district are what grew up around the western end of a stage road (today part of Route 55) to Wawarsing, nearby to the east in Ulster County.
