= Neversink Reservoir =

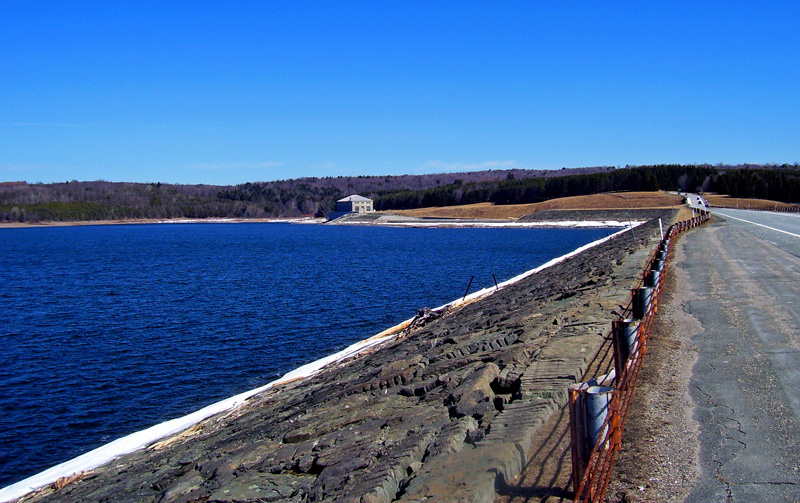
- South end, from the dam

- Location within New York Neversink Reservoir (the United States)
- Location: Sullivan County, New York
- Coordinates: 41°49′33″N 74°38′20″W
- Type: Reservoir
- Primary inflows: Neversink River
- Primary outflows: Neversink River, Neversink Tunnel
- Catchment area: 92 sq mi (240 km^{2})
- Basin countries: United States
- Max. length: 5 mi (8.0 km)
- Surface area: 1,539 acres (623 ha)
- Max. depth: 175 ft (53 m)
- Water volume: 34.9 billion U.S. gallons (132 million cubic meters)
- Surface elevation: 1,440 ft (439 m)

Neversink Reservoir is a reservoir in the New York City water supply system. It is located in the Catskill Mountain town of Neversink in Sullivan County, New York, 75 miles (121 km) northwest of the City.

It is fed by the Neversink River, the longest tributary of the Delaware River. Water collected in the reservoir in turn goes through the Neversink Tunnel a short distance east to Rondout Reservoir to be pooled with that from Pepacton and Cannonsville reservoirs which form the west-of-the-Hudson River components of the Delaware Aqueduct. Together, they provide nearly half of the city's daily consumption.

== History ==
The Neversink Reservoir was created as part of New York City's water supply expansion, requiring the flooding of two small towns in the Catskills. In 1941, the New York City Board of Water Supply selected the site to meet the city's growing demand for drinking water. The towns of Neversink and Bittersweet were condemned to make way for the project.

Neversink, founded in 1798, had a population of about 2,000 before its destruction. The town featured a main street, a church, a post office, a covered bridge, and a two-room schoolhouse. Bittersweet, a smaller nearby community, was also completely submerged. In 1953, the reservoir was filled, permanently covering the original settlements. While Neversink was relocated a few miles away, Bittersweet disappeared entirely.

=== Forged dam inspections controversy ===
In 2006, after residents raised concerns regarding the soundness of both Merriman and Neversink dams, a local newspaper obtained copies of inspection reports for both and found that the handwriting and information relating to the structural soundness of the dams on many of them over a three-year period was virtually identical, suggesting they had been routinely photocopied. Only variable information, such as weather and water elevation, changed in each report.

City and state officials promised to investigate the matter and discipline any employees involved in wrongdoing. Later several were suspended indefinitely without pay.

== Description ==
At full capacity, Neversink holds 34.9 billion US gallons (132,000,000 m^{3}). The upper Neversink drains a 92-square-mile (240 km^{2}) area (the smallest of any of the city's Catskill reservoirs) reaching all the way to Slide Mountain, the Catskills' highest peak, through six towns and two counties. It is 5 miles (8.0 km) long and reaches a maximum depth of 175 feet (53 m).

Neversink Dam is an earthen structure 2,820 feet (860 m) long and 195 feet (59 m) high. NY 55 travels across it.

The spillway elevation is 1,440 feet (440 m) above sea level, making it the highest city reservoir.

== Access and recreational use ==
Neversink is not as easily reached as some of the city's other Catskill reservoirs. NY 55 runs along its southern end, but that is the only road within proximity of any section. Access to the actual reservoir is tightly restricted and has been even more so since the September 11, 2001 attacks forced an increase in security.

Fishing is permitted in season with a DEP-issued permit in addition to the appropriate New York state license, and the reservoir is known, as with most Catskill fishing areas, for its trout. Fish species present in the lake include landlocked salmon, brown trout, yellow perch, smallmouth bass, smelt, chain pickerel, black bullhead, rock bass and pumpkinseed sunfish. Hunters with valid city and state permits may also use the lands around the reservoir where hunting is permitted during the season. Beyond those, however, no recreational use of the reservoir is permitted. While the land is not fenced off, the area is regularly patrolled by uniformed DEP police.

No motor boats are allowed on the reservoir; non-motorized boats that have been steam-cleaned and that have required tags may be used in the reservoir during the summer.
