= Rondout Reservoir =

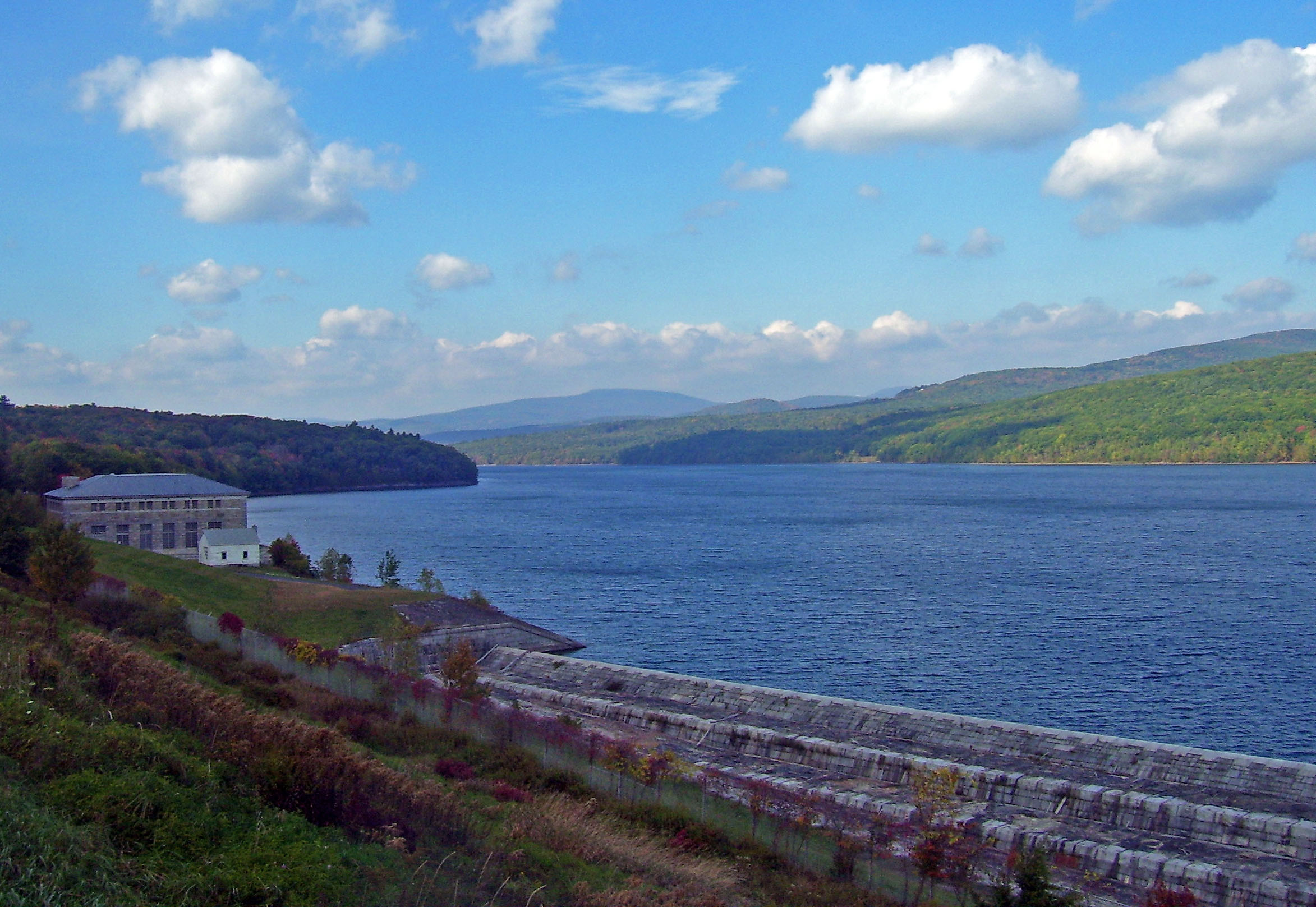
- Spillway at eastern end

- Location within New York Rondout Reservoir (the United States)
- Location: Catskill Mountains, Ulster / Sullivan counties, New York
- Coordinates: 41°49′21.36″N 74°28′15.6″W
- Type: reservoir
- Primary inflows: Rondout Creek
- Primary outflows: Delaware Aqueduct
- Basin countries: United States
- Max. length: 6.5 mi (10.5 km)
- Surface area: 2,052 acres (830 ha)
- Average depth: 73.8 ft (22.5 m)
- Water volume: 49.6 billion U.S. gallons (188 million cubic meters)
- Surface elevation: 837 ft (255 m)

Rondout Reservoir is a reservoir in New York City's water supply network. It is located 75 miles (121 km) northwest of the city in the Catskill Mountains, near the southern end of Catskill Park, split between the towns of Wawarsing in Ulster County and Neversink in Sullivan County. It is the central collection point for the city's Delaware System, which provides half its daily consumption.

== History ==
The reservoir was made possible by the construction of Merriman Dam along Rondout Creek. Construction began in 1937 and ended in 1954, three years after the reservoir began delivering water. It would be the first of four built by the city to satisfy its growing demand in the years after World War II. Three villages – Lackawack, Montela and Eureka – were condemned and flooded in the process. The small settlement of Grahamsville remains in existence just west of the reservoir.

In 1998, the city's Department of Environmental Protection (DEP) issued an advisory warning against eating more than one reservoir-caught smallmouth bass per month after mercury levels of 1.3 part per million (ppm), slightly above the federal standard of 1.0 ppm, were confirmed in three caught in the reservoir. Since there is no industry in the reservoir's vast watershed, this contamination is believed to be the result of acid rain from coal-fired power plants in the Midwest.

=== Forged dam inspections controversy ===
In 2006, after residents raised concerns regarding the soundness of both Merriman and Neversink dams following emergency repairs to Schoharie Dam, a local newspaper, the Times Herald-Record, obtained copies of weekly visual inspection reports for both and found that the handwriting and information relating to the appearance of the dams on weekly reports compiled by inspector Ronald Hewlett and initialed by section engineer Russell Betters over a three-year period were virtually identical, suggesting they had been routinely photocopied. The two were later suspended.

== Description ==
Rondout Reservoir is a single basin 6.5 miles (10.5 km) long, 2,052 acres (8.30 km^{2}) in area and reaches a maximum depth of 175 feet (53 m) near the dam. Mean depth is 73.8 feet (22.5 m). Elevation is 840 feet (260 m) above sea level.

It holds 49.6 billion US gallons (188,000,000 m^{3}), which comes not only from the reservoir's own 95 square-mile (247 km^{2}) watershed but from Cannonsville, Neversink, and Pepacton reservoirs via the Delaware and Neversink tunnels as well. Since those three are in the Delaware River watershed, Rondout is considered by the city's Department of Environmental Protection to be part of the Delaware system despite being firmly within the Hudson River watershed itself.

Combined, the four reservoirs account for 1,012 square miles (2,620 km^{2}) of watershed and 320.4 billion US gallons (1.213×10^{9} m^{3}) of capacity, 890 million US gallons (3,400,000 m^{3}) of which goes to the city daily — 50% of the entire system's capacity. All this water is fed from the Rondout to West Branch Reservoir in Putnam County via the Delaware Aqueduct, the world's longest continuous tunnel at 85 miles (137 km).

== Access and recreational use ==
Rondout is easy to reach via road as routes 55 and 55A form a loop around it. However, access to the actual reservoir is tightly restricted and has been even more so since the September 11, 2001 attacks forced an increase in security.

Fishing is permitted in season with a DEP-issued permit in addition to the appropriate New York state license, and the reservoir is known, as are most Catskill fishing areas, for its trout. However boats are not allowed to leave the reservoir for environmental reasons and must be stored near it year round. Hunters with valid city and state permits may also use the lands around the reservoir where hunting is permitted during the season. Beyond those, however, no recreational use of the reservoir is permitted. While the land is not fenced off, the area is regularly patrolled by uniformed DEP police.

== See also ==
- List of crossings of Rondout Creek
- List of dams and reservoirs in New York
