= Neversink, New York =

- Town
- Location of Neversink
- Coordinates: 41°51′22″N 74°35′43″W
- Country: United States
- State: New York
- County: Sullivan

Area
  - Total: 86.26 sq mi (223.42 km^{2})
  - Land: 82.77 sq mi (214.38 km^{2})
  - Water: 3.49 sq mi (9.04 km^{2})
- Elevation: 1,499 ft (457 m)

Population (2020)
  - Total: 3,366
  - Density: 40.67/sq mi (15.70/km^{2})
- Time zone: UTC-5 (Eastern (EST))
  - Summer (DST): UTC-4 (EDT)
- ZIP code: 12765
- Area code: 845
- FIPS code: 36-49847
- GNIS feature ID: 0979252

Neversink is a town in Sullivan County, New York, United States. The population was 3,366 at the 2020 census.

The Town of Neversink is in the northeastern corner of the county. The Neversink River that flows through the town is claimed to be the birthplace of American fly fishing.

== History ==
The town was formed in 1798 from the Town of Rochester in Ulster County, New York before Sullivan County was formed, on the site of the Neversink Reservoir. The Town of Rockland was created from part of Neversink in 1809, and part of Neversink was used to make the newer Town of Fallsburg in 1826.

In 1941, the New York City Board of Water Supply selected the site to meet the city's growing demand for drinking water. The town was condemned, along with nearby Bittersweet, to make way for a reservoir. At the time the town had a population of about 2,000. It featured a main street, a church, a post office, a covered bridge, and a two-room schoolhouse. The town had relocated a couple of miles by the time the reservoir was completed and put to use in 1953, turning the name of the old town ironic in the process.

In 2015 the town partially lifted its ban on the sale of alcohol in restaurants but retained the ban on sales in convenience stores. A total ban had been in effect since 1935.

== Geography ==
Part of the town is in the Catskill Park. The northern and eastern town lines are on the border of Ulster County.

According to the United States Census Bureau, the town has a total area of 86.4 square miles (224 km^{2}), of which 82.9 square miles (215 km^{2}) is land and 3.5 square miles (9.1 km^{2}) (3.99%) is water.

== Demographics ==
=== 2020 ===
As of the 2020 census, there were 3,366 people, 1,472 households, and 854 families residing in the town.

Historical population
Census	Pop.	Note	%±
1820	1,380		—
1830	1,258		−8.8%
1840	1,681		33.6%
1850	2,281		35.7%
1860	2,486		9.0%
1870	2,458		−1.1%
1880	2,152		−12.4%
1890	2,013		−6.5%
1900	2,039		1.3%
1910	1,743		−14.5%
1920	1,609		−7.7%
1930	1,256		−21.9%
1940	1,494		18.9%
1950	1,465		−1.9%
1960	1,565		6.8%
1970	2,055		31.3%
1980	2,840		38.2%
1990	2,951		3.9%
2000	3,556		20.5%
2010	3,557		0.0%
2020	3,336		−6.2%
U.S. Decennial Census 2020

=== 2000 ===
As of the census of 2000, there were 3,553 people, 1,346 households, and 1,008 families residing in the town. The population density was 42.8 inhabitants per square mile (16.5/km^{2}). There were 1,960 housing units at an average density of 23.6 per square mile (9.1/km^{2}). The racial makeup of the town was 96.93% White, 0.56% African American, 0.23% Native American, 0.23% Asian, 0.65% from other races, and 1.41% from two or more races. Hispanic or Latino of any race were 2.20% of the population.

There were 1,346 households, out of which 35.7% had children under the age of 18 living with them, 61.3% were married couples living together, 9.3% had a female householder with no husband present, and 25.1% were non-families. 21.0% of all households were made up of individuals, and 8.7% had someone living alone who was 65 years of age or older. The average household size was 2.64 and the average family size was 3.06.

In the town, the population was spread out, with 28.1% under the age of 18, 5.6% from 18 to 24, 28.7% from 25 to 44, 25.4% from 45 to 64, and 12.2% who were 65 years of age or older. The median age was 38 years. For every 100 females, there were 96.1 males. For every 100 females age 18 and over, there were 95.4 males.

The median income for a household in the town was $45,174, and the median income for a family was $55,075. Males had a median income of $40,744 versus $22,031 for females. The per capita income for the town was $19,260. About 8.7% of families and 11.3% of the population were below the poverty line, including 14.3% of those under age 18 and 13.7% of those age 65 or over.

== Communities and locations in Neversink ==
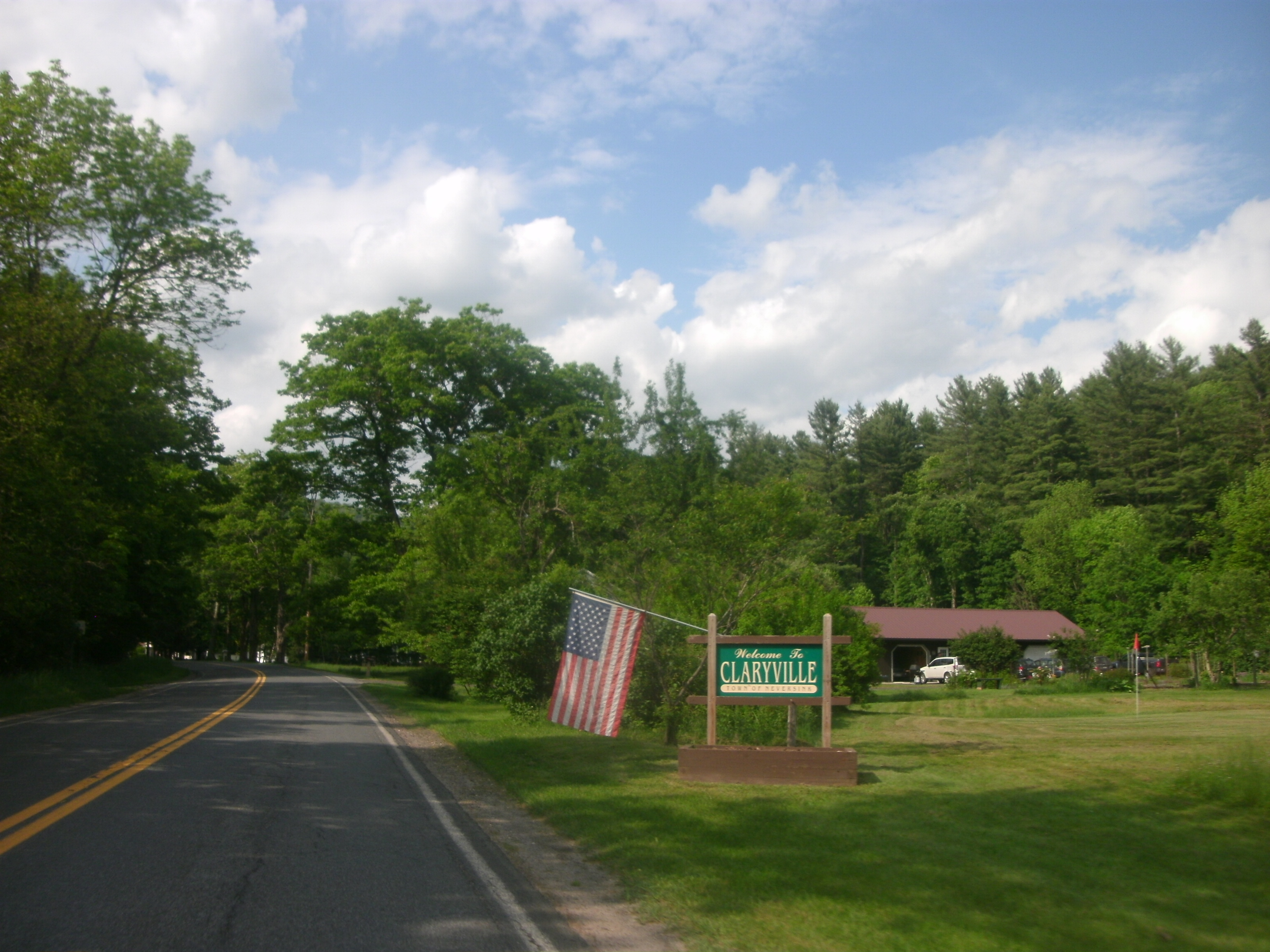
Entering the hamlet of Claryville as seen from northbound County Route 19

- Aden – A hamlet in the northern part of the town.
- Bittersweet – A community lost when the Neversink reservoir was constructed.
- Bradley – A hamlet on the southwestern side of the Neversink Reservoir, on the border of the Town of Liberty.
- Claryville – A hamlet by the northern town line.
- Curry – A hamlet west of Unionville.
- Eureka – A community now covered by the Rondout Reservoir.
- Grahamsville – A hamlet east of Neversink village, near the Rondout Reservoir.
- Lowes Corners – A location north of the Rondout Reservoir.
- Neversink – The hamlet of Neversink was built above the reservoir after the original community, also known as "Neversink Flats", was inundated by the Neversink Reservoir. The community is on Route 55.
- Neversink Reservoir – A reservoir centrally located in the town.
- Rondout Reservoir – A reservoir partly in the eastern area of the town.
- Unionville – A hamlet west of Grahamsville.
- Willowemoc – A hamlet, formerly called "Willowcanoe", near the western town line.

== Notable person ==
- Conor Crickmore (born 1970), American farmer, educator, and tool designer
