= National Register of Historic Places listings in Sullivan County, New York =

Location of Sullivan County in New York

List of the National Register of Historic Places listings in Sullivan County, New York

This is intended to be a complete list of properties and districts listed on the National Register of Historic Places in Sullivan County, New York. The locations of National Register properties and districts showing latitude and longitude coordinates may be seen in a map by clicking on "Map of all coordinates". The Delaware and Hudson Canal, which runs through this and other counties, is further designated a U.S. National Historic Landmark.

This National Park Service list is complete through NPS recent listings posted February 27, 2026.

Contents: Counties in New York
Albany (Albany) – Allegany – Bronx – Broome – Cattaraugus – Cayuga – Chautauqua – Chemung – Chenango – Clinton – Columbia – Cortland – Delaware – Dutchess (Poughkeepsie, Rhinebeck) – Erie (Buffalo) – Essex – Franklin – Fulton – Genesee – Greene – Hamilton – Herkimer – Jefferson – Kings – Lewis – Livingston – Madison – Monroe (Rochester) – Montgomery – Nassau – New York (Below 14th Street, 14th to 59th Streets, 59th to 110th Streets, Above 110th Street, Islands) – Niagara (Niagara Falls) – Oneida – Onondaga (Syracuse) – Ontario – Orange – Orleans – Oswego – Otsego – Putnam – Queens – Rensselaer – Richmond – Rockland – St. Lawrence – Saratoga – Schenectady – Schoharie – Schuyler – Seneca – Steuben – Suffolk – Sullivan – Tioga – Tompkins – Ulster – Warren – Washington – Wayne – Westchester (Northern, Southern, New Rochelle, Peekskill, Yonkers) – Wyoming – Yates

== Listings county-wide ==
	Name on the Register	Image	Date listed	Location	City or town	Description
1	All Souls' Church Summer Camp Historic District		July 31, 2023 (#100009170)	221 O'Keefe Hill Rd. 41°51′00″N 74°46′04″W	Parksville	
2	Anshei Glen Wild Synagogue	Anshei Glen Wild Synagogue	January 15, 1999 (#98001618)	Glen Wild Road; 41°39′00″N 74°35′20″W	Glen Wild	1923 synagogue built and still owned by local family. Has never had its own rabbi.
3	Agudas Achim Synagogue	Agudas Achim Synagogue	November 19, 1998 (#98001404)	Rock Ave. 41°54′03″N 74°49′28″W	Livingston Manor	1924 synagogue built at unusual angle, shows influence of local churches with lancet arch windows
4	Arlington Hotel	Arlington Hotel	March 31, 1983 (#83001806)	Main St. 41°36′30″N 75°03′40″W	Narrowsburg	
5	B'nai Israel Synagogue	B'nai Israel Synagogue	January 15, 1999 (#98001620)	NY 52; 41°45′29″N 74°36′08″W	Woodbourne	
6	Beaverkill Covered Bridge	Beaverkill Covered Bridge	October 3, 2007 (#07001038)	CR 30 over Beaverkill Cr. 41°58′53″N 74°50′12″W	Beaverkill	1865 covered bridge was one of earliest crossings of river in remote, unsettled area of Catskills. Some uncertainty as to who actually built it. Unusual variant on Ithiel Town-patented design.
7	Bennett Family House	Bennett Family House	December 28, 2001 (#01001400)	11 Hamilton Ave. 41°39′20″N 74°40′58″W	Monticello	
8	Bikur Cholim B'nai Israel Synagogue	Bikur Cholim B'nai Israel Synagogue	January 15, 1999 (#98001619)	Old White Lake Turnpike at NY 55; 41°42′54″N 74°47′59″W	Swan Lake	
9	Bloomingburg Reformed Protestant Dutch Church	Bloomingburg Reformed Protestant Dutch Church	January 10, 1980 (#80002779)	NY 17M; 41°33′21″N 74°26′34″W	Bloomingburg	1821 church is local landmark and one of the oldest churches in the county. Currently being prepared for use as a historical museum.
10	Broadway Historic District	Broadway Historic District	January 30, 2020 (#100004915)	Broadway, Liberty, Bank, North, Jones, Pleasant & St. John Sts. and Landfield Ave. 41°39′19″N 74°41′19″W	Monticello	Historic core of county seat
11	C. Burton Hotel	C. Burton Hotel	March 16, 2005 (#05000171)	450 Main St. 41°51′11″N 74°33′09″W	Grahamsville	1851 hotel is possibly the only surviving Greek Revival building in county with columns and a ballroom.
12	Ellery Calkins House	Ellery Calkins House	November 27, 1992 (#92001595)	Co. Rd. 114, E of Delaware R. Bridge; 41°42′27″N 75°03′50″W	Cochecton	
13	Callicoon Downtown Historic District	Callicoon Downtown Historic District	June 21, 2016 (#16000390)	Main Sts, Highview & Mitchell Aves., River & Hospital Rds., Bridge St., and NY 97; 41°45′59″N 75°03′26″W	Callicoon	Core of riverside community that grew up around 1848 railroad station
14	Callicoon Methodist Church and Parsonage	Callicoon Methodist Church and Parsonage	November 4, 1993 (#93001134)	Church St. (NY 97) S of jct. with Seminary Rd., Town of Delaware; 41°46′00″N 75°03′20″W	Callicoon	
15	Callicoon National Bank	Callicoon National Bank	February 18, 1994 (#94000048)	133 Main St. 41°45′58″N 75°03′32″W	Callicoon	
16	Center Theatre	Center Theatre	February 23, 2001 (#01000170)	NY 52; 41°45′30″N 74°36′08″W	Woodbourne	
17	Chevro Ahavath Zion Synagogue		January 28, 1999 (#98001621)	Cold Spring Rd. 41°36′42″N 74°40′38″W	Monticello	
18	Cochecton Center Methodist Episcopal Church	Cochecton Center Methodist Episcopal Church	April 21, 2000 (#00000343)	Skipperdine Rd. 41°39′21″N 74°59′05″W	Cochecton Center	
19	Cochecton Presbyterian Church	Cochecton Presbyterian Church	November 27, 1992 (#92001597)	Co. Rd. 114, E of Delaware R. Bridge; 41°42′25″N 75°03′52″W	Cochecton	
20	Cochecton Railroad Station	Cochecton Railroad Station	March 16, 2005 (#05000172)	NY 97; 41°43′04″N 75°02′46″W	Cochecton	
21	Delaware and Hudson Canal	Delaware and Hudson Canal	November 24, 1968 (#68000051)	Delaware and Hudson Canal	Minisink	
22	Delaware Aqueduct	Delaware Aqueduct	November 24, 1968 (#68000055)	Between Minisink Ford, NY and Lackawaxen, PA; 41°28′57″N 74°58′37″W	Minisink Ford	Oldest wire suspension bridge in the U.S.; design precedent for Brooklyn Bridge; extends into Pike County, Pennsylvania
23	Drake-Curtis House	Drake-Curtis House	April 19, 1993 (#92001598)	Co. Rd. 114, E of NY 97; 41°42′32″N 75°03′06″W	Cochecton	
24	Dundas Castle	Dundas Castle	March 21, 2001 (#01000245)	Berry Brook Rd. 41°58′46″N 74°52′38″W	Roscoe	(be sure to link in article to Dundas Castle in Edinburgh, Scotland)
25	Ferndale School	Ferndale School	January 5, 2005 (#04001437)	Upper Ferndale Rd. and Ferndale Loomis Rd. 41°46′36″N 74°44′29″W	Ferndale	
26	First Methodist Episcopal Church of Parksville	First Methodist Episcopal Church of Parksville	May 30, 2001 (#01000575)	10 Short Ave. 41°51′21″N 74°45′32″W	Parksville	
27	Forestburgh Town Hall	Forestburgh Town Hall	May 11, 2011 (#11000278)	305 County Road 48; 41°32′28″N 74°43′30″W	Forestburgh vicinity	New listing; refnum 11000278
28	German Presbyterian Church and Hortonville Cemetery	German Presbyterian Church and Hortonville Cemetery	January 15, 2003 (#02001712)	CR 121 and CR 131; 41°46′21″N 75°01′42″W	Hortonville	
29	Glen Wild Methodist Church	Glen Wild Methodist Church	May 10, 1984 (#84003035)	Old Glen Wild Rd. 41°39′58″N 74°35′18″W	Glen Wild	
30	Grahamsville Historic District	Grahamsville Historic District	December 6, 1979 (#79001634)	NY 55; 41°50′48″N 74°32′19″W	Grahamsville	Intact core of 19th-century Grahamsville, east of present hamlet's downtown, with buildings mostly intact
31	Greenfield Preparative Meeting House		November 29, 2010 (#10000956)	NY 55 at Denman Mountain Road; 41°51′16″N 74°33′16″W	Grahamsville	New listing; refnum 10000956
32	Hankins District No. One Schoolhouse		February 4, 2000 (#00000054)	Sullivan Cty Rd. 132; 41°48′59″N 75°04′58″W	Hankins	
33	Hankins Stone Arch Bridge	Hankins Stone Arch Bridge	July 27, 2000 (#00000838)	Sullivean Cty. Rd. 94, E. 41°48′59″N 75°05′31″W	Hankins	
34	Hart House		January 18, 2006 (#05001535)	50 Hamilton St. 41°35′14″N 74°22′50″W	Burlingham	
35	Hasbrouck House		September 13, 2019 (#100004419)	282 Hasbrouck Road; 41°47′33″N 74°37′02″W	Woodbourne	1815 stone house built by early settlers now used as community center
36	Hebrew Congregation of Mountaindale Synagogue	Hebrew Congregation of Mountaindale Synagogue	May 30, 2001 (#01000578)	NY 55; 41°41′18″N 74°31′51″W	Mountaindale	1917 synagogue is only one in county with its own mikvah
37	Hessinger Store		June 2, 2000 (#00000584)	Main St. (Co. Rd. 122); 41°50′10″N 74°56′51″W	Callicoon Center	Demolished 2011
38	Hillig Castle		October 29, 2021 (#100007082)	165 Castle Hill Rd. 41°49′27″N 74°44′10″W	Liberty vicinity	
39	Jeffersonville School	Jeffersonville School	April 28, 1988 (#88000519)	Terrace Ave. 41°46′48″N 74°56′25″W	Jeffersonville	
40	Jewish Center of Lake Huntington	Jewish Center of Lake Huntington	December 11, 2009 (#09001087)	13 County Road 116; 41°46′48″N 74°56′25″W	Lake Huntington	New listing; refnum 09001087
41	Jewish Community Center of White Sulphur Springs	Jewish Community Center of White Sulphur Springs	August 12, 1999 (#99000991)	Briscoe Rd. 41°47′56″N 74°49′52″W	White Sulphur Springs	
42	Kirk House		May 10, 1984 (#84003043)	Kirk's Rd. 41°36′27″N 75°03′26″W	Narrowsburg	
43	Levitz Family Farm		January 24, 2002 (#01001497)	395 Beaver Dam Rd. 41°47′51″N 74°32′00″W	Grahamsville	
44	Liberty Downtown Historic District	Liberty Downtown Historic District	May 26, 2006 (#06000266)	Main, Chestnut, Academy, School, Church, Maple, John, Edgar Sts., and Darbee Ln. 41°48′03″N 74°44′48″W	Liberty	
45	Liberty Village Historic District	Liberty Village Historic District	April 11, 1978 (#78001921)	N. Main, Academy, and Law Sts. 41°48′05″N 74°44′53″W	Liberty	
46	Loch Sheldrake Synagogue	Loch Sheldrake Synagogue	August 12, 1997 (#97000844)	NY 52, N of jct. of NY 52 and Loch Sheldrake Rd. 41°46′15″N 74°39′29″W	Loch Sheldrake	
47	Mamakating Park Historic District	Mamakating Park Historic District	November 19, 1998 (#98001393)	Roughly along Park Rd, Columbian Rd., and Mamakating Ave. 41°36′45″N 74°32′12″W	Wurtsboro	1890s Catskill ridgetop resort community, never fully realized
48	Manion's General Store	Manion's General Store	April 15, 2004 (#04000285)	52 Ferndale Rd. 41°46′26″N 74°44′22″W	Ferndale	
49	Anthony Manny House	Anthony Manny House	September 15, 2000 (#00000840)	6 Hankins Rd. 41°48′53″N 75°05′15″W	Hankins	
50	Masten-Quinn House	Masten-Quinn House	February 13, 2003 (#03000046)	59 First St. 41°34′37″N 74°28′52″W	Wurtsboro	1820s house of early farmer who took advantage of D&H Canal route through his land. Farmed until mid-20th century.
51	Milanville-Skinners Falls Bridge	Milanville-Skinners Falls Bridge	November 14, 1988 (#88002167)	Legislative Route 63027 over the Delaware River at Milanville; 41°40′10″N 75°03′31″W	Skinners Falls	Extends into Damascus Township in Wayne County, Pennsylvania
52	Minisink Battlefield	Minisink Battlefield	September 16, 1993 (#93000946)	Minisink Battleground Road (Co. Rd. 168) N of Minisink Ford; 41°29′15″N 74°58′19″W	Minisink Ford	Location of the Battle of Minisink during the American Revolution
53	Munson Diner	Munson Diner	April 12, 2006 (#06000256)	Lake St. (NY 55); 41°47′47″N 74°44′46″W	Liberty	
54	Narrowsburg Methodist Church	Narrowsburg Methodist Church	February 4, 2000 (#00000053)	Lake St. 41°36′18″N 75°03′45″W	Narrowsburg	
55	Ohave Shalom Synagogue	Ohave Shalom Synagogue	November 22, 2000 (#00001412)	Mauric Rose St. 41°42′38″N 74°34′23″W	Woodridge	1930 synagogue combines urban and Eastern European design traditions. Interior paintings are unique in county
56	Old Cochecton Cemetery	Old Cochecton Cemetery	November 27, 1992 (#92001593)	W of NY 97, N of jct. with Co. Rd. 114; 41°42′40″N 75°02′58″W	Cochecton	
57	Page House		November 27, 1992 (#92001601)	59 C. Meyer Rd. 41°41′01″N 75°02′53″W	Cochecton	
58	Parsonage Road Historic District	Parsonage Road Historic District	November 27, 1992 (#92001600)	Parsonage Rd. 41°42′31″N 75°03′40″W	Cochecton	
59	Pond Eddy Bridge	Pond Eddy Bridge	November 14, 1988 (#88002170)	LR 51013 over the Delaware River; 41°26′21″N 74°49′13″W	Lumberland	Extends into Pike County, Pennsylvania
60	Reformed Dutch Church of Mamakating		April 28, 2022 (#100007687)	134 Sullivan St. 41°34′35″N 74°29′09″W	Wurtsboro	
61	Reilly's Store	Reilly's Store	November 27, 1992 (#92001594)	Co. Rd. 114, W of jct. with NY 97; 41°42′30″N 75°03′45″W	Cochecton	
62	Rialto Theatre	Rialto Theatre	February 2, 2001 (#01000043)	Broadway; 41°39′20″N 74°41′17″W	Monticello	
63	Riverside Cemetery		November 18, 1993 (#93001226)	NY 97 SE of jct. with Church St. 41°50′50″N 75°07′36″W	Long Eddy	
64	Rivoli Theatre	Rivoli Theatre	January 26, 2001 (#00001691)	Jct. of NY 42 and Laurel Ave. 41°41′56″N 74°38′15″W	South Fallsburg	1923 theater, renovated in Art Deco style in 1937. Preserved nearly intact and still used by local theater group
65	Rockland Mill Complex		August 23, 1984 (#84003062)	Palen Pl. 41°56′56″N 74°54′52″W	Rockland	
66	Roscoe Presbyterian Church and Westfield Flats Cemetery	Roscoe Presbyterian Church and Westfield Flats Cemetery	June 8, 2001 (#01000574)	Old NY 17; 41°55′56″N 74°54′47″W	Roscoe	
67	St. James Church and Rectory	St. James Church and Rectory	November 4, 1993 (#93001135)	NY 17B N side, E of jct. with NY 97, Town of Delaware; 41°45′54″N 75°03′11″W	Callicoon	
68	St. John's Episcopal Church and Rectory	St. John's Episcopal Church and Rectory	November 21, 2002 (#02001359)	15 St. John's St. 41°39′12″N 74°41′12″W	Monticello	
69	St. Joseph's Seminary	St. Joseph's Seminary	July 8, 1993 (#93000582)	Seminary Rd. W side 41°46′12″N 75°03′29″W	Callicoon	
70	St. Paul's Evangelical Lutheran Church	St. Paul's Evangelical Lutheran Church	August 15, 1997 (#97000845)	24 Chestnut St. 41°47′56″N 74°44′50″W	Liberty	
71	Shelburne Playhouse		April 15, 2004 (#04000284)	Upper Ferndale Rd. 41°46′38″N 74°44′25″W	Ferndale	
72	Silver Lake Dam	Silver Lake Dam	June 2, 2000 (#00000585)	Silver Lake Rd. 41°42′06″N 74°33′03″W	Woodridge	1840s dam built to regulate Sandburg Creek for summit section of D&H Canal created Silver Lake, later recreational resource.
73	South Fallsburg Hebrew Association Synagogue	South Fallsburg Hebrew Association Synagogue	November 22, 2000 (#00001410)	North St. 41°42′25″N 74°37′51″W	South Fallsburg	Originally built in 1902, is one of oldest synagogues in county. Has full sukkah in basement.
74	Spring House	Spring House	December 2, 2009 (#09000970)	54 River Rd. 41°28′41″N 74°55′07″W	Barryville	New listing; refnum 09000970
75	Stone Arch Bridge	Stone Arch Bridge	December 12, 1976 (#76001285)	N of Kenoza Lake on NY 52; 41°44′53″N 74°57′15″W	Kenoza Lake	
76	Tefereth Israel Anshei Parksville Synagogue	Tefereth Israel Anshei Parksville Synagogue	August 12, 1999 (#99000990)	Dead End St. 41°51′28″N 74°45′45″W	Parksville	
77	Ten Mile River Baptist Church	Ten Mile River Baptist Church	May 9, 1997 (#97000422)	NY 97, jct. with Cochecton Trnpk. 41°33′36″N 75°01′00″W	Tusten	
78	Town and Country Building	Town and Country Building	September 24, 2004 (#04001061)	1 N Main St. 41°47′59″N 74°44′45″W	Liberty	
79	Tusten Stone Arch Bridge	Tusten Stone Arch Bridge	July 27, 2000 (#00000839)	Tusten Rd. at Ten Mile River; 41°33′22″N 75°01′10″W	Tusten	
80	Valleau Tavern	Valleau Tavern	November 27, 1992 (#92001599)	Jct. of Co. Rd. 114 and NY 97; 41°42′37″N 75°03′16″W	Cochecton	
81	Woodbourne Reformed Church Complex	Woodbourne Reformed Church Complex	November 7, 2003 (#03001120)	NY 42; 41°45′42″N 74°36′00″W	Woodbourne	
82	Woodstock Music Festival Site	Woodstock Music Festival Site	February 28, 2017 (#100000684)	Generally West Shore, Best, and Perry roads 41°42′05″N 74°52′49″W	Bethel	Farmland used for 1969 Woodstock music festival, a touchstone event of late 1960s counterculture
