= Callicoon (CDP), New York =

Callicoon, New York
- CDP
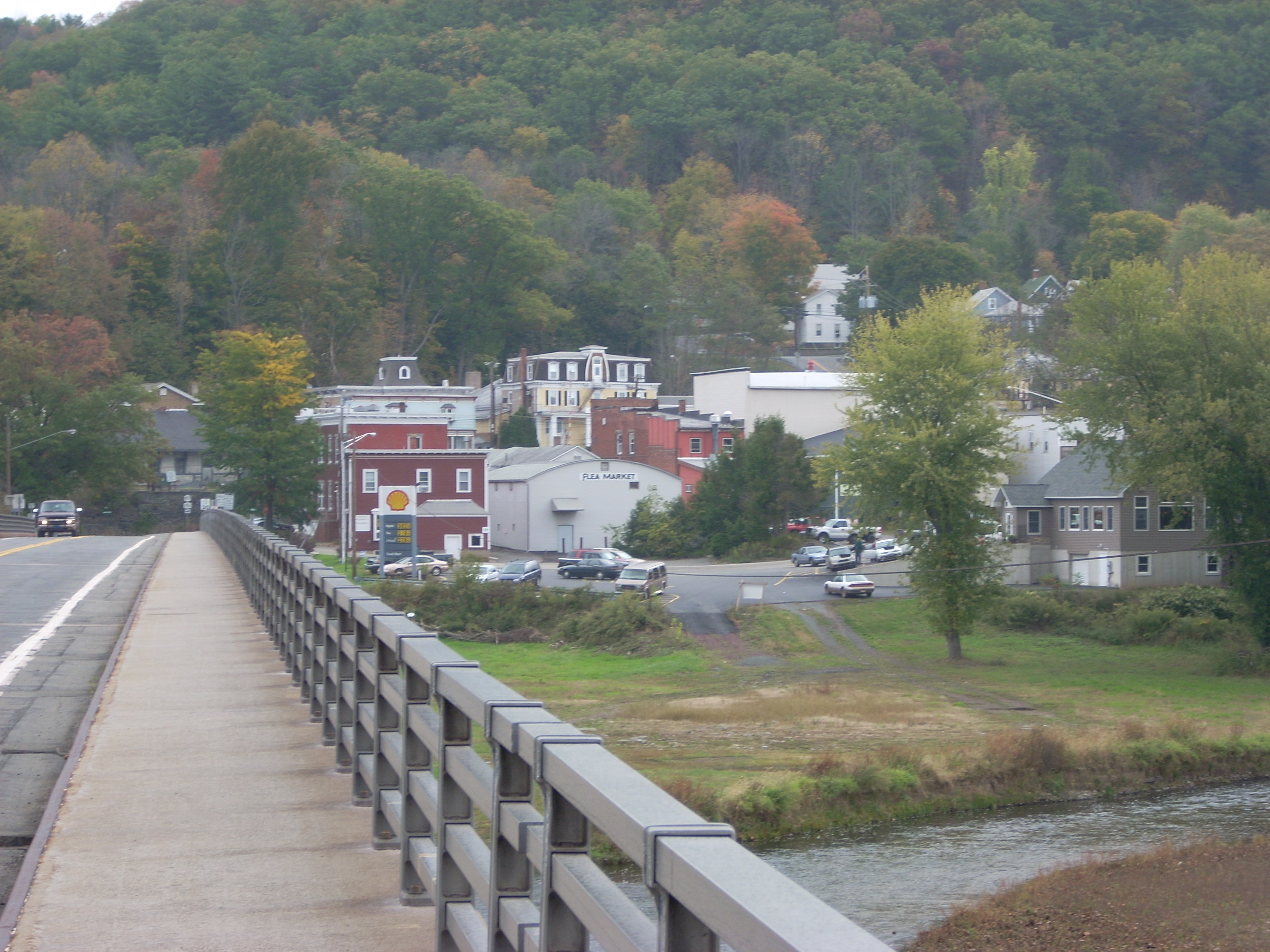
- Downtown Callicoon as seen from Pennsylvania across the Delaware River.

- Location of Callicoon (CDP) in Sullivan County, New York

- Location within the state of New York
- Coordinates: 41°45′57″N 75°3′31″W
- Country: United States
- State: New York
- County: Sullivan

Area
  - Total: 0.71 sq mi (1.84 km^{2})
  - Land: 0.62 sq mi (1.61 km^{2})
  - Water: 0.089 sq mi (0.23 km^{2})
- Elevation: 846 ft (258 m)

Population (2020)
  - Total: 206
  - Density: 331/sq mi (127.8/km^{2})
- Time zone: UTC-5 (Eastern (EST))
  - Summer (DST): UTC-4 (EDT)
- ZIP code: 12723
- Area code: 845
- FIPS code: 36-11748
- GNIS feature ID: 0945476

Callicoon is a hamlet and census-designated place in the Town of Delaware, Sullivan County, New York, United States. The population was 206 at the 2020 census.

Callicoon is in the western part of the county in the Town of Delaware and along the Delaware River.

== History ==
Callicoon got its name from Dutch hunters who settled in the location in the 1600s. Because of the population of wild turkeys in the area, they named the community "Kollikoonkill" which translates into Wild Turkey Creek. In addition to animal abundance, the area was a source for lumber and a transport center with the Delaware River offering access to coastal cities to the south and east. In the 1840s, the Erie Railroad added to transportation by passing through along the banks of the Delaware River to link the Great Lakes with the East Coast. Because of the train station's vital central location, the community was renamed Callicoon Depot.

In 1888, a major fire destroyed much of Callicoon's business district. The town quickly rebuilt, but lost much of its architectural history prior to the late 19th century. The community's economy also became badly damaged when railroad travel gave way to the automobile. The last scheduled passenger train left Callicoon on November 27, 1966. By the late 1960s, tourism took over as the main industry as campgrounds and canoes drew a new generation of visitors. Campgrounds and canoe liveries, followed by bed and breakfast inns, drew a new generation of vacationers. The Villa Roma Resort and Conference Center also opened, increasing the number of vacationers to the area. Additionally, the Upper Delaware Scenic and Recreational River was created in 1978 to protect the land of the scenic valley, maintain quality of the Delaware River and enforce environmental sensitivity in the area.

== Geography and location ==
Callicoon is located on the east bank of the Delaware River, adjacent to the Catskill Mountains in the southern portion of Upstate New York. The community lies approximately 55 miles (89 km) northeast of Scranton, Pennsylvania, 65 miles (105 km) southeast of Binghamton, 115 miles (185 km) northwest of New York, and 120 miles (190 km) southwest of Albany.

Callicoon is located at 41°45′56″N 75°3′31″W (41.765831, -75.058682).

According to the United States Census Bureau, the CDP has a total area of 0.5 square mile (1.2 km^{2}), of which, 0.4 square mile (1.0 km^{2}) is land and 0.1 square mile (0.2 km^{2}) (17.39%) is water.

== Demographics ==
Historical population
Census	Pop.	Note	%±
2020	206		—
U.S. Decennial Census

As of the census of 2000, there were 216 people, 94 households, and 61 families residing in the CDP. The population density was 565.1 inhabitants per square mile (218.2/km^{2}). There were 106 housing units at an average density of 277.3 per square mile (107.1/km^{2}). The racial makeup of the CDP was 91.67% White, 4.63% Black or African American, 3.24% Asian, and 0.46% from two or more races. Hispanic or Latino of any race were 6.02% of the population.

There were 94 households, out of which 28.7% had children under the age of 18 living with them, 43.6% were married couples living together, 17.0% had a female householder with no husband present, and 35.1% were non-families. 28.7% of all households were made up of individuals, and 12.8% had someone living alone who was 65 years of age or older. The average household size was 2.30 and the average family size was 2.79.

In the CDP, the population was spread out, with 23.6% under the age of 18, 5.6% from 18 to 24, 25.0% from 25 to 44, 29.2% from 45 to 64, and 16.7% who were 65 years of age or older. The median age was 41 years. For every 100 females, there were 98.2 males. For every 100 females age 18 and over, there were 94.1 males.

The median income for a household in the CDP was $33,162, and the median income for a family was $33,068. Males had a median income of $32,917 versus $19,375 for females. The per capita income for the CDP was $14,217. About 15.1% of families and 16.8% of the population were below the poverty line, including 25.8% of those under the age of eighteen and 16.7% of those 65 or over.

== Major highways ==
- New York State Route 17B (starts in Callicoon and ends in Monticello in the east)
- New York State Route 97 (runs from Hancock in the north to Port Jervis in the south, alongside the Delaware River)

== Attractions and events ==
- Callicoon Downtown Historic District
- U.S. National Register of Historic Places
- U.S. Historic district
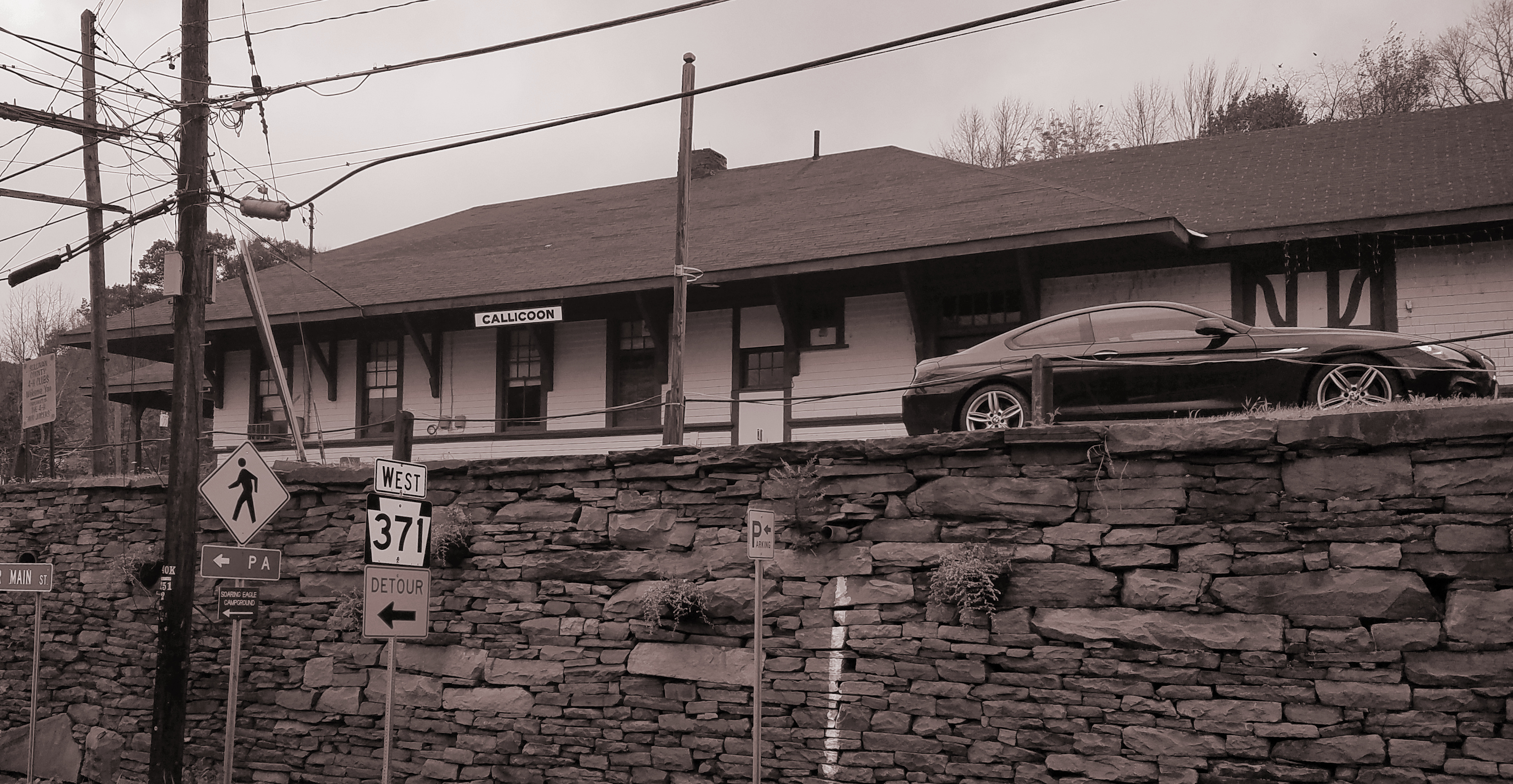
- Erie train station at Callicoon as seen from Lower Main St

- Location within New York
- Location: Main Sts, Highview & Mitchell Aves., River & Hospital Rds., Bridge St., and NY 9, Callicoon, New York
- Area: 26.5 acres (10.7 ha)
- NRHP reference No.: 16000390
- Added to NRHP: June 21, 2016

The Villa Roma Resort and Conference Center is a full resort hotel with tennis, cross-country skiing, lodging, and conference facilities. It is one of only a few resorts remaining in Sullivan County, a county once well known internationally for its massive resorts and entertainment venues.

Canoeing, rafting, camping, and hunting are major draws to the area. The Callicoon Canoe Regatta is held annually on a Sunday in early July. Dozens of competitors try their paddles on a journey navigating from the Callicoon Bridge to Skinner's Falls.

The Sullivan County Farmer's Market in Callicoon Creek Park on Sundays starting at 11:00 A.M. from Memorial day through November draws a big crowd as well. There is also a Holiday Market held in early December.

The Callicoon Business Association sponsors the Annual Tractor Parade, featuring more than 200 antique and modern tractors that travel down Main Street, in early June. The Callicoon Street Fair is held annually on the last Saturday of July, and once again, Main Street is closed down and turned over to a multitude of various vendors. The Street Fair features antiques, arts and crafts, homemade and hand-crafted items, food, and music.

Downtown Callicoon is part of the Callicoon Downtown Historic District, which was added to the National Register of Historic Places in 2016.

== Healthcare ==
Callicoon is home to the 25-bed Catskill Regional Medical Center, Grover M. Hermann Division, which serves the western portion of Sullivan County. A larger, more full-serviced hospital of the same name is located in Harris, between Monticello and Liberty.

== Media ==
Sullivan County Democrat is a newspaper published bi-weekly covering news and events throughout the county. Its head office is located on Main Street in Callicoon.

== Education ==
The Callicoon area was home to Delaware Valley Central School. It was consolidated with nearby area schools in Jeffersonville, New York and Narrowsburg, New York and then closed along with the Narrowsburg school. Jeffersonville's school has become the sole elementary school for the region. A new junior-high/senior-high school building was constructed in centrally located Lake Huntington, New York. The recently formed Sullivan West Central School District currently owns the school building in Callicoon, but remains unused.

Callicoon is the location of the Delaware Valley Job Corps Center, a job training facility located since 1979 in the former St. Joseph's Seraphic Seminary.

Delaware Free Library is a public library located on Main Street in the business district.

== Gallery ==
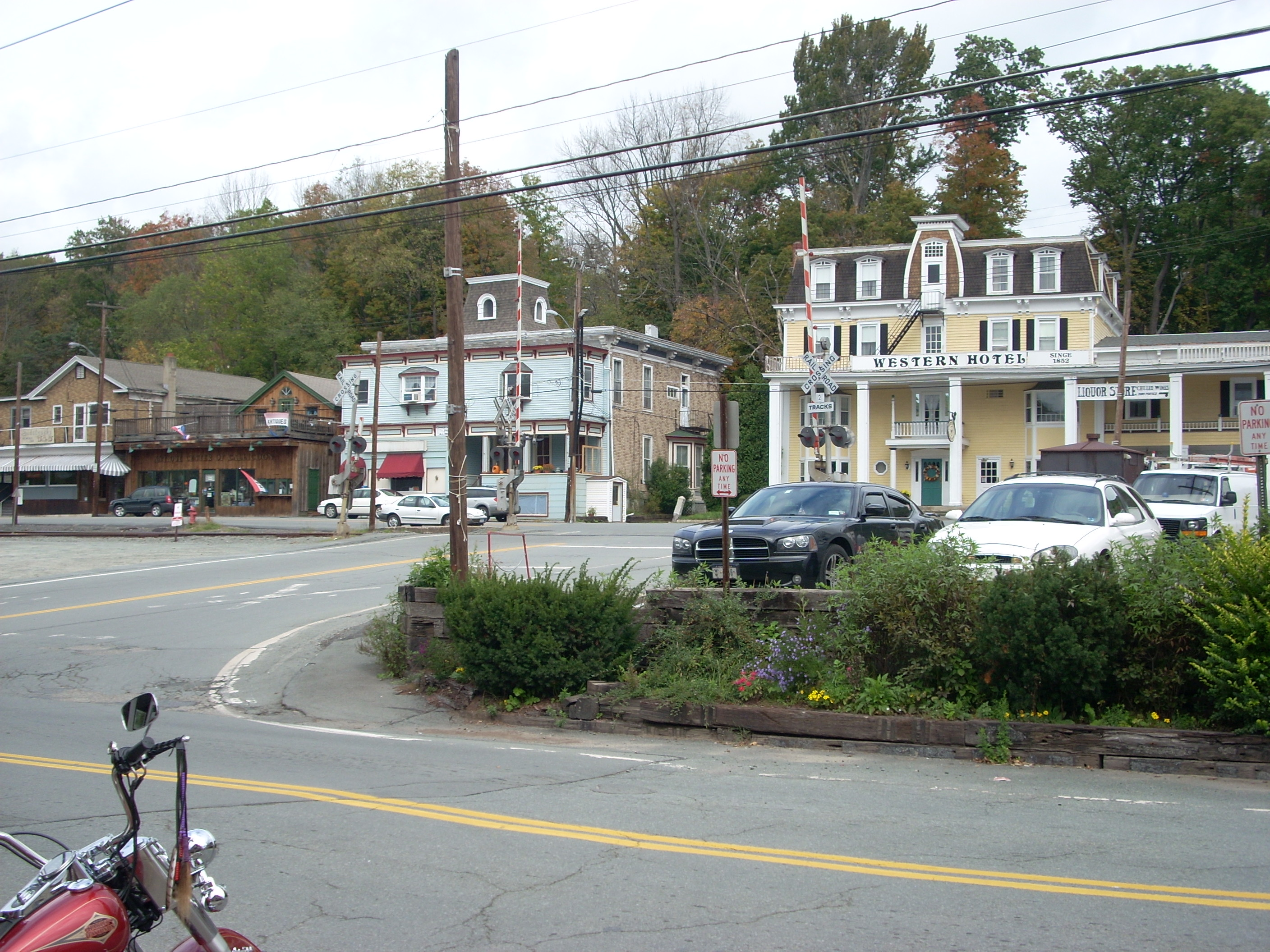
Central Callicoon

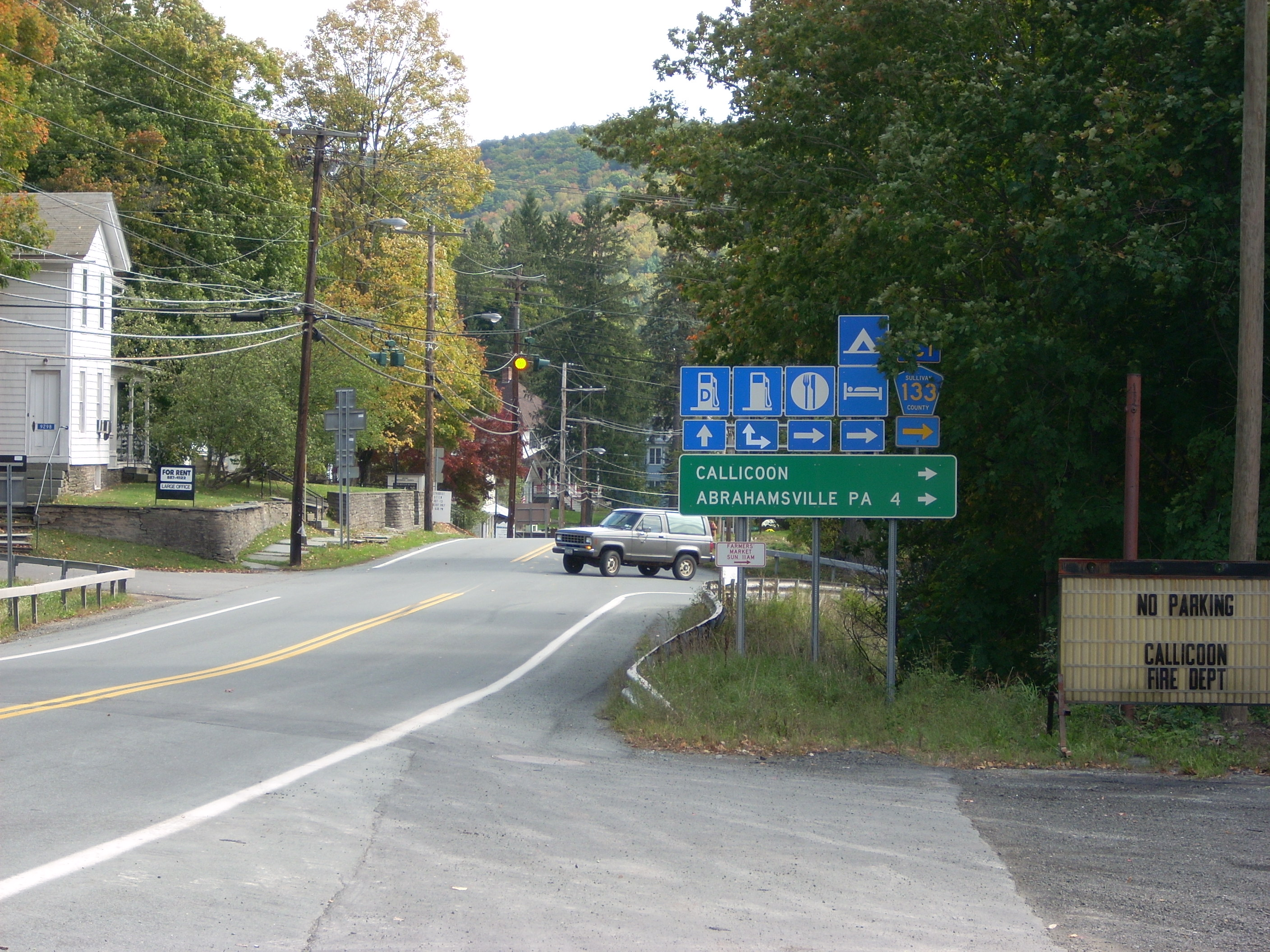
Route 97 in Callicoon

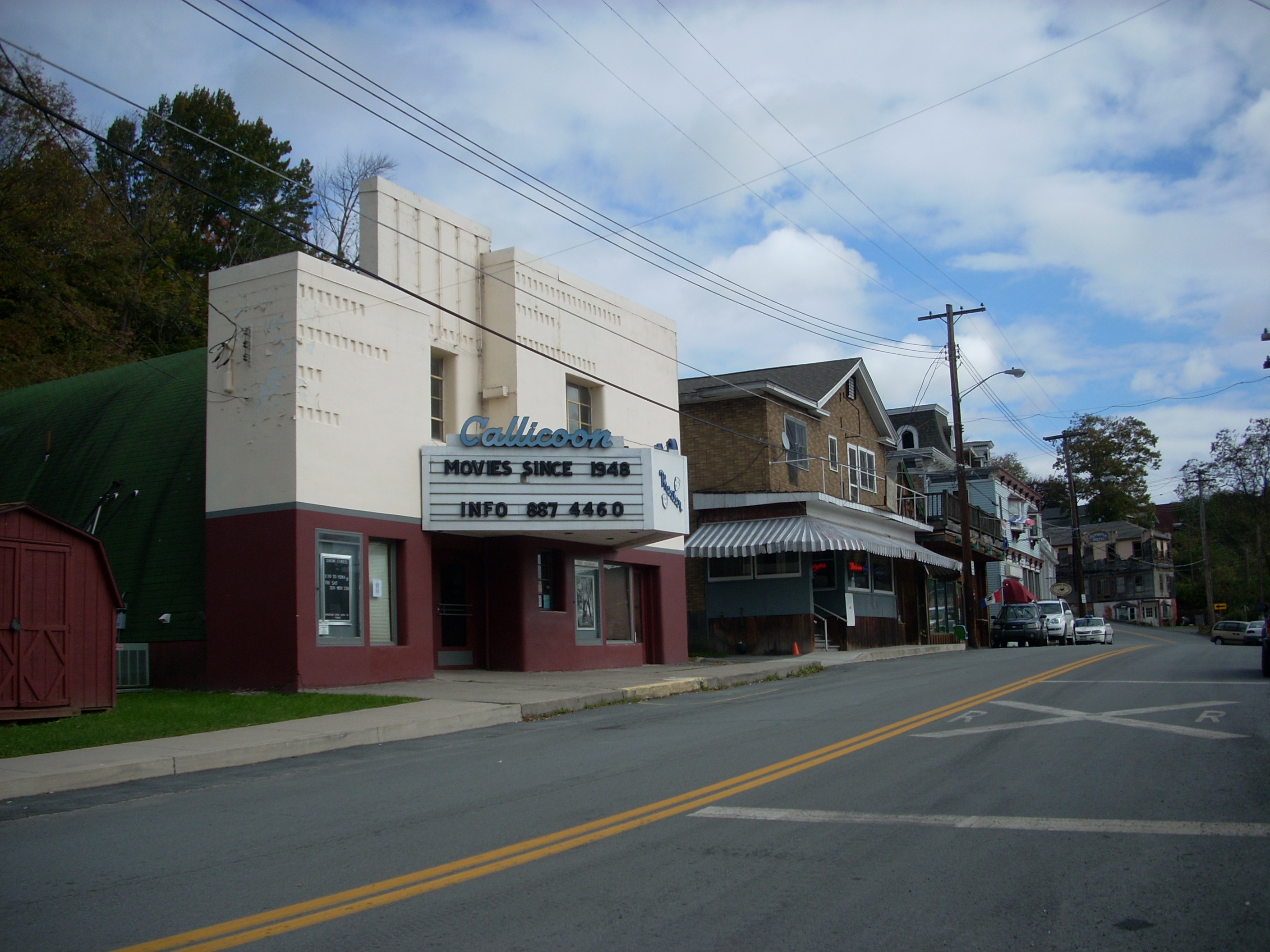
Callicoon Theater and other buildings in the business district

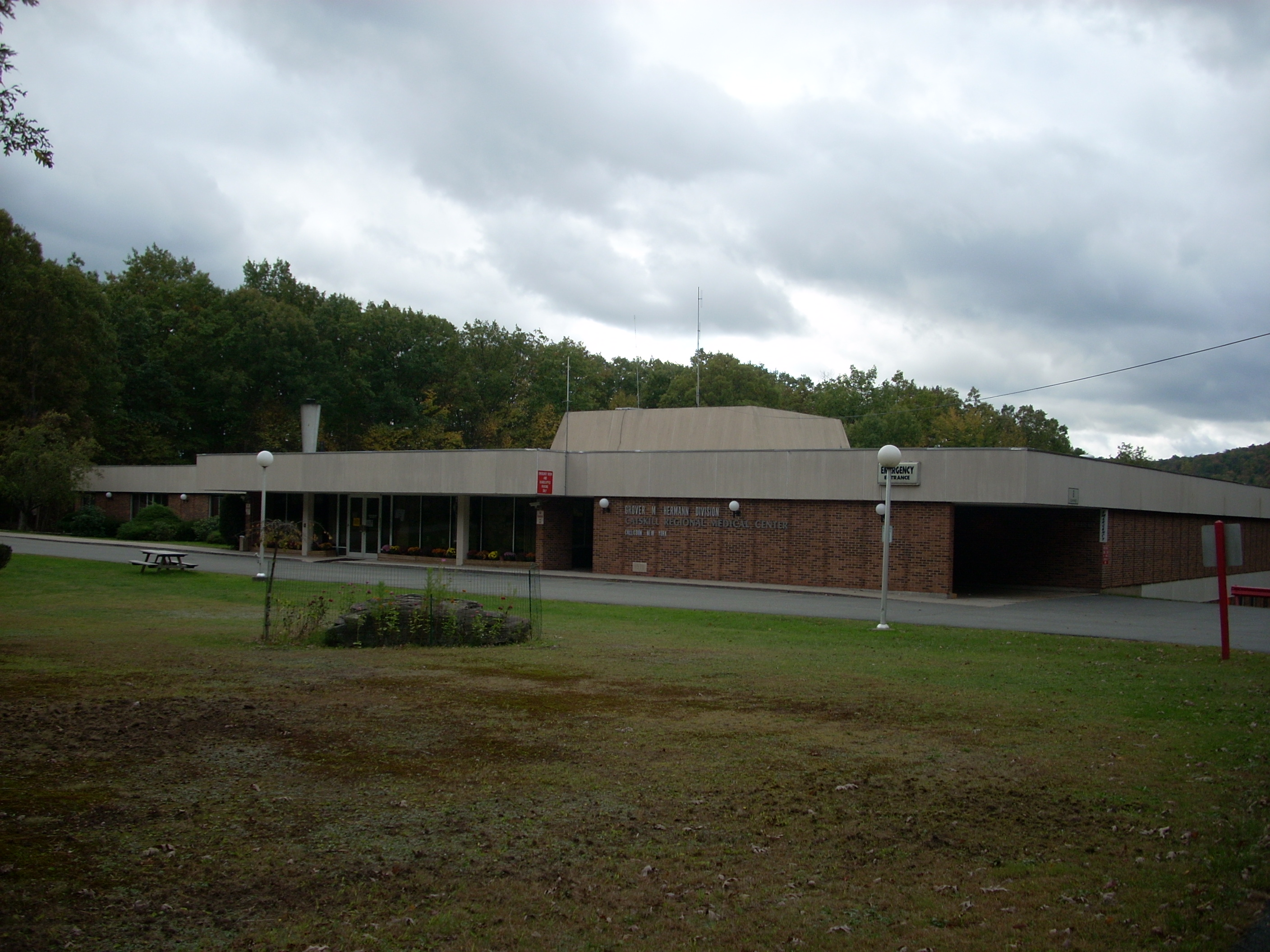
Grover M. Hermann Division of Catskill Regional Medical Center
