= Sullivan County Democrat =

Magazine

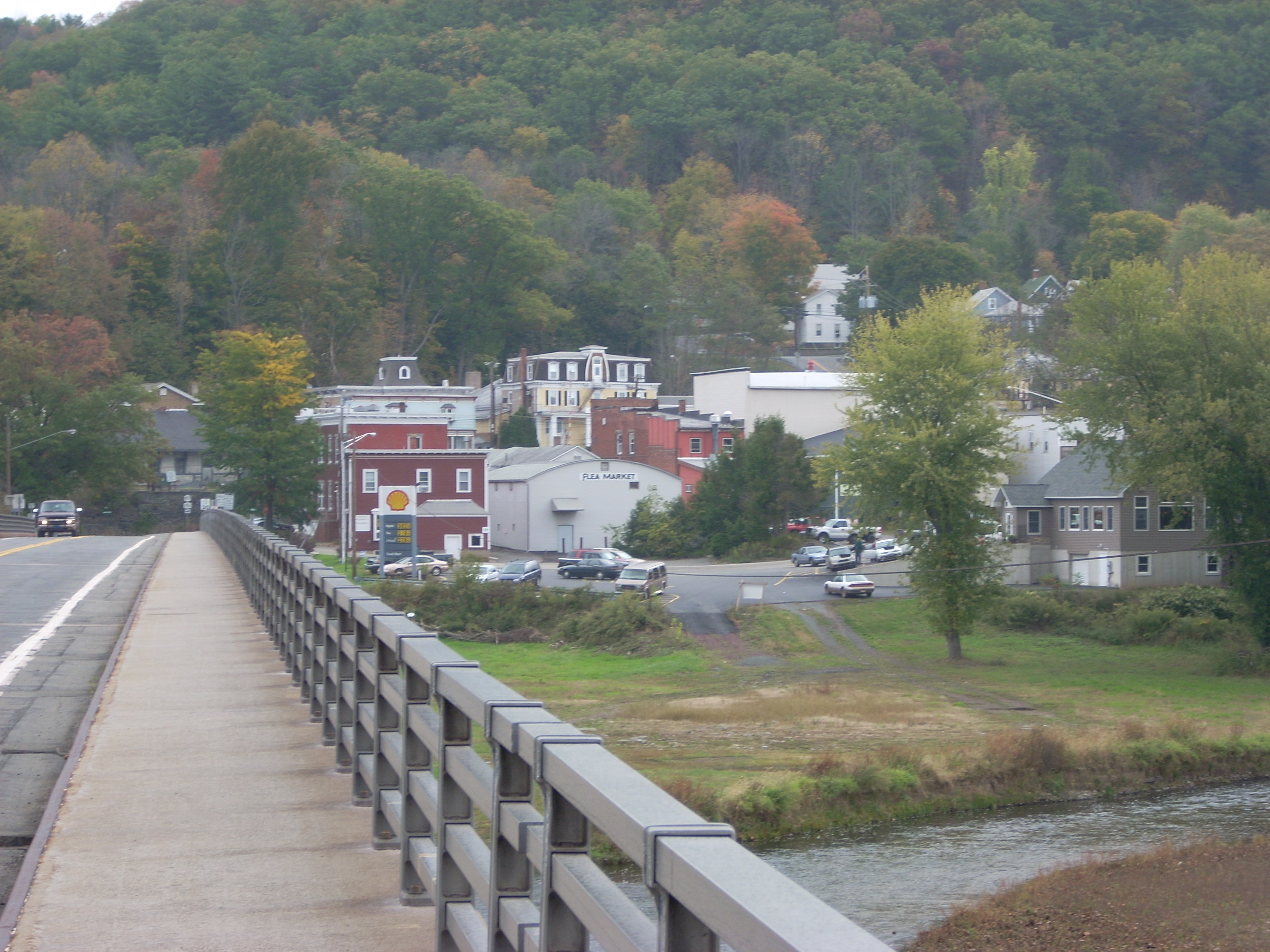
- Downtown Callicoon as seen from Pennsylvania across the Delaware River
- Type: Twice weekly newspaper
- Publisher: Fred Stabbert III
- Editor: Derek Kirk
- Staff writers: Nic Birgler, Alex Kielar
- Founded: 1891
- Headquarters: 5 Lower Main Street, Callicoon, NY 12723
- Website: https://www.scdemocratonline.com/

Sullivan County Democrat is "a semiweekly newspaper in Callicoon."

The "twice weekly newspaper" was established in 1891, and has been "independently owned and operated by the same family since 1927." Others, including The New York Times, cite their stories. In 2010, as her hometown newspaper, they biographied New York State Supreme Court Justice Judith Kaye. She had reached "mandatory retirement age," and they wrote: "Already the first woman on the high court, Kaye would become the first woman to hold its highest position – Chief Judge – when she was sworn in March 23, 1993." Kaye is an alumnus of a local school, Monticello High School (New York).
