= Delaware, New York =

Town in Sullivan County, New York, US

- Town
- Location of Delaware in Sullivan County, New York
- Coordinates: 41°45′40″N 75°0′8″W
- Country: United States
- State: New York
- County: Sullivan

Area
  - Total: 35.59 sq mi (92.17 km^{2})
  - Land: 34.89 sq mi (90.36 km^{2})
  - Water: 0.70 sq mi (1.81 km^{2})
- Elevation: 1,300 ft (400 m)

Population (2020)
  - Total: 2,203
  - Density: 63.1/sq mi (24.38/km^{2})
- Time zone: UTC-5 (Eastern (EST))
  - Summer (DST): UTC-4 (EDT)
- FIPS code: 36-20104
- GNIS feature ID: 0978894

Delaware is a town in Sullivan County, New York, United States. The population was 2,203 at the 2020 census.

The Town of Delaware is in the western part of the county.

== History ==
The town was formed in 1869 from the Town of Cochecton.

== Geography ==
The western town line, delineated by the Delaware River, is the border of Wayne County, Pennsylvania.

According to the United States Census Bureau, the town has a total area of 35.3 square miles (91 km^{2}), of which 34.7 square miles (90 km^{2}) is land and 0.6 square miles (1.6 km^{2}) (1.67%) is water.

== Demographics ==
Historical population
| Census | Pop. | Note | %± |
|---|---|---|---|
| 1870 | 1,998 | | — |
| 1880 | 1,830 | | −8.4% |
| 1890 | 1,734 | | −5.2% |
| 1900 | 1,541 | | −11.1% |
| 1910 | 1,842 | | 19.5% |
| 1920 | 1,740 | | −5.5% |
| 1930 | 1,777 | | 2.1% |
| 1940 | 1,934 | | 8.8% |
| 1950 | 2,089 | | 8.0% |
| 1960 | 2,141 | | 2.5% |
| 1970 | 2,260 | | 5.6% |
| 1980 | 2,783 | | 23.1% |
| 1990 | 2,633 | | −5.4% |
| 2000 | 2,720 | | 3.3% |
| 2010 | 2,670 | | −1.8% |
| 2020 | 2,203 | | −17.5% |

As of the census of 2000, there were 2,719 people, 956 households, and 657 families residing in the town. The population density was 78.3 inhabitants per square mile (30.2/km^{2}). There were 1,337 housing units at an average density of 38.5 per square mile (14.9/km^{2}). The racial makeup of the town was 87.31% White, 9.71% African American, 0.22% Native American, 0.81% Asian, 0.04% Pacific Islander, 0.99% from other races, and 0.92% from two or more races. Hispanic or Latino of any race were 6.33% of the population.

There were 956 households, out of which 28.3% had children under the age of 18 living with them, 55.6% were married couples living together, 10.0% had a female householder with no husband present, and 31.2% were non-families. 26.3% of all households were made up of individuals, and 10.6% had someone living alone who was 65 years of age or older. The average household size was 2.44 and the average family size was 2.93.

In the town, the population was spread out, with 26.8% under the age of 18, 12.7% from 18 to 24, 23.1% from 25 to 44, 23.2% from 45 to 64, and 14.3% who were 65 years of age or older. The median age was 36 years. For every 100 females, there were 101.6 males. For every 100 females age 18 and over, there were 100.6 males.

The median income for a household in the town was $40,145, and the median income for a family was $45,875. Males had a median income of $37,700 versus $22,885 for females. The per capita income for the town was $17,884. About 6.2% of families and 20.0% of the population were below the poverty line, including 15.2% of those under age 18 and 6.1% of those age 65 or over.

== Communities and locations in Delaware ==
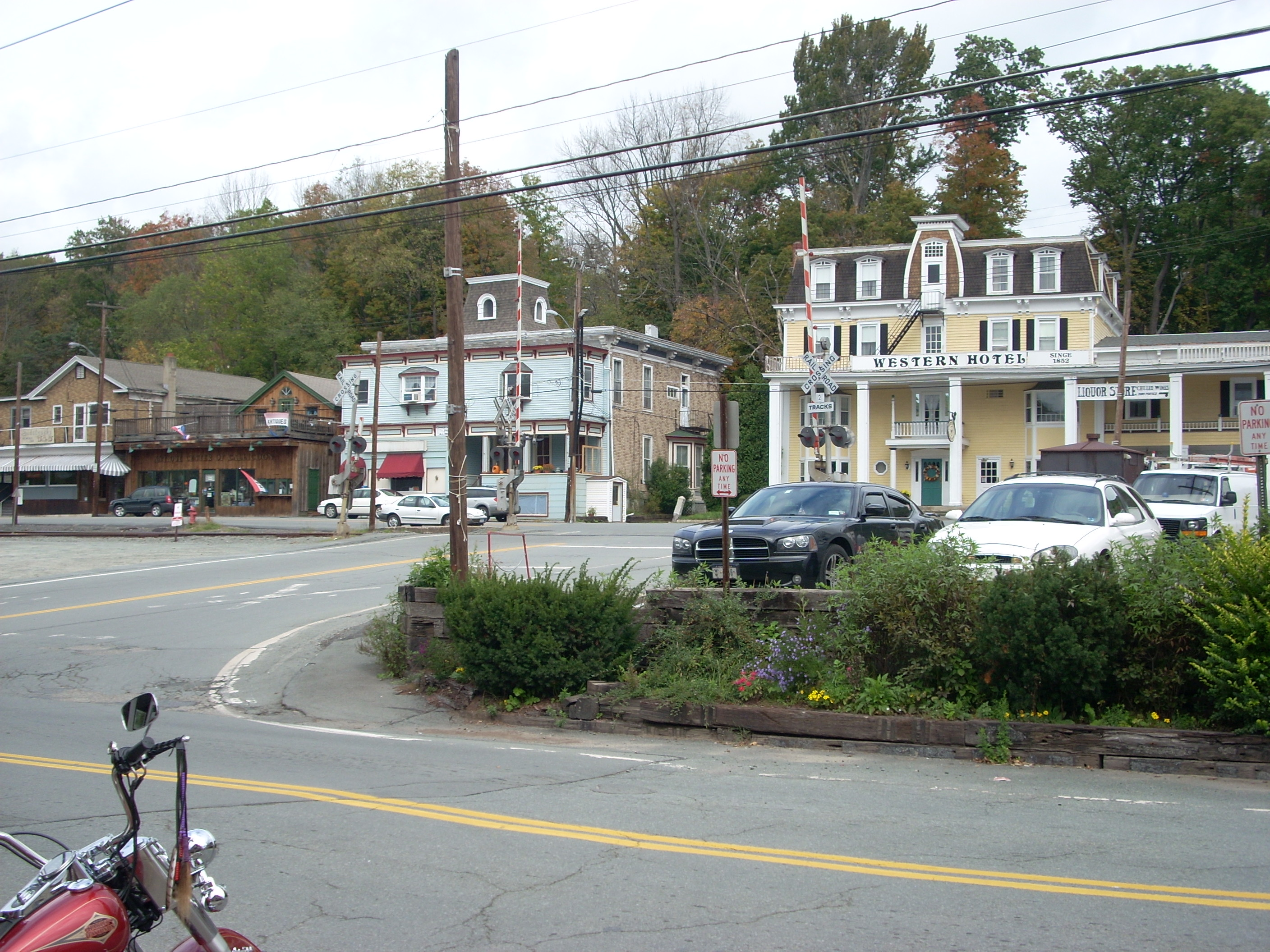
Callicoon

- Callicoon (formerly Callicoon Depot) – A hamlet by the western town line. The community has the same name as the Town of Callicoon in the county.
- Falls Mills – A hamlet in the southeastern part of the town.
- Hortonville – A hamlet east of Callicoon. The German Presbyterian Church and Hortonville Cemetery was listed on the National Register of Historic Places in 2002.
- Kenoza Lake – A hamlet, formerly called Pike Pond, in the southeastern part of the town. The Stone Arch Bridge was listed on the National Register of Historic Places in 1976.
- Kohlertown – A hamlet in the northeastern part of the town.
- Swiss Hill – A hamlet in the northeastern part of the town.
- Lower Beechwood – A hamlet south of Upper Beechwood in the southeastern part of the town.
- Upper Beechwood – A hamlet in the north central part of the town.
