= Stone Arch Bridge (Kenoza Lake, New York) =

- U.S. National Register of Historic Places
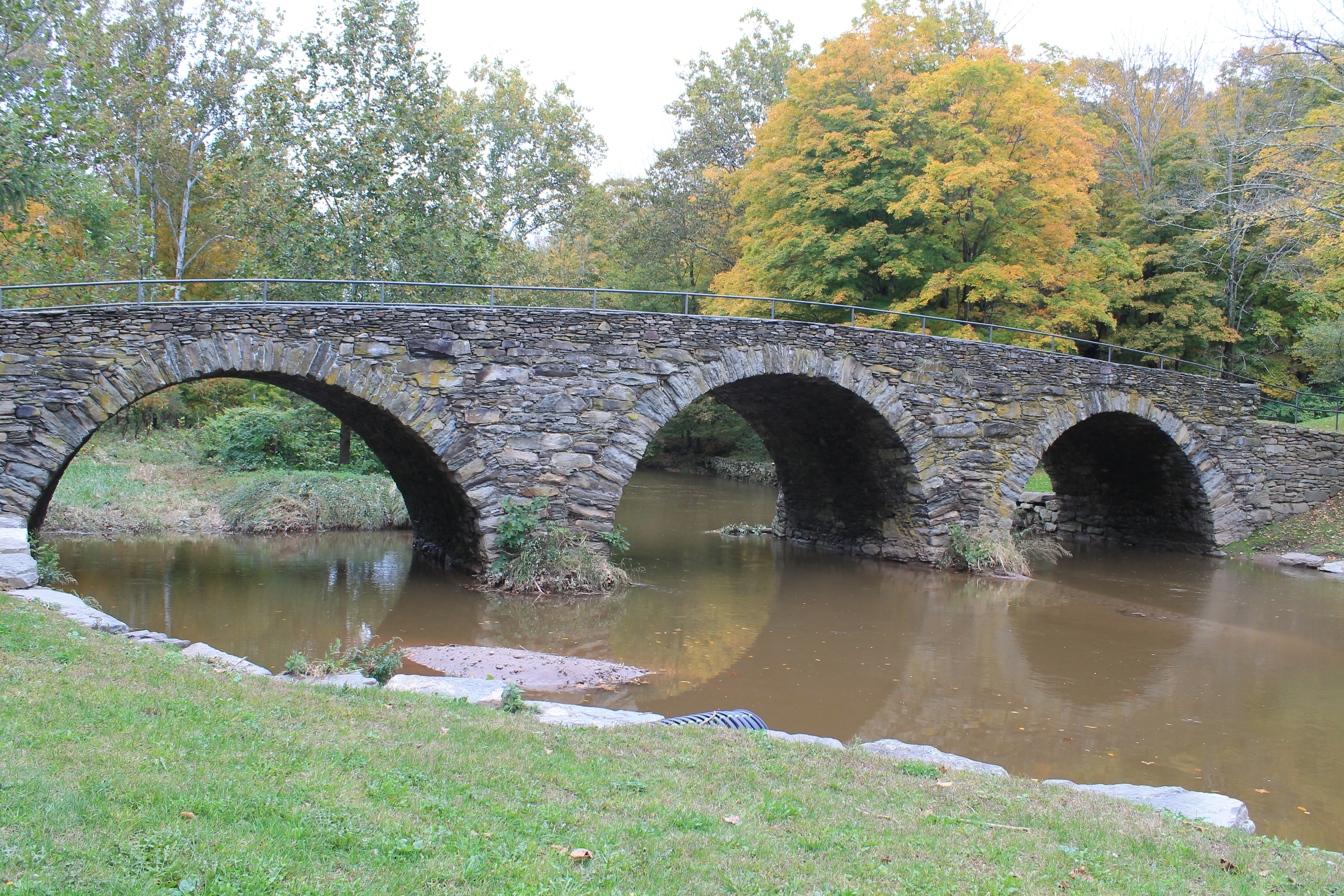

- Location within New York Location within the United States
- Nearest city: Kenoza Lake, New York
- Coordinates: 41°44′53″N 74°57′15″W
- Area: 4.4 acres (1.8 ha)
- Built: 1873
- Architect: Hembt, Henry
- NRHP reference No.: 76001285
- Added to NRHP: December 12, 1976

Stone Arch Bridge is a historic stone arch bridge located at Kenoza Lake, near Jeffersonville, in Sullivan County, New York. It was built in 1873 and is a solid masonry structure with an arched roadway supported by three arches made of hand cut stone. It spans the East Branch Callicoon Creek.

It was added to the National Register of Historic Places in 1976.

== See also ==
- List of bridges and tunnels on the National Register of Historic Places in New York
- National Register of Historic Places listings in Sullivan County, New York
