= German Presbyterian Church and Hortonville Cemetery =

Historic church in Sullivan County, New York, US

- U.S. National Register of Historic Places
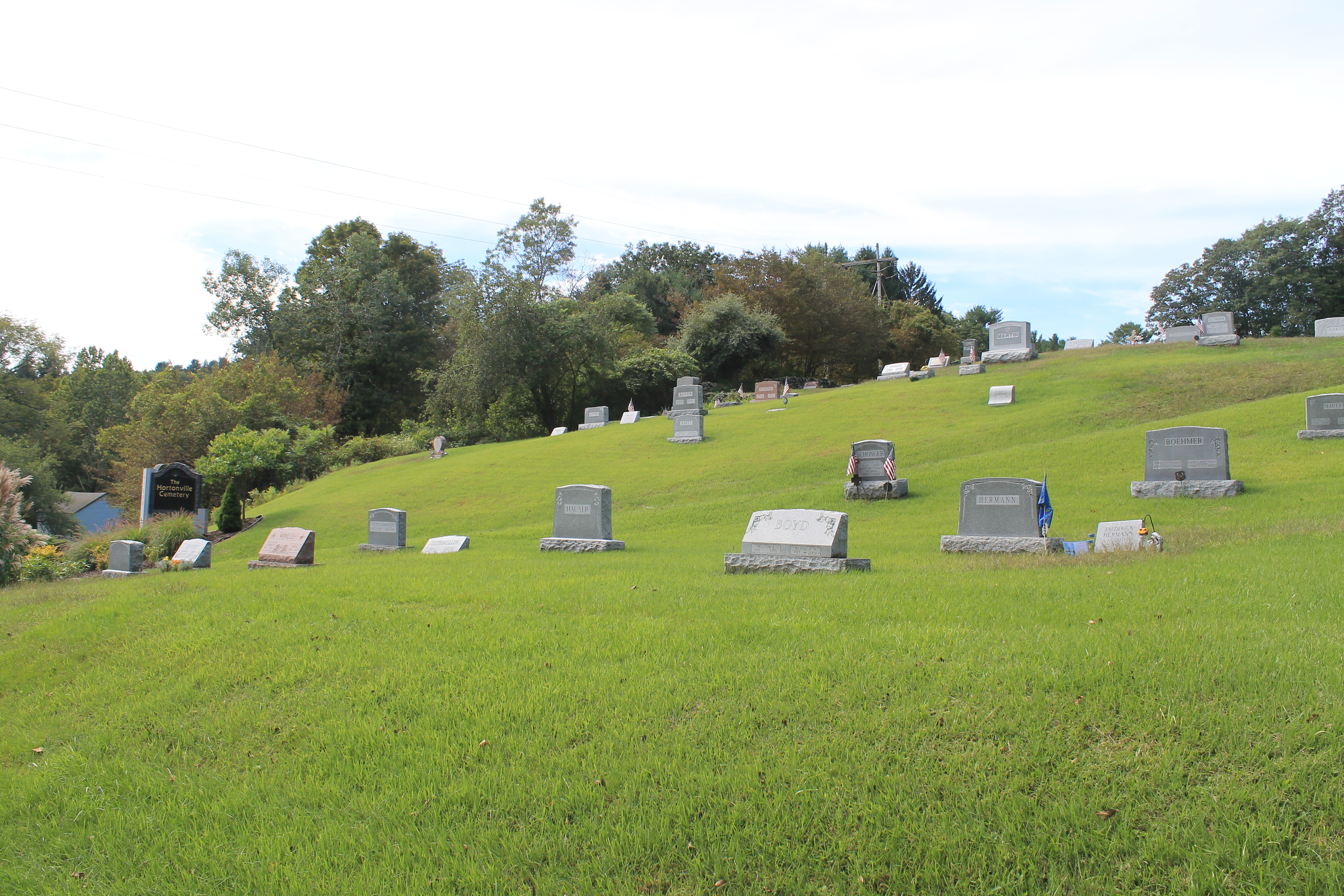
- Hortonville Cemetery

- Location within New York Location within the United States Location within the United States
- Location: CR 121 and CR 131, Hortonville, New York
- Coordinates: 41°46′21″N 75°1′42″W
- Area: 4 acres (1.6 ha)
- Built: 1860
- Architect: Robisch, John
- Architectural style: Mid 19th Century Revival, Late 19th And 20th Century Revivals
- NRHP reference No.: 02001712
- Added to NRHP: January 15, 2003

German Presbyterian Church and Hortonville Cemetery, also known as Hortonville Presbyterian Church, is a historic Presbyterian church and cemetery located at CR 121 and CR 131 in Hortonville, Sullivan County, New York. The church was built about 1860 and is a one-story, rectangular wood-frame building, 27 feet long and 41 feet wide. It features a steep gable roof with two stage tower and small spire. The cemetery is located about a quarter mile from the church and contains approximately 100 stones. The cemetery contains the stone foundation of the original meeting house.

It has been listed on the National Register of Historic Places since 2002.
