= Liberty Downtown Historic District (Liberty, New York) =

Historic district in New York, United States

- U.S. National Register of Historic Places
- U.S. Historic district
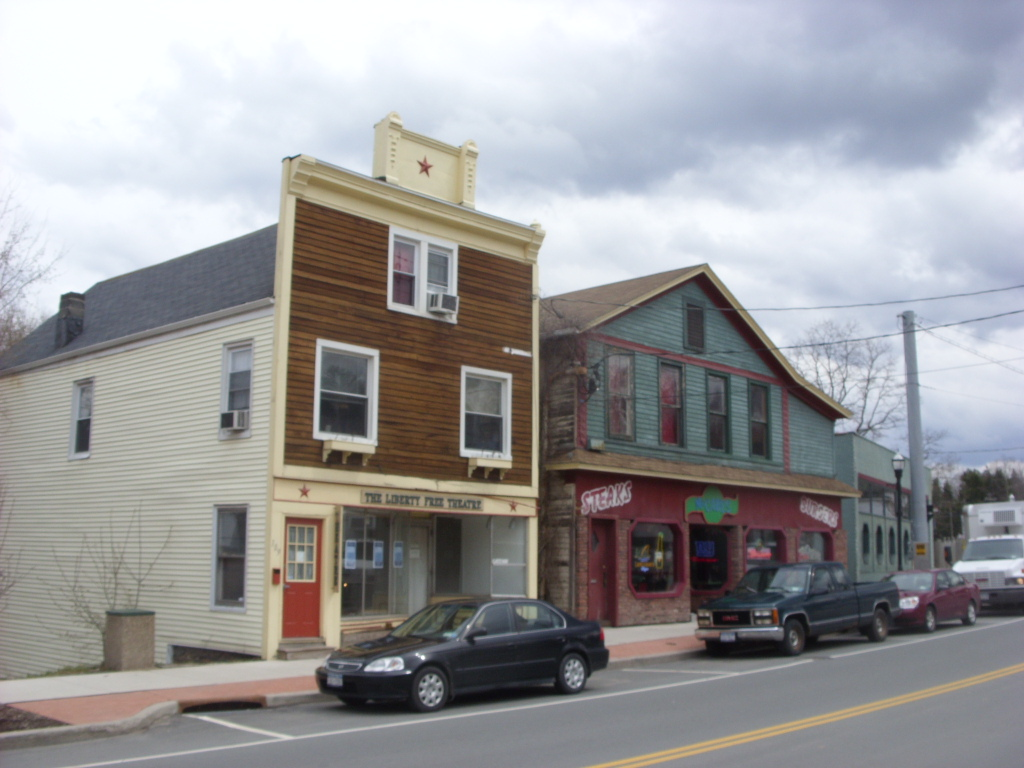
- Liberty Downtown Historic District, April 2009

- Location within New York Location within the United States
- Location: Main, Chestnut, Academy, School, Church, Maple, John, Edgar Sts., and Darbee Ln., Liberty, New York
- Coordinates: 41°48′3″N 74°44′48″W
- Architect: Pember, W.P.; Wentworth, Wesley, et al.
- Architectural style: Mid 19th Century Revival, Late 19th And 20th Century Revivals, et al.
- NRHP reference No.: 06000266
- Liberty Village Historic District
- U.S. National Register of Historic Places
- U.S. Historic district
- Location within New York Location within the United States
- Location: N. Main, Academy, and Law Sts., Liberty, New York
- Area: 3 acres (1 ha)
- Built: 1870
- Architectural style: Greek Revival, Romanesque, Gothic Revival
- NRHP reference No.: 78001921
- Added to NRHP: April 11, 1978
- Added to NRHP: May 26, 2006

Liberty Downtown Historic District is a historic district located at Liberty in Sullivan County, New York. The district includes 112 contributing buildings and comprises the village's commercial core. It subsumes the Liberty Village Historic District listed in 1978, which had 12 contributing buildings.

It was listed on the National Register of Historic Places in 1978 and 2006. Allan Bérubé (1946–2007) helped to establish the enlarged historic district.

== Gallery ==
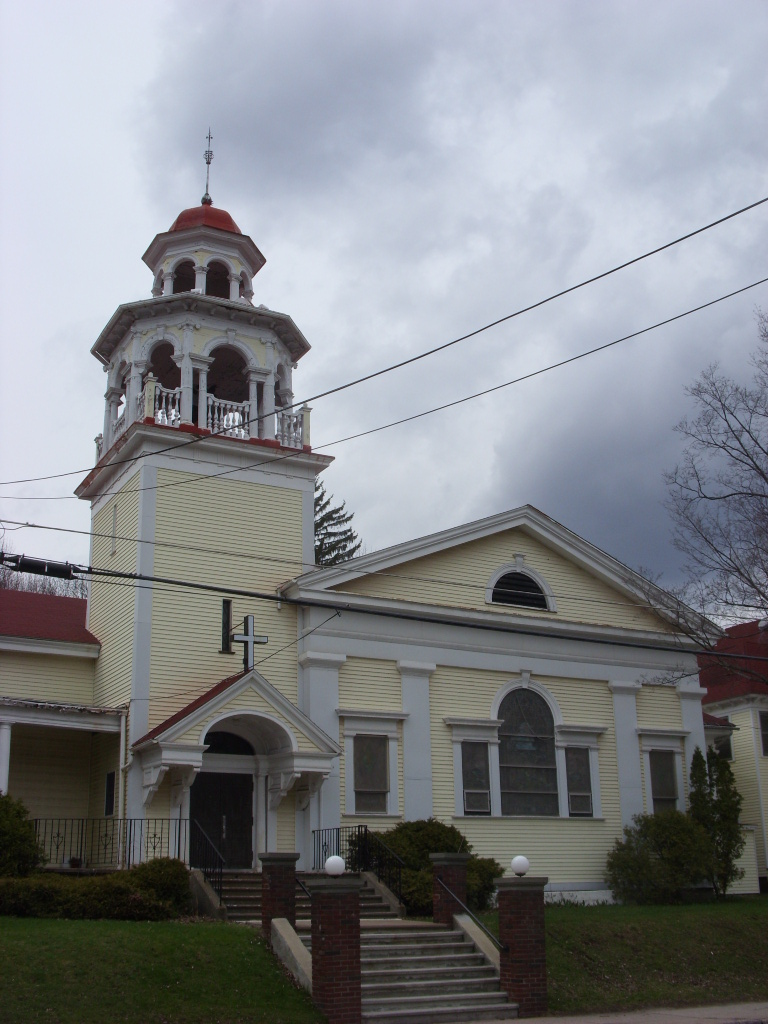
