= Old Cochecton Cemetery =

Historic cemetery in New York, United States

- U.S. National Register of Historic Places
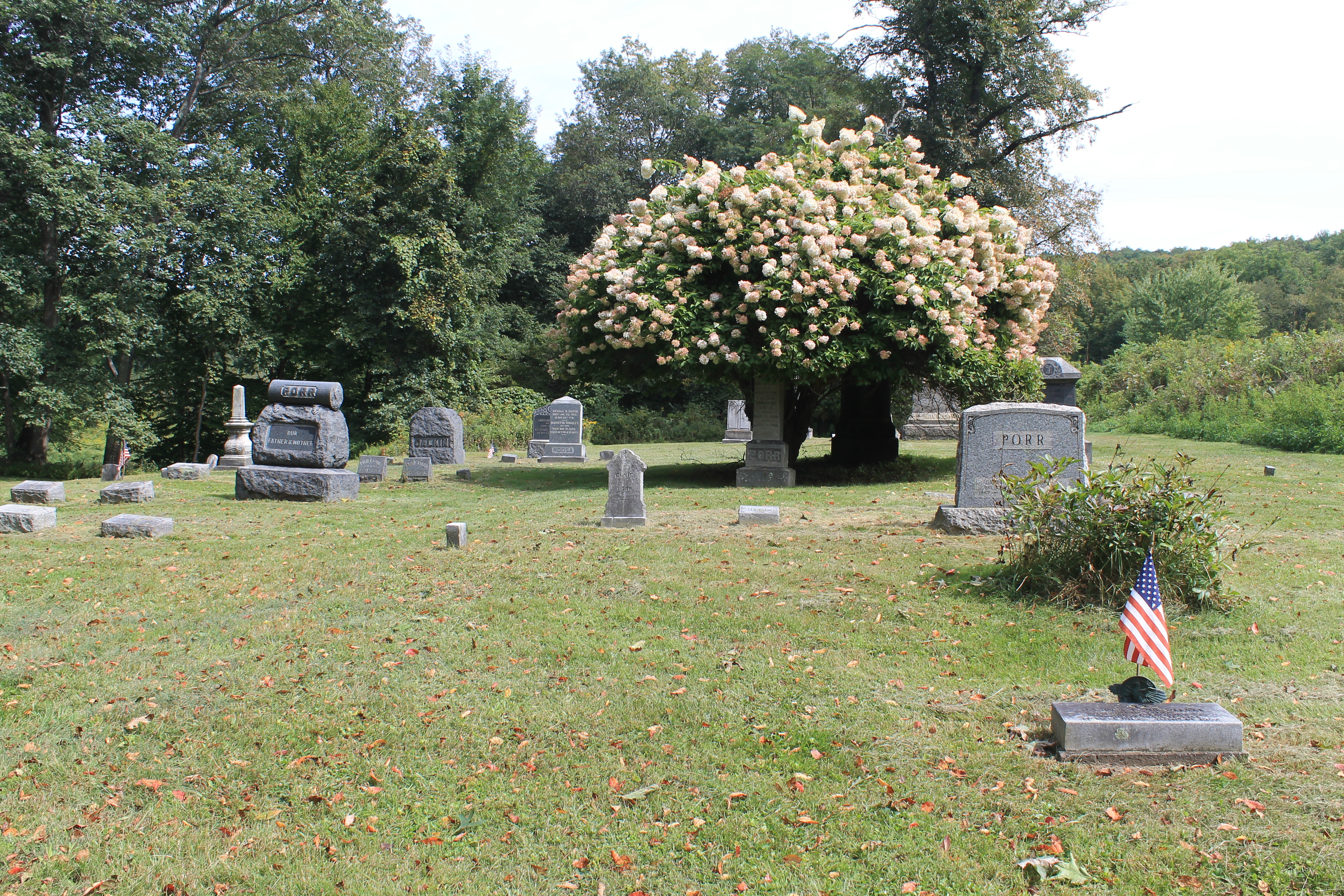

- Location within New York Location within the United States
- Location: W of NY 97, N of jct. with Co. Rd. 114, Cochecton, New York
- Coordinates: 41°42′40″N 75°2′58″W
- Area: 1 acre (0.40 ha)
- MPS: Upper Delaware Valley, New York and Pennsylvania MPS
- NRHP reference No.: 92001593
- Added to NRHP: November 27, 1992

Old Cochecton Cemetery is a historic cemetery located at Cochecton in Sullivan County, New York, United States. It was established about 1774 and believed to contain about 150 burials. The earliest extant markers date to 1798 and 1809.

It was added to the National Register of Historic Places in 1992.
