= Cochecton station =

Cochecton
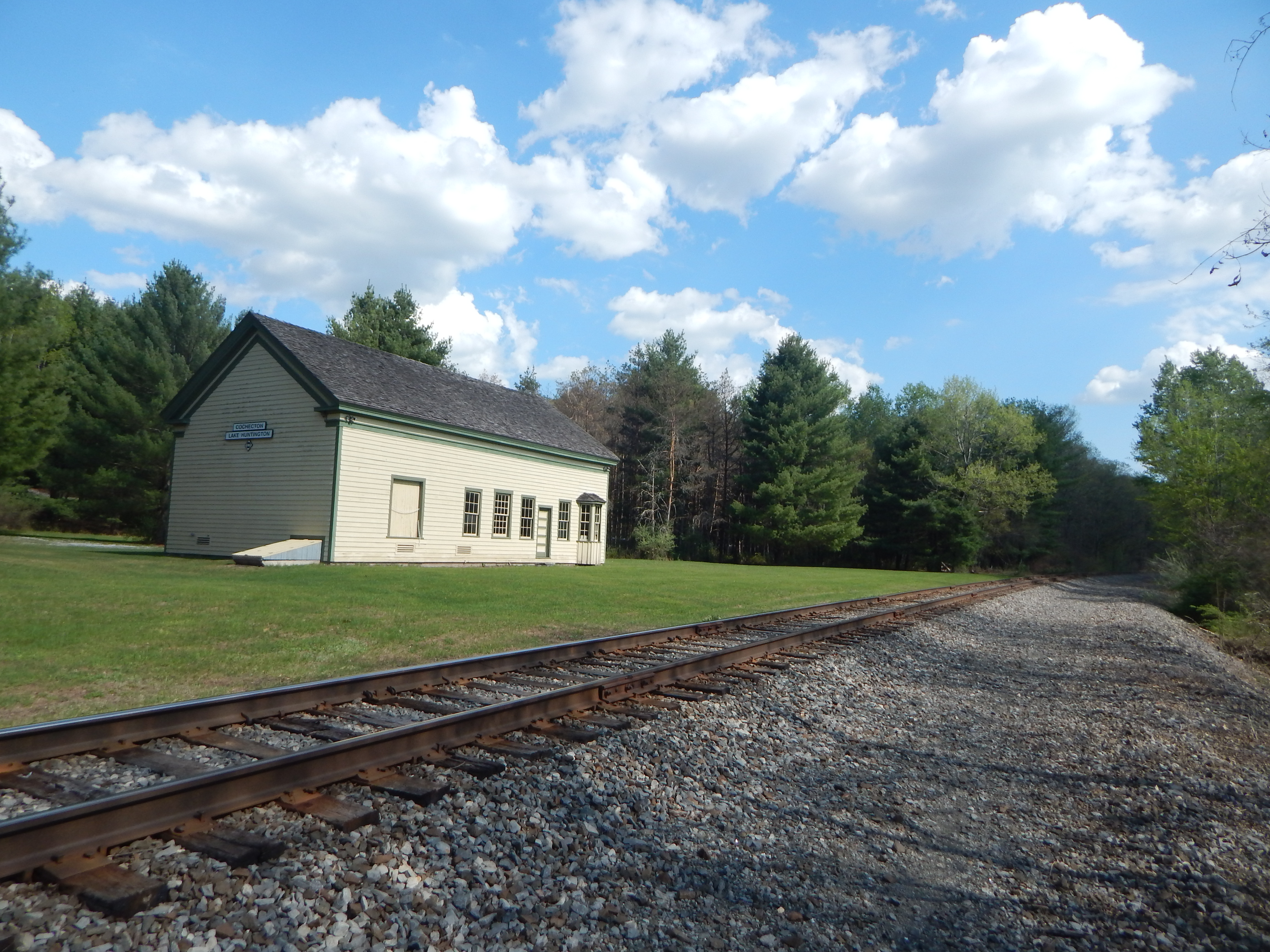
- The Cochecton station in May 2015.

General information
- Location: Depot Road, Cochecton, New York 12726 (former location); 8561 Route 97, Cochecton, New York 12726 (current location)
- Line: Main Line (Delaware Division)
- Platforms: 1 side platform
- Tracks: 2

Construction
- Platform levels: 1

Other information
- Station code: 3057

History
- Opened: 1850; 176 years ago
- Closed: November 1966; 59 years ago

Former services
Preceding station	Erie Railroad	Following station
Callicoon toward Chicago	Main Line	Skinners toward Jersey City
- Cochecton Railroad Station
- U.S. National Register of Historic Places
- Location within New York Location within the United States
- Nearest city: Cochecton, New York
- Coordinates: 41°43′4″N 75°2′46″W
- Area: 5 acres (2.0 ha)
- Built: 1850
- Architectural style: Greek Revival
- MPS: Upper Delaware Valley, New York and Pennsylvania MPS
- NRHP reference No.: 05000172
- Added to NRHP: March 16, 2005
Location

Cochecton Railroad Station is a historic train station located at Cochecton in Sullivan County, New York. It was built about 1850 by the Erie Railroad as a freight house. It is a large, 1-story frame building with Greek Revival style details. The 1 1/2-story, rectangular building measures 30 feet wide and 50 feet deep and is topped by a gable roof. The last passenger trains at Cocheton were unnamed trains from Hoboken, New Jersey to Binghamton timed to meet up with the Phoebe Snow.

It is the oldest surviving station in New York state. It was moved from its original site in the early 1990s to be saved from demolition.

It was added to the National Register of Historic Places in 2005.
