= Rialto Theater (Monticello, New York) =

- Rialto Theatre
- U.S. National Register of Historic Places
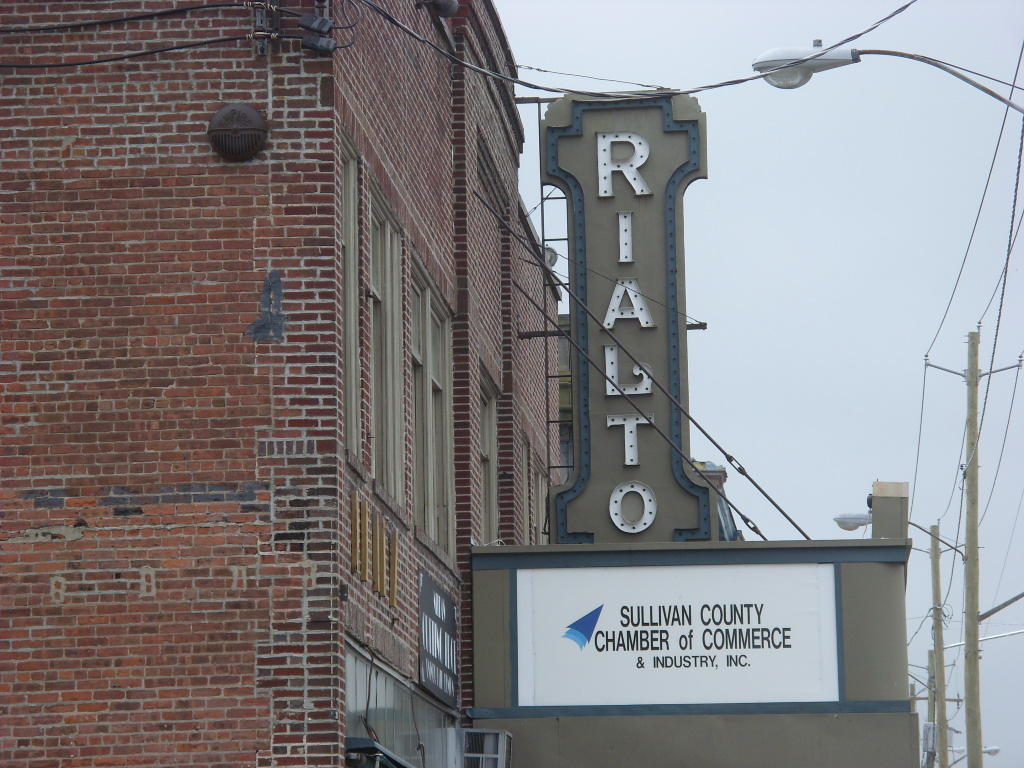
- Rialto Theater, May 2009

- Location within New York Location within the United States
- Location: Broadway, Monticello, New York
- Coordinates: 41°39′20″N 74°41′17″W
- Area: less than one acre
- Built: 1921
- Architect: Motel, Emil
- Architectural style: Late 19th And 20th Century Revivals
- NRHP reference No.: 01000043
- Added to NRHP: February 2, 2001

Rialto Theatre, also known as the Miller and Washington Block, is a historic commercial block and theatre located at Monticello in Sullivan County, New York. It was built in 1921 and the theatre was developed as part of a commercial block which incorporated three storefronts and a restaurant occupying the entire second floor. The block is two stories tall and a broad six bays wide, constructed of brick. The theatre auditorium extended 136 feet to the rear and constructed of parged concrete. The former lobby is occupied by a storefront. The auditorium was demolished in 2003. The theater's marquee was removed during renovations in 2012, supposedly because it was deteriorated, when "workers pulled it apart in pieces and junked it," according to a published account.

It was added to the National Register of Historic Places in 2001.
