= Cochecton Center Methodist Episcopal Church =

Historic church in New York, United States

- U.S. National Register of Historic Places
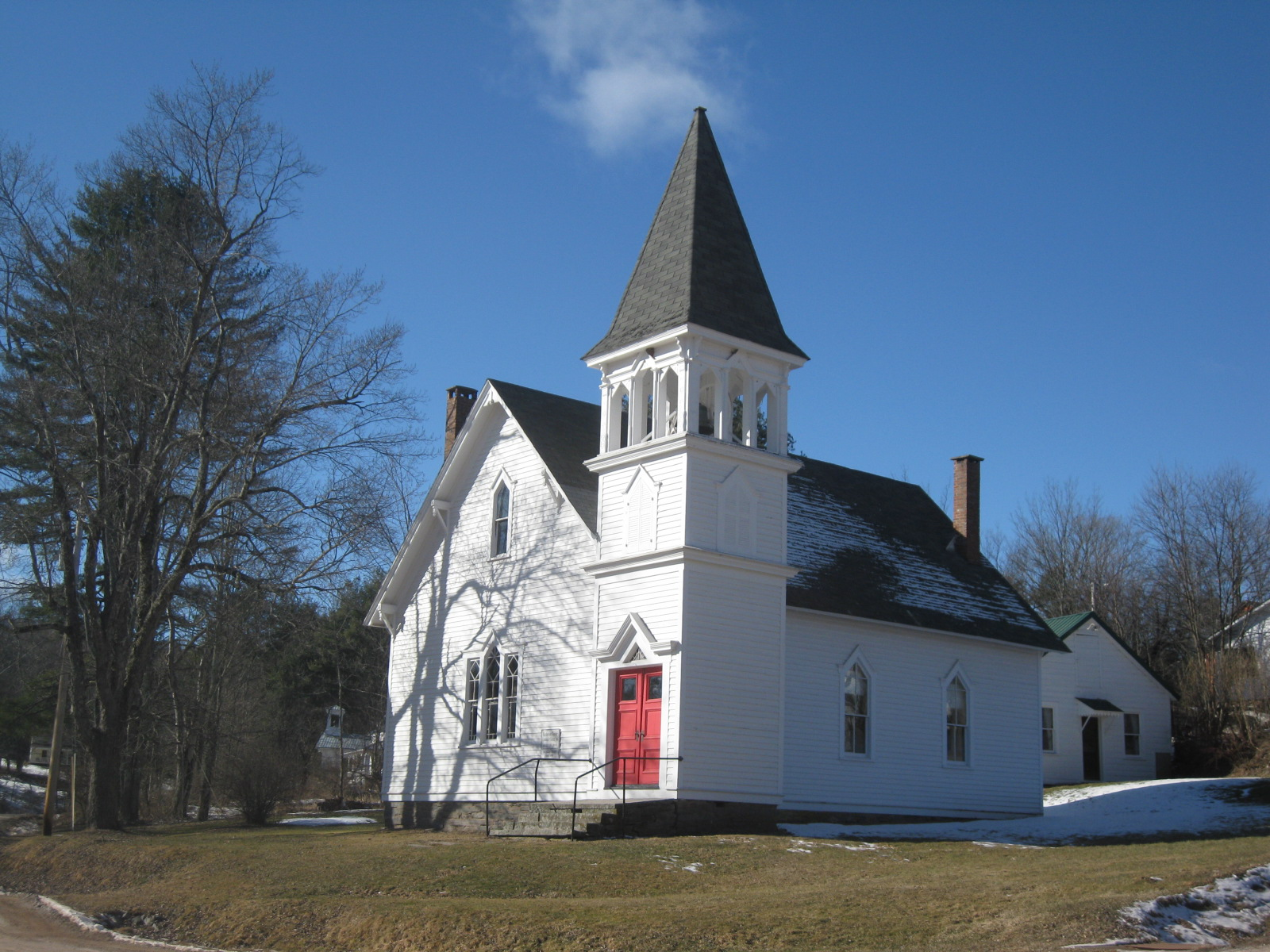
- Cochecton Center Methodist Episcopal Church, February 2010

- Location within New York Location within the United States
- Location: Skipperine Rd., Cochecton Center, New York
- Coordinates: 41°39′21″N 74°59′5″W
- Area: less than one acre
- Built: 1892
- NRHP reference No.: 00000343
- Added to NRHP: April 21, 2000

Cochecton Center Methodist Episcopal Church, also known as Cochecton Center Community Center, is a historic Methodist Episcopal church on Skipperene Road in Cochecton Center, Sullivan County, New York. It was built in 1892 and is a small, rectangular, wood-frame building with clapboard siding on an ashlar foundation and a steep gable roof. It features a three-stage, corner entrance tower surmounted by a tall spire. Also on the property is a former stable, dated to 1912, that was converted for use as a church hall in 1925.

It was added to the National Register of Historic Places in 2000.
