= Valleau Tavern =

Historic commercial building in New York, United States

- U.S. National Register of Historic Places
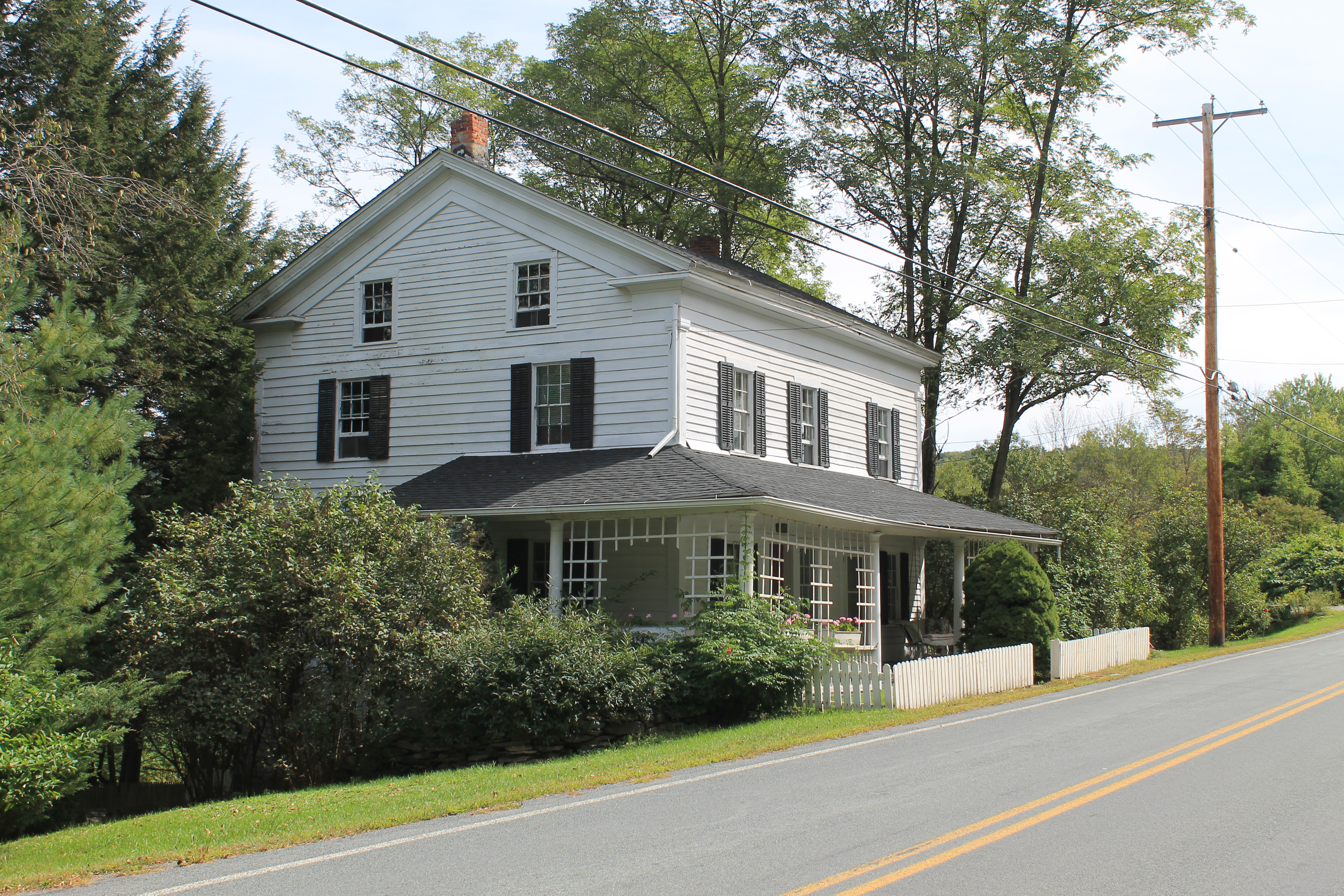

- Location within New York Location within the United States
- Location: Jct. of Co. Rd. 114 and NY 97, Cochecton, New York
- Coordinates: 41°42′37″N 75°3′16″W
- Area: less than one acre
- Built: 1829
- Architectural style: Federal
- MPS: Upper Delaware Valley, New York and Pennsylvania MPS
- NRHP reference No.: 92001599
- Added to NRHP: November 27, 1992

Valleau Tavern is a historic tavern located at Cochecton in Sullivan County, New York. It was built in 1829 and is a three-story vernacular building of the Federal period with a gable roof. It is clapboard sided of post and beam construction and features a one-story porch with a hipped roof.

It was added to the National Register of Historic Places in 1992.
