= Callicoon National Bank =

Historic commercial building in New York, United States

- U.S. National Register of Historic Places
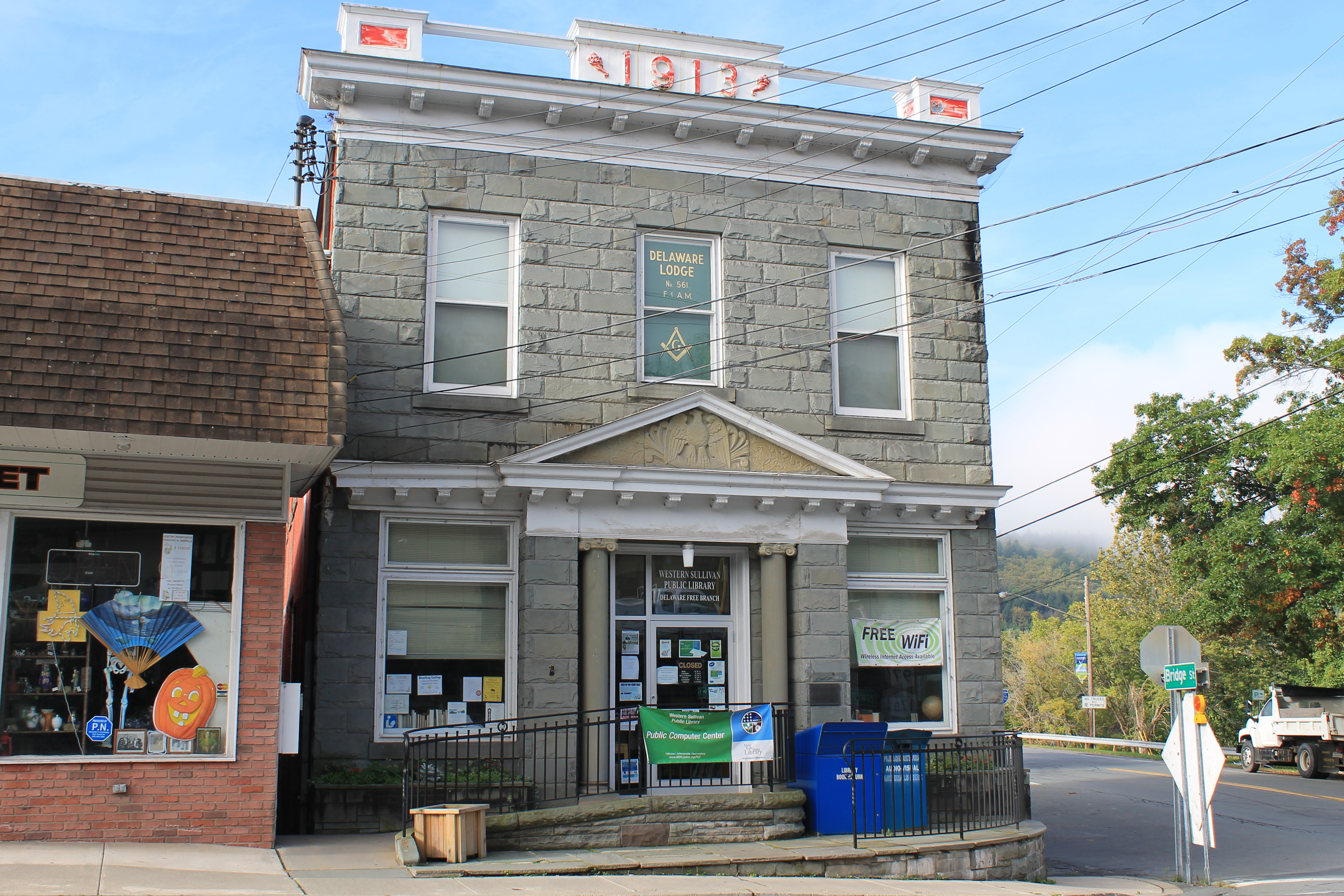

- Location within New York Location within the United States
- Location: 133 Main St., Callicoon, New York
- Coordinates: 41°45′58″N 75°3′32″W
- Area: less than one acre
- Built: 1913
- Architect: Kohler, William; Jones, Beers & Co.
- Architectural style: Classical Revival
- MPS: Upper Delaware Valley, New York and Pennsylvania MPS
- NRHP reference No.: 94000048
- Added to NRHP: February 18, 1994

Callicoon National Bank, also known as Delaware Free Library, is a historic bank building located at Callicoon in Sullivan County, New York. It was built in 1913 and is a two-story masonry building, rectangular in plan with a flat roof. The symmetrical bluestone facade features a pedimented entrance with Ionic order columns in antis. A bank occupied the building until 1967; in 1970 it was occupied by the library.

It was added to the National Register of Historic Places in 1994.
