= First Methodist Episcopal Church of Parksville =

Historic church in New York, United States

- U.S. National Register of Historic Places
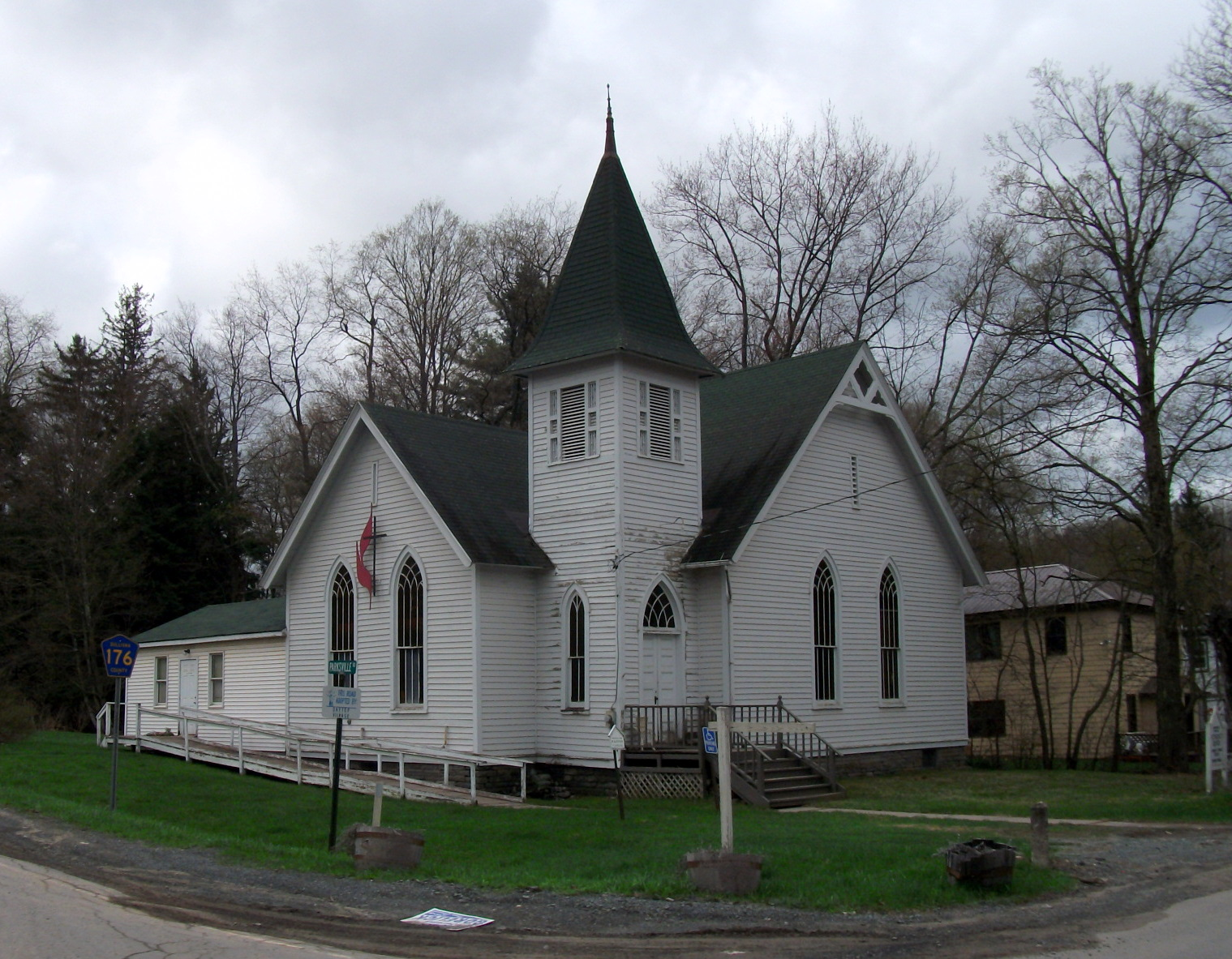
- First Methodist Episcopal Church of Parksville, April 2011

- Location within New York Location within the United States
- Location: 10 Short Ave., Parksville, New York
- Coordinates: 41°51′21″N 74°45′32″W
- Area: 1.9 acres (0.77 ha)
- Built: 1898
- Architectural style: Late Victorian
- NRHP reference No.: 01000575
- Added to NRHP: May 30, 2001

First Methodist Episcopal Church of Parksville, also known as Parksville United Methodist Church, is a historic Methodist Episcopal church at 10 Short Avenue in Parksville, Sullivan County, New York. It was built in 1898 and is a small, L-shaped, wood-frame building with clapboard siding. It features an entrance tower surmounted by a small spire. Also on the property is the Parksville cemetery.

It was added to the National Register of Historic Places in 2001.
