= Page House (Cohecton, New York) =

Historic house in New York, United States

- U.S. National Register of Historic Places
- Location within New York Location within the United States
- Location: 59 C. Meyer Rd., Cochecton, New York
- Coordinates: 41°41′1″N 75°2′53″W
- Area: 2 acres (0.81 ha)
- Built: 1903
- Architectural style: Queen Anne
- MPS: Upper Delaware Valley, New York and Pennsylvania MPS
- NRHP reference No.: 92001601
- Added to NRHP: November 27, 1992

Page House is a historic home located at Cochecton in Sullivan County, New York. It was built in 1892 is a large two story, cross gabled, frame Queen Anne style dwelling. It features asymmetrical massing, picturesque roofline, domed corner tower, decorative shingled surfaces, and an elaborately detailed verandah. An extension was added in 1905. Also on the property are a springhouse and small barn.

It was added to the National Register of Historic Places in 1992.
