= Parsonage Road Historic District =

Historic district in New York, United States

- U.S. National Register of Historic Places
- U.S. Historic district
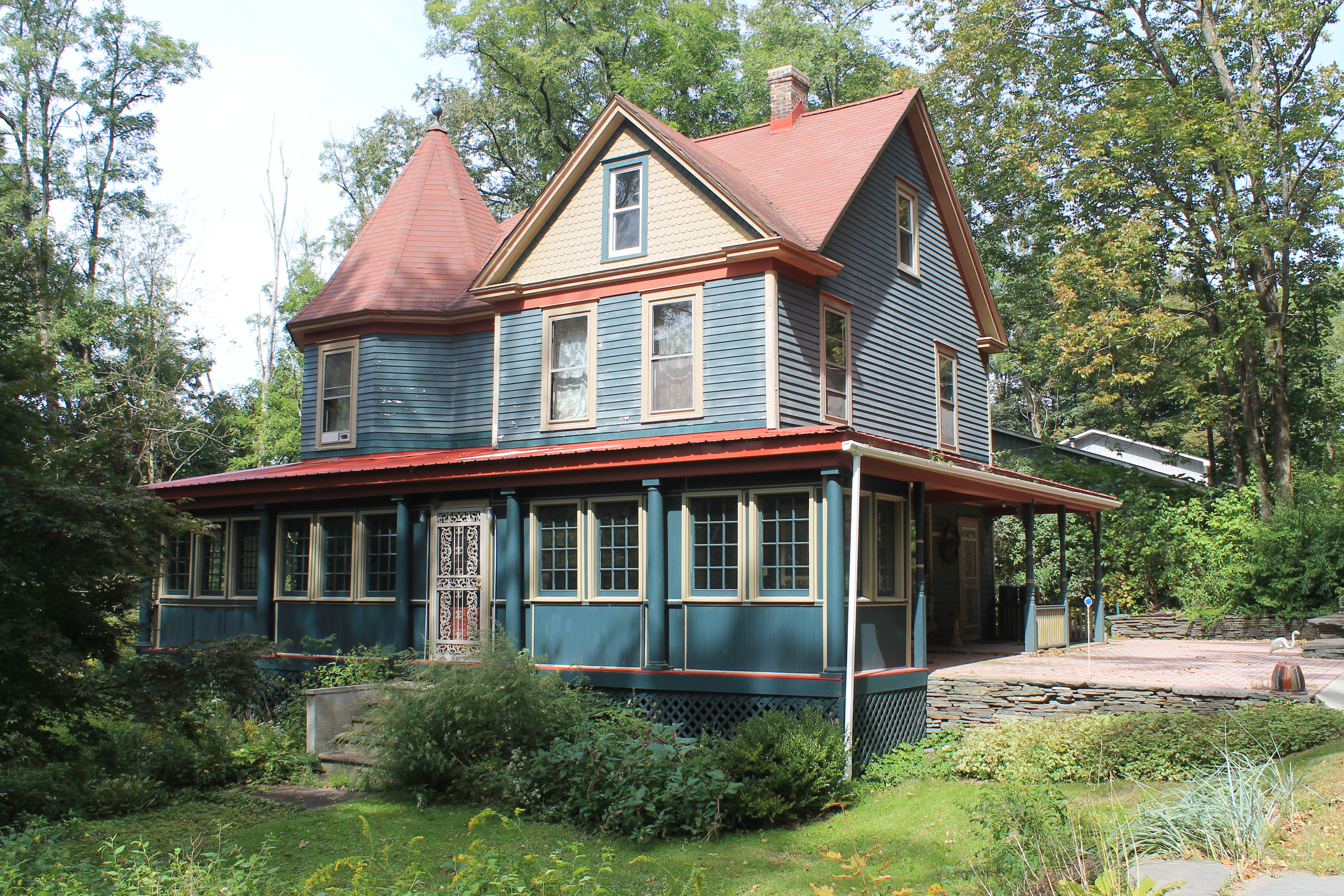
- One of the houses in the Parsonage Road Historic District

- Location within New York Location within the United States
- Location: Parsonage Rd., Cochecton, New York
- Coordinates: 41°42′31″N 75°3′40″W
- Area: 9 acres (3.6 ha)
- Architectural style: Greek Revival, Queen Anne, Federal
- MPS: Upper Delaware Valley, New York and Pennsylvania MPS
- NRHP reference No.: 92001600
- Added to NRHP: November 27, 1992

Parsonage Road Historic District is a national historic district located at Cochecton in Sullivan County, New York. The district includes 10 contributing buildings. The district included houses and related outbuildings located along a short street set in a natural landscape. They were built between about 1820 and 1900 and reflect a number of popular 19th-century architectural styles including Federal, Greek Revival, and Queen Anne style.

It was listed on the National Register of Historic Places in 1992.
