= Hortonville, New York =

- Census-designated place
- Location of Hortonville in Sullivan County, New York
- Coordinates: 41°45′51″N 75°01′49″W
- Country: United States
- State: New York
- County: Sullivan

Area
  - Total: 0.76 sq mi (1.96 km^{2})
  - Land: 0.76 sq mi (1.96 km^{2})
  - Water: 0 sq mi (0.00 km^{2})
- Elevation: 804 ft (245 m)

Population (2020)
  - Total: 180
  - Density: 238.2/sq mi (91.96/km^{2})
- Time zone: UTC-5 (Eastern (EST))
  - Summer (DST): UTC-4 (EDT)
- ZIP code: 12745
- Area code: 845
- GNIS feature ID: 953262

Hortonville is a census-designated place in the town of Delaware, Sullivan County, New York, United States. As of the 2020 census, Hortonville had a population of 180. Its ZIP code is 12745.

Hortonville is the birthplace of explorer Frederick Cook, famous for his claim of being the first man to reach the North Pole on April 21, 1908.

== Demographics ==
Historical population
Census	Pop.	Note	%±
2020	180		—
U.S. Decennial Census
