= Lake Huntington, New York =

- Hamlet and CDP
- The former New York Store in Lake Huntington.

- Location within New York Location within the United States
- Coordinates: 41°41′03″N 74°59′34″W
- Country: United States
- State: New York
- County: Sullivan

Area
  - Total: 1.34 sq mi (3.46 km^{2})
  - Land: 1.20 sq mi (3.10 km^{2})
  - Water: 0.14 sq mi (0.36 km^{2})
- Elevation: 1,217 ft (371 m)
- Time zone: UTC-5 (Eastern (EST))
  - Summer (DST): UTC-4 (EDT)
- ZIP code: 12752
- Area code: 845
- GNIS feature ID: 954919

Lake Huntington is a hamlet (and census-designated place) in the Town of Cochecton in Sullivan County, New York, United States. As of the 2020 census, Lake Huntington had a population of 283. The community is located along New York State Route 52, 15.8 miles (25.4 km) west of Monticello. Lake Huntington has a post office with ZIP code 12752, which opened on February 2, 1893.
