= Callicoon Methodist Church and Parsonage =

Historic church in New York, United States

- U.S. National Register of Historic Places
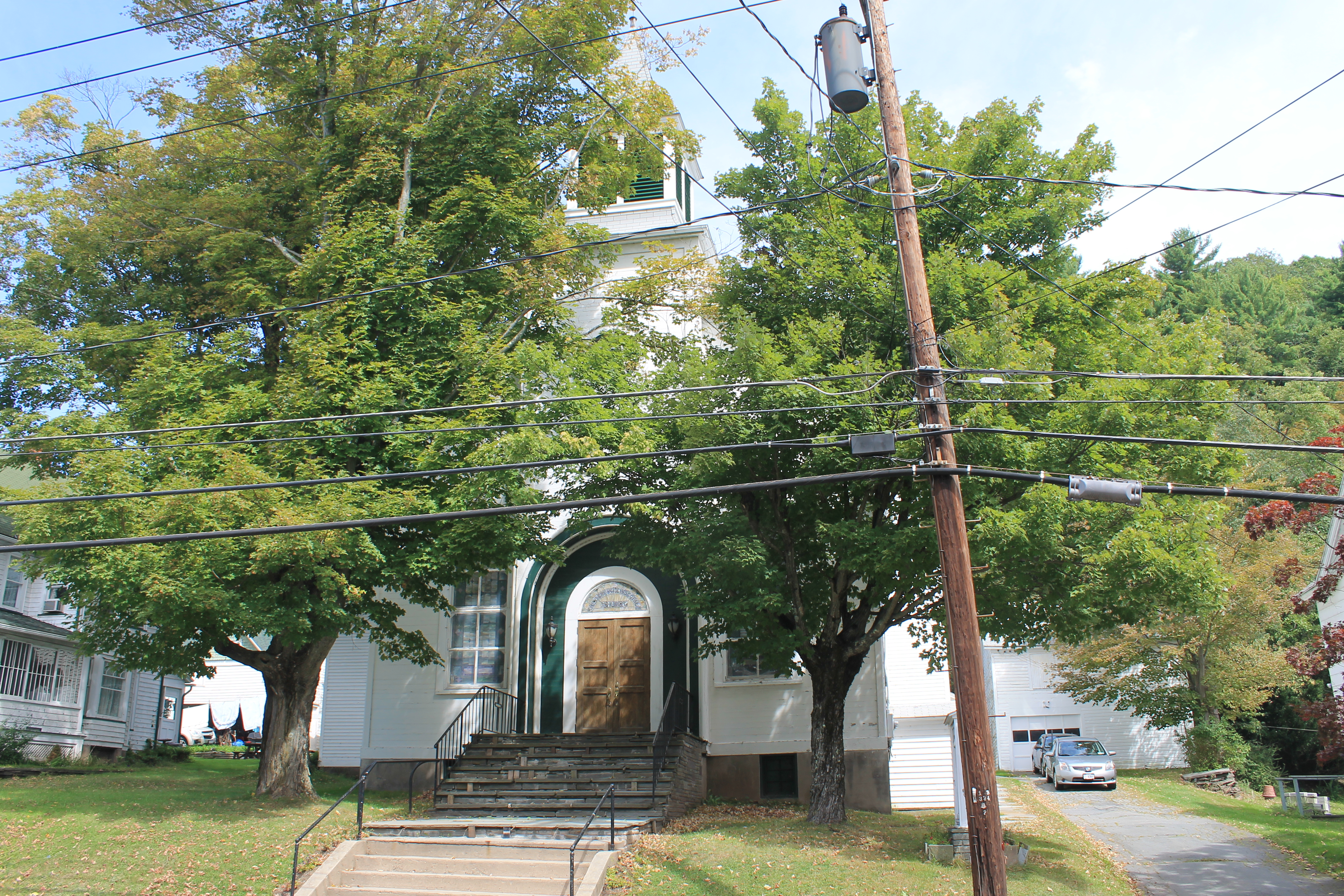

- Location within New York Location within the United States
- Location: Church St. (NY 97) S of jct. with Seminary Rd., Town of Delaware, Callicoon, New York
- Coordinates: 41°46′0″N 75°3′20″W
- Area: less than one acre
- Built: 1871
- Architect: DeForest, Edgar G.
- Architectural style: Mid 19th Century Revival
- MPS: Upper Delaware Valley, New York and Pennsylvania, MPS
- NRHP reference No.: 93001134
- Added to NRHP: November 4, 1993

Callicoon Methodist Church and Parsonage is a historic Methodist church on Church St. in Callicoon, Sullivan County, New York. The church was built in 1871 and the parsonage in 1889. The church is a three-bay vernacular frame building with a central steeple tower. The parsonage is a 2-story, three-by-two-bay, cross-gabled wood-frame building sided with white asbestos shingles.

It was added to the National Register of Historic Places in 1993.
