= Drake-Curtis House =

Historic house in New York, United States

- U.S. National Register of Historic Places
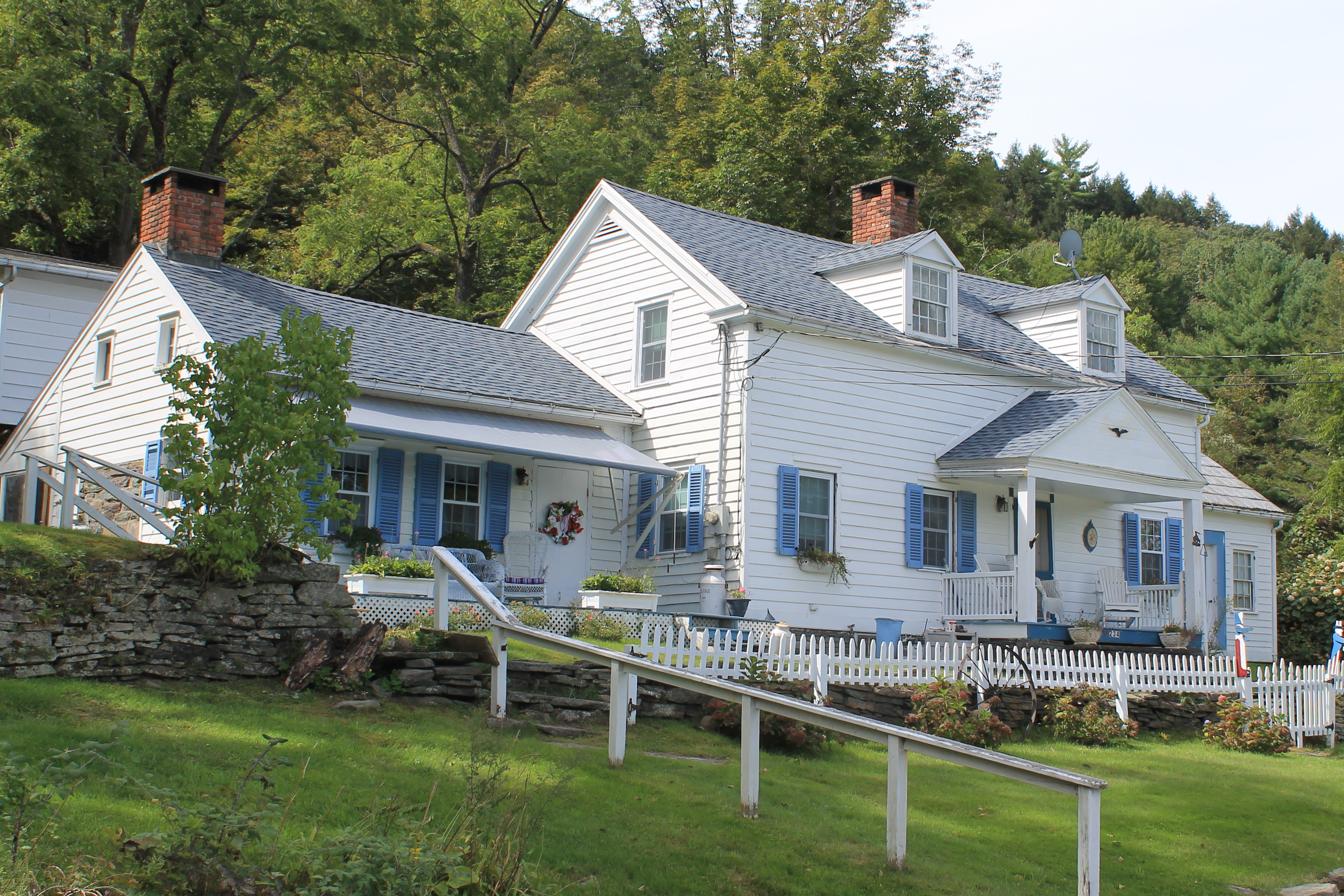

- Location within New York Location within the United States
- Location: Co. Rd. 114, E of NY 97, Cochecton, New York
- Coordinates: 41°42′32″N 75°3′6″W
- Area: 6 acres (2.4 ha)
- Built: ca. 1810
- Architectural style: Federal
- MPS: Upper Delaware Valley, New York and Pennsylvania MPS
- NRHP reference No.: 92001598
- Added to NRHP: April 19, 1993

Drake-Curtis House is a historic home located at Cochecton in Sullivan County, New York. It is a vernacular frame Federal period dwelling. It features a 1 1/2-story central block built about 1810, flanked by 1-story wings added about 1840 and 1850. Also on the property are dry-laid stone retaining walls and a small 19th-century privy.

It was added to the National Register of Historic Places in 1993.
