= Jewish Center of Lake Huntington =

Former synagoge in Lake Huntington, New York, US

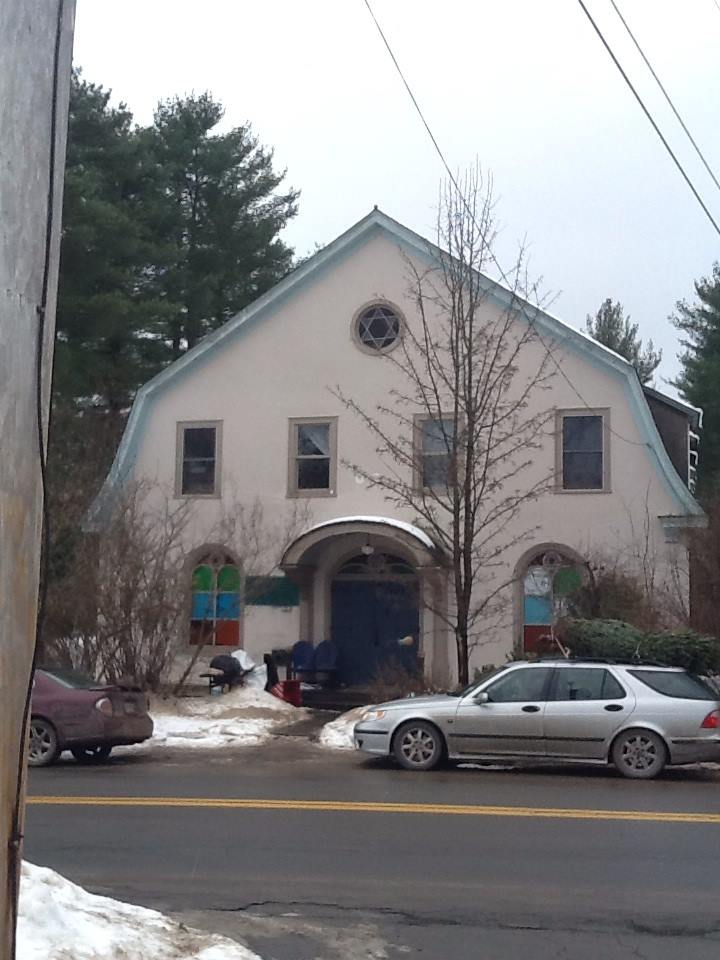

- Location in New York

Religion
- Affiliation: Judaism (former)
- Ecclesiastical or organizational status: Synagogue (former)
- Status: Closed

Location
- Location: 13 County Road 116, Cochecton, Sullivan County, New York
- Country: United States
- Interactive map of Jewish Center of Lake Huntington
- Coordinates: 41°46′48″N 74°56′25″W

Architecture
- Completed: 1896 (as a garage); 1936 (as a synagogue)
- Jewish Center of Lake Huntington
- U.S. National Register of Historic Places
- Area: 0.5 acres (0.20 ha)
- NRHP reference No.: 09001087
- Added to NRHP: December 11, 2009

The Jewish Center of Lake Huntington is a historic former synagogue located at Cochecton in Sullivan County, New York, in the United States.

The former synagogue was built in 1896 as an auto shop and tire vulcanizing garage and altered to its current use in 1936. It is a two-story rectangular building, three bays wide and six bays deep. The first floor is constructed of brick, with a frame story above. The façade is coated in stucco.

The former synagogue building was added to the National Register of Historic Places in 2009.
