= Cochecton Presbyterian Church =

Historic church in New York, United States

- U.S. National Register of Historic Places
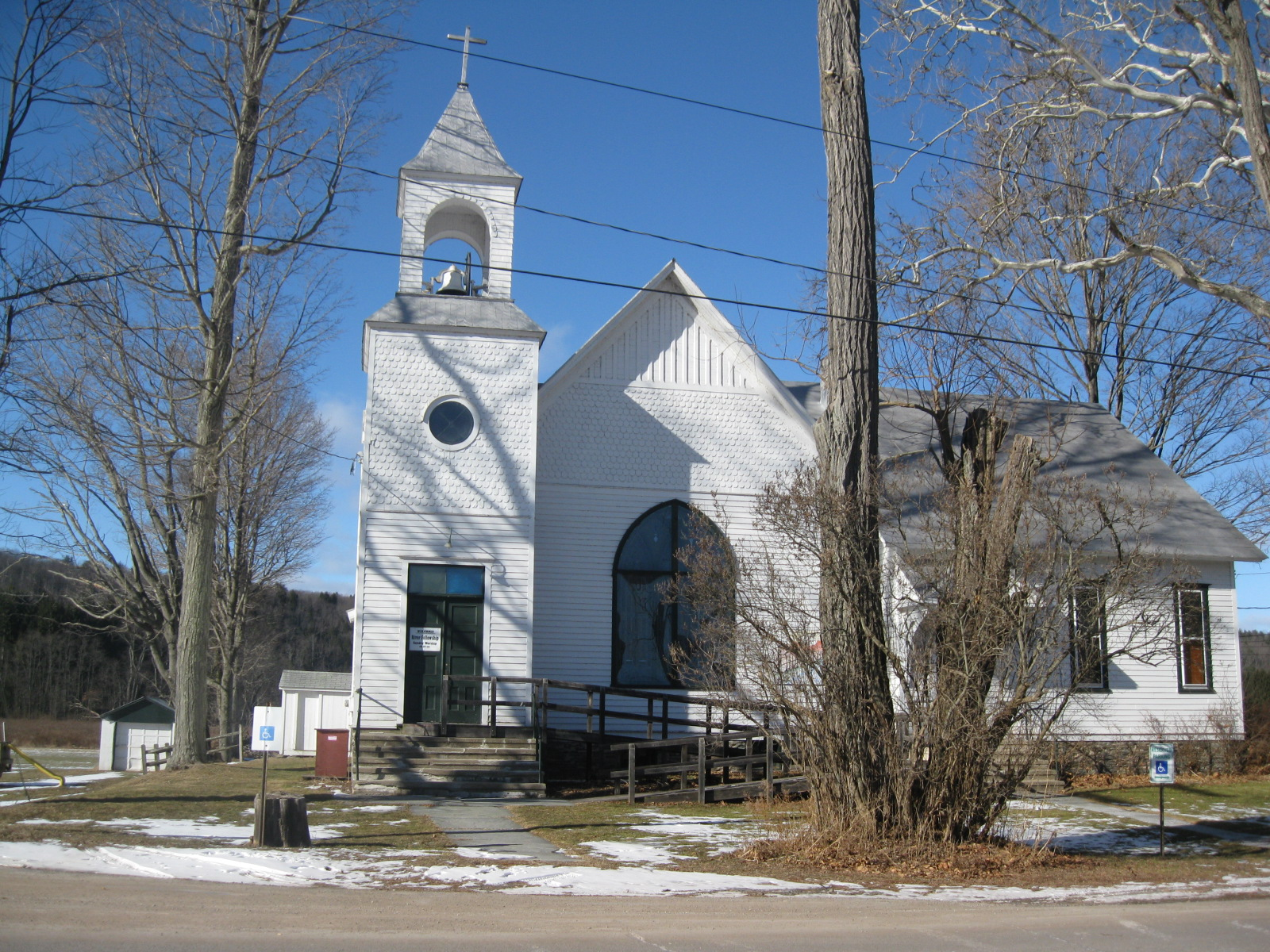
- Cochecton Presbyterian Church, February 2010

- Location within New York Location within the United States
- Location: Co. Rd. 114, E of Delaware R. Bridge, Cochecton, New York
- Coordinates: 41°42′25″N 75°3′52″W
- Area: less than one acre
- Built: 1903
- Architect: Brokaw & Co.; Van Orden, P.B.
- Architectural style: Late 19th And Early 20th Century American Movements, Akron Plan
- MPS: Upper Delaware Valley, New York and Pennsylvania MPS
- NRHP reference No.: 92001597
- Added to NRHP: November 27, 1992

Cochecton Presbyterian Church is a historic Presbyterian church on Co. Rd. 114, E of Delaware R. Bridge in Cochecton, Sullivan County, New York, United States. It was built in 1903 and is a cross gabled, wood-frame structure featuring a corner bell tower. The interior is designed on the Akron Plan.

It was added to the National Register of Historic Places in 1992.
