= Galilee, Pennsylvania =

Unincorporated community in Pennsylvania, U.S.

Coordinates: 41°44′06″N 75°08′23″W

Galilee is an unincorporated community in Wayne County, in the U.S. state of Pennsylvania.

== History ==
The Galilee Post Office opened on August 3, 1848, and closed on December 30, 1966. The community was named after the ancient city of Galilee.
