= Ellery Calkins House =

Historic house in New York, United States

- U.S. National Register of Historic Places
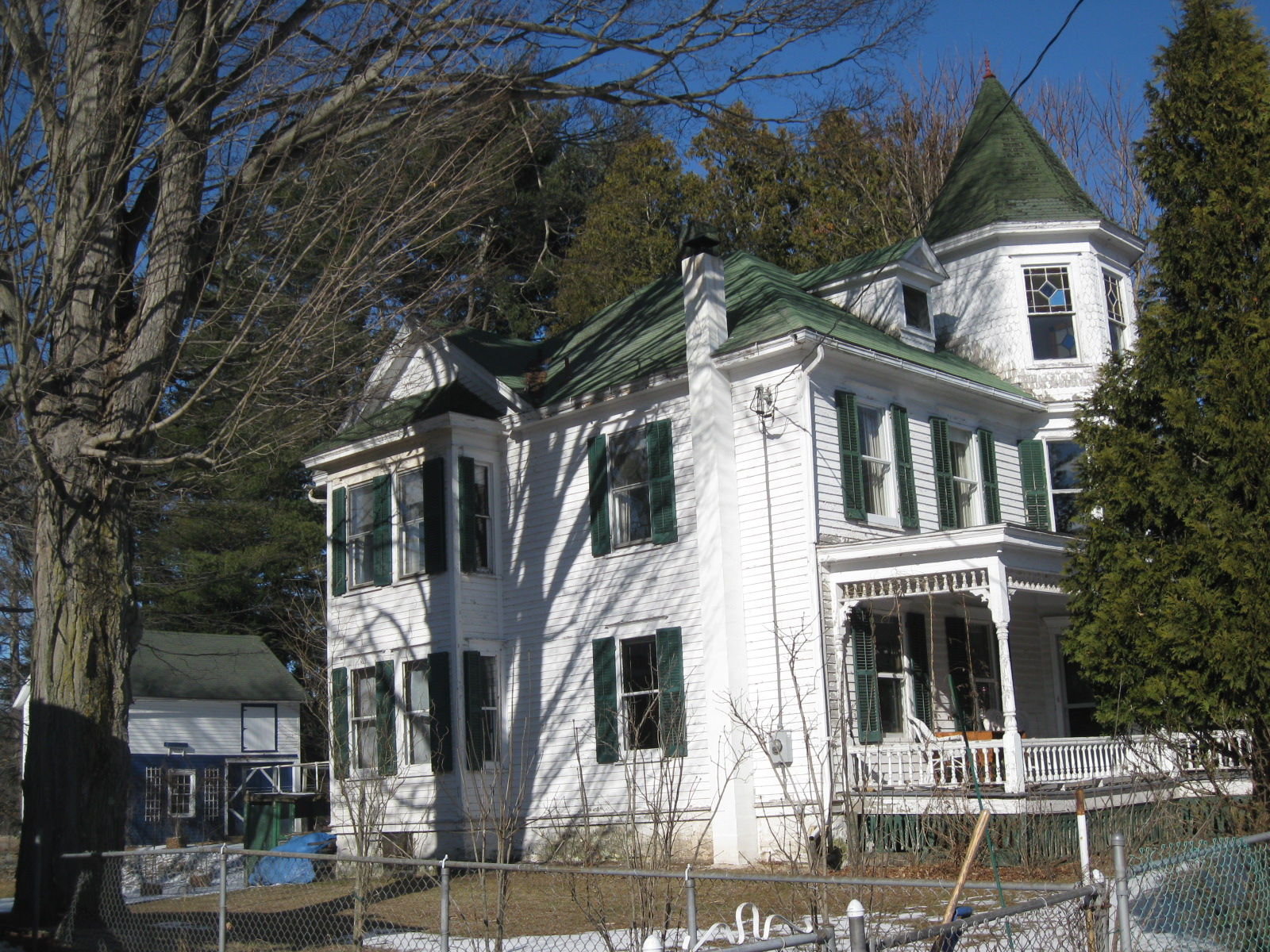
- Ellery Calkins House, February 2010

- Location within New York Location within the United States
- Location: Co. Rd. 114, E of Delaware R. Bridge, Cochecton, New York
- Coordinates: 41°42′27″N 75°3′50″W
- Area: less than one acre
- Built: 1890
- Architectural style: Queen Anne
- MPS: Upper Delaware Valley, New York and Pennsylvania MPS
- NRHP reference No.: 92001595
- Added to NRHP: November 27, 1992

Ellery Calkins House is a historic home located at Cochecton in Sullivan County, New York. It was built about 1890 and is a large, two story frame Queen Anne style dwelling. It features a three-story corner tower with a steep pyramidal roof and stylish wraparound porch.

It was added to the National Register of Historic Places in 1992.
