= Reilly's Store =

Historic commercial building in New York, United States

- U.S. National Register of Historic Places
- Location within New York Location within the United States
- Location: 79 Co. Rd. 114, W of jct. with NY 97, Cochecton, New York
- Coordinates: 41°42′30″N 75°3′45″W
- Area: less than one acre
- Built: 1860
- Architect: Calkins, Ellery
- Architectural style: Mid 19th Century Revival, Picturesque
- MPS: Upper Delaware Valley, New York and Pennsylvania MPS
- NRHP reference No.: 92001594
- Added to NRHP: November 27, 1992

Reilly's Store is a historic general store located at Cochecton in Sullivan County, New York. It was built about 1860 and is a 2-story, wooden, three-by-six-bay, gable-fronted building of post and beam construction. The first floor was occupied by a store and the second was for residential use. Owned throughout the 20th century by J.W. Dermody, and later Frank P. and Katherine Reilly, the general store ran until Mr. Reilly's death in 1957. In the early 1990s, the building was purchased and restored by Bob and Mary Ann White, who owned and operated Reilly's Ice Cream Parlor and Museum from 1994 til September 5, 2000.

The museum featured artifacts of the White's collection from toys and tools of the early 20th century to a model "downtown" hallway, complete with miniature store fronts for the butcher shop, seamstress, post office, barber, and more. A favorite for adults and children was the model train that circled the ceiling of museum and ice cream parlor.

Behind the Reilly Store sits a barn painted with advertisement aimed at the passenger rail line that ran directly behind the store. The Castoria Barn advertises for Fletcher's Castoria Oil, used as a children's laxative.

It was added to the National Register of Historic Places in 1992.
