= Masten-Quinn House =

Historic house in New York, United States

- Masten--Quinn House
- U.S. National Register of Historic Places
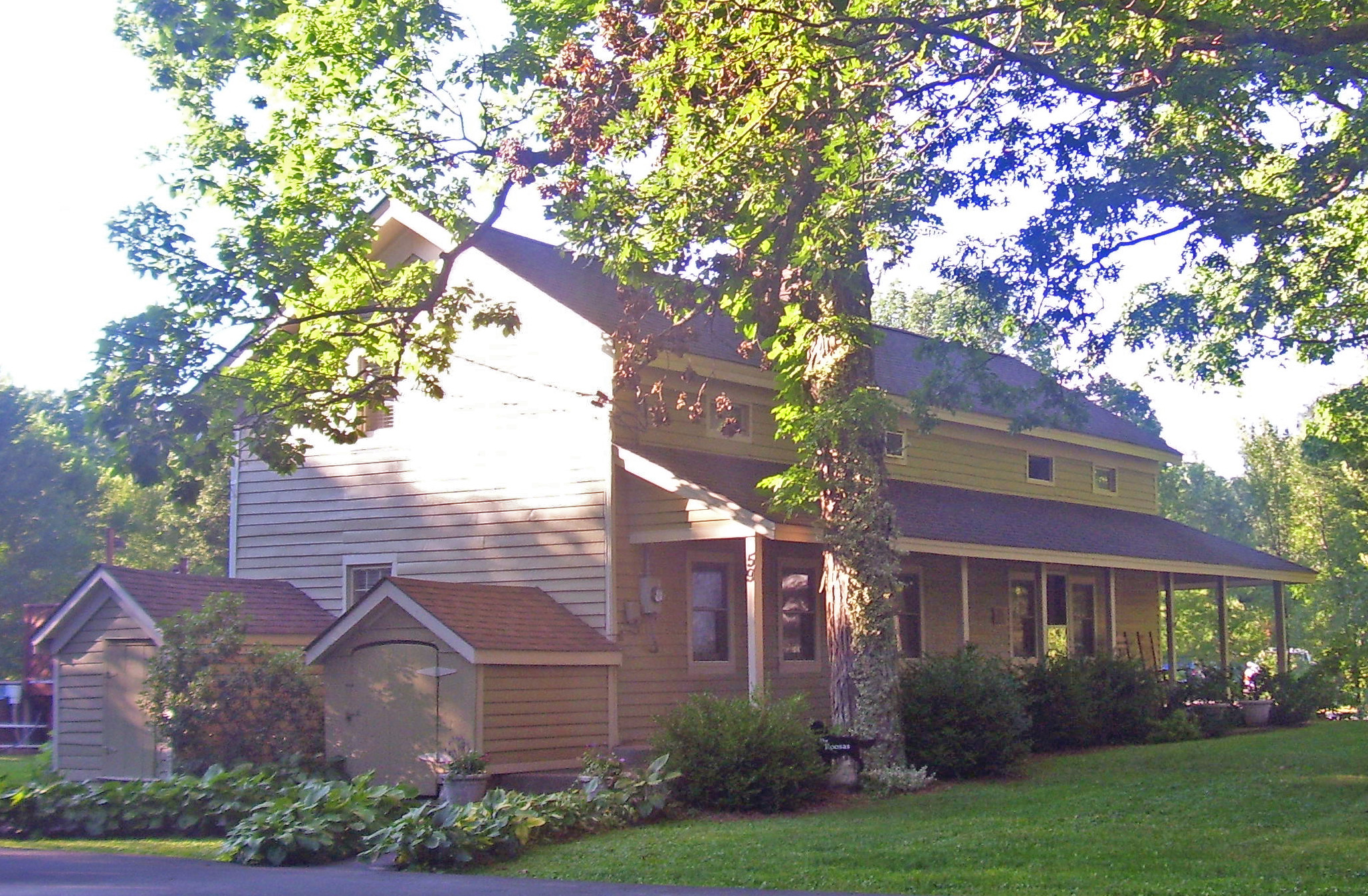
- East (front) elevation and south profile

- Location within New York Location within the United States
- Location: 59 First St., Wurtsboro, New York
- Coordinates: 41°34′37″N 74°28′52″W
- Area: less than one acre
- Built: 1820-1850
- NRHP reference No.: 03000046
- Added to NRHP: February 13, 2003

The Masten-Quinn House is located on First Street in the village of Wurtsboro, New York, United States. It is a wooden Greek Revival house built in two phases in the 1820s, the center of a farm that remained working until the mid-20th century. Today it is one of the few remainders from the area's agricultural past as a canal town.

Lawrence Masten, its builder and first owner, was able to take advantage of the nearby Delaware and Hudson Canal being routed through his property. In 2003 the house was listed on the National Register of Historic Places, the first and only property in the village so far listed.

== Building ==
The house sits on a half-acre (2,000 m^{2}) lot, the remnant of the much larger original farm, at a bend in First Street. Willsey Brook bounds it on the south, and the canal bed, now dry and overgrown, is located in the woods a few hundred feet (approximately 100 m) to the east. The house itself is surrounded by tall trees, including a 175-year-old shagbark hickory tree to the southeast that has helped to date the house's construction.

It is one and a half stories high, five bays long by two deep. It is sided in clapboard, with a gabled roof pierced by a large fieldstone and brick chimney and shingled in asphalt, decorated with a wide frieze and molded cornice at the roofline. The entire structure is supported by heavy post-and-beam timber framing, partially supported by a fieldstone foundation.

A full-length veranda, with shed roof supported by plain wooden pillars and a concrete deck wraps around the eastern (front) and north facades. Two small shed-style wings project from the first story on the south side. The upper floor on the east face features eyebrow windows.

The large chimney divides the interior into two main spaces. There is a large kitchen in the northern section, created by removing one wall, but otherwise the original floor plan remains intact. The flooring, too, is original wide planking, but very little original furnishing remains otherwise.

There is a single outbuilding, a one-story frame gable-roofed structure originally used as a chicken coop. It was moved to the property when the former farm was subdivided, in order to preserve it. It is considered a contributing property to the National Register listing.

== History ==
Lawrence Masten's grandfather Johannes was an early Dutch settler in the narrow Basha Kill valley between the Shawangunk Ridge and Catskill Plateau. His 1,000-acre (400 ha) farm produced several hundred bushels of wheat annually during the late 18th century, most of it harvested by Masten's slaves, said to be the most owned by any one man in what became Sullivan County.

In his declining years he divided his holdings among his sons. Jacob Masten, Lawrence's father, received some in the early 19th century, and again in 1830. Father transferred more to son in the 1830s, including the land on which he had already built his house, building the farm to a total of 100 acres (40 ha).

Masten and his wife Maria are believed to have built the first part of their homestead sometime after their marriage in 1821. This was the southern block, 25 by 17 feet (7.6 by 5.2 m). The chimney was at that time on the north exterior of the house. Shortly afterwards, the northern block was constructed, doubling the size of the house. At this time the porch and roof decoration were added.

A few years later, in 1825, the newly chartered Delaware and Hudson Canal Company obtained an easement from the Mastens and began digging the canal a short distance away. When completed and opened in 1828, this allowed Masten access to goods and markets for his dairy products far from the town of Mamakating, such as Kingston to the north and the communities along the Delaware River in western Sullivan County.

In 1848, Masten built a barn. He made few other modifications to the property, and passed it along to his son Hiram in 1876. It remained in the Masten family for another two decades, until 1895. Afterwards it passed through several different owners until becoming property of John and Kate Linton in 1909. They continued to own it until John's death in 1948 (his wife predeceased him), when it was passed to his wife's nephew Joseph Quinn. It's interesting to note that the house never contained an indoor toilet until after Linton's death, as he felt that the practice was unsanitary. The Linton's were buried in Sylvan cemetery.

Mr Quinn never farmed the property, but lived there as a bachelor until his death in 1981 at which point it was passed to his brother James. The barn was torn down in the 1970s. In 1995, James Quinn and his wife Gloria sold the house and surrounding 7 acres (28,000 m^{2}) to a developer, who then sectioned off the half-acre the house rests on and sold it to Michael Roosa, who is credited for saving the house from demolition. After an extensive renovation, the house was listed on the National Historic Register. In 2008, Michael and his wife Monika constructed a two car garage on the property, which was designed to match the style of the homestead. In January 2018 the home was purchased by Michael and Amanda Spanakos.
