= Bald Mountain (Sullivan County, New York) =

Mountain in New York, United States

- Location within New York Adirondack Park Location within the United States

Highest point
- Elevation: 2,306 feet (703 m)
- Coordinates: 41°54′10″N 74°43′28″W

Geography
- Location: S of Debruce, New York, U.S.
- Topo map: USGS Willowemoc

Bald Mountain is a mountain in Sullivan County, New York. It is located south of Debruce. Rattle Hill is located northwest and Gray Hill is located west-northwest of Bald Mountain.
