= Sullivan West Central School =

School district in the U.S. state of New York

Coordinates: 41°41′27.1″N 74°59′25.4″W

Sullivan West Central School District

Location
- 6604 State Route 52; Lake Huntington, New York 12752; United States

Information
- School type: Public
- Established: 1999
- Superintendent: Dr. Kathleen Bressler
- Grades: K-12
- Language: English
- Campus type: Rural
- Colours: Carolina Blue and Silver black
- Sports: Soccer, Cross Country, Volleyball, Football Basketball, Skiing, Indoor Track, Baseball, Softball, Track and Field, Golf, Wrestling
- Mascot: Bulldog
- Team name: Bulldogs
- Website: http://www.swcsd.org

The Sullivan West Central School district is located in Western Sullivan County, New York.

== Overview ==
The Sullivan West Central School district consists of two campuses: the High School is located in Lake Huntington, New York, and the Elementary School is located in Jeffersonville, New York. Sullivan West Central School enrolls approximately 1,050 students in grades K-12. The Superintendent, as of 2024, is Kathleen Bressler.

== History ==
The Sullivan West Central School district is one of New York's newest school districts. The district includes three smaller schools which merged in 1999 to create the school. These schools include the Jeffersonville Youngsville Central School, the Delaware Valley Central School in nearby Callicoon, and the Narrowsburg Central School.

The Lake Huntington Campus finished construction and was opened in September 2003.

== Sports ==
The Sullivan West Bulldogs compete in various leagues depending on the sport. Most sports play in Class B against Burke Catholic, James I. O'Neil, Liberty, and Fallsburg. However, football plays in Class C against schools such as Tri-Valley.
