= Jeffersonville School =

- U.S. National Register of Historic Places
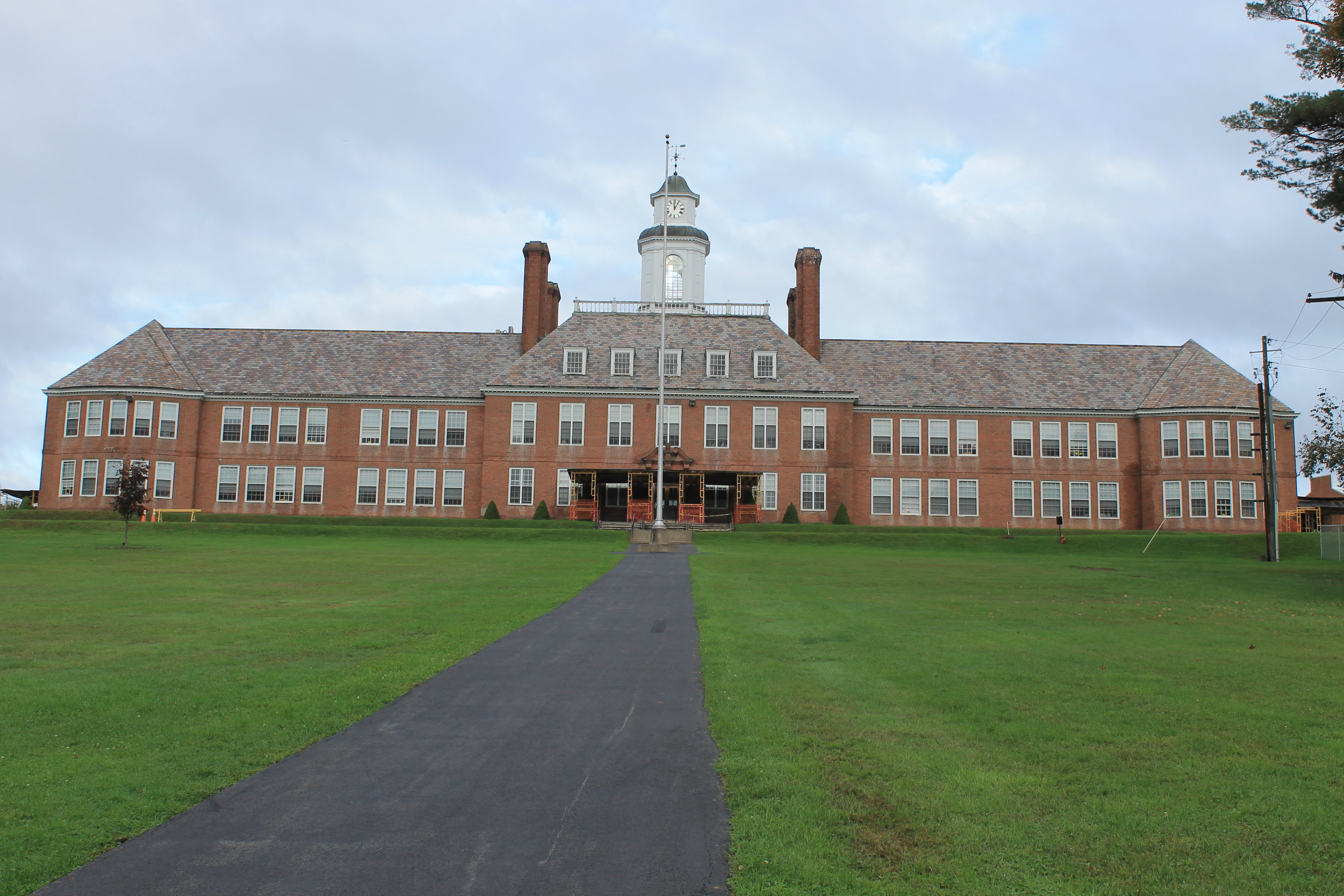
- Jeffersonville School, September 2012

- Location within New York Location within the United States
- Location: Terrace Ave., Jeffersonville, New York
- Coordinates: 41°46′45″N 74°56′25″W
- Area: 14 acres (5.7 ha)
- Built: 1938
- Architect: Fullerton, Harold O.
- Architectural style: Colonial Revival
- NRHP reference No.: 88000519
- Added to NRHP: April 28, 1988

Jeffersonville School is a historic school building located at Jeffersonville in Sullivan County, New York. It was built in 1938-1939 and is a large, expansive, two story Georgian style central school with a below grade basement. The original building is a T-shaped, steel frame and concrete structure with red brick and brickwork ornamentation and surmounted by a slate roof. Architect was H.O. Fullerton of Albany, New York. It is topped by a white, windowed cupola, a four sided clock tower, and a weather vane. It is operated by the Sullivan West Central School as an elementary school.

It was added to the National Register of Historic Places in 1988.
