= Hessinger Store =

Historic commercial building in New York, United States

- U.S. National Register of Historic Places
- Location within New York Location within the United States
- Location: Main St. (Co. Rd. 122), Callicoon Center, New York
- Coordinates: 41°50′10″N 74°56′51″W
- Area: less than one acre
- Built: 1840
- Architectural style: Greek Revival
- NRHP reference No.: 00000584
- Added to NRHP: June 2, 2000

Hessinger Store was a historic general store located at Callicoon Center in Sullivan County, New York. It was built in 1840 and demolished in April 2011.

== History ==
The building was a general store, but also functioned as a post office, dance hall, and hotel / rooming house. It was a large wood-frame building constructed in four phases over a 20 to 50-year period starting about 1840. It was built of heavy timber, post and beam construction and built into a hillside on a stone foundation. The largest section was the 2 1/2-story center section. The second floor of the south wing originally served as a Masonic hall and features a barrel vaulted ceiling.

It was added to the National Register of Historic Places in 2000.

After the Hessingers sold the building, it went through a succession of at least three owners, who failed to keep the building in good repair. Eventually the building became dilapidated and rodent-infested.

In December 2010, the town of Callicoon decided to demolish the building. After a brief court battle the dilapidated building was demolished in April 2011.
