= Wurtsboro–Sullivan County Airport =

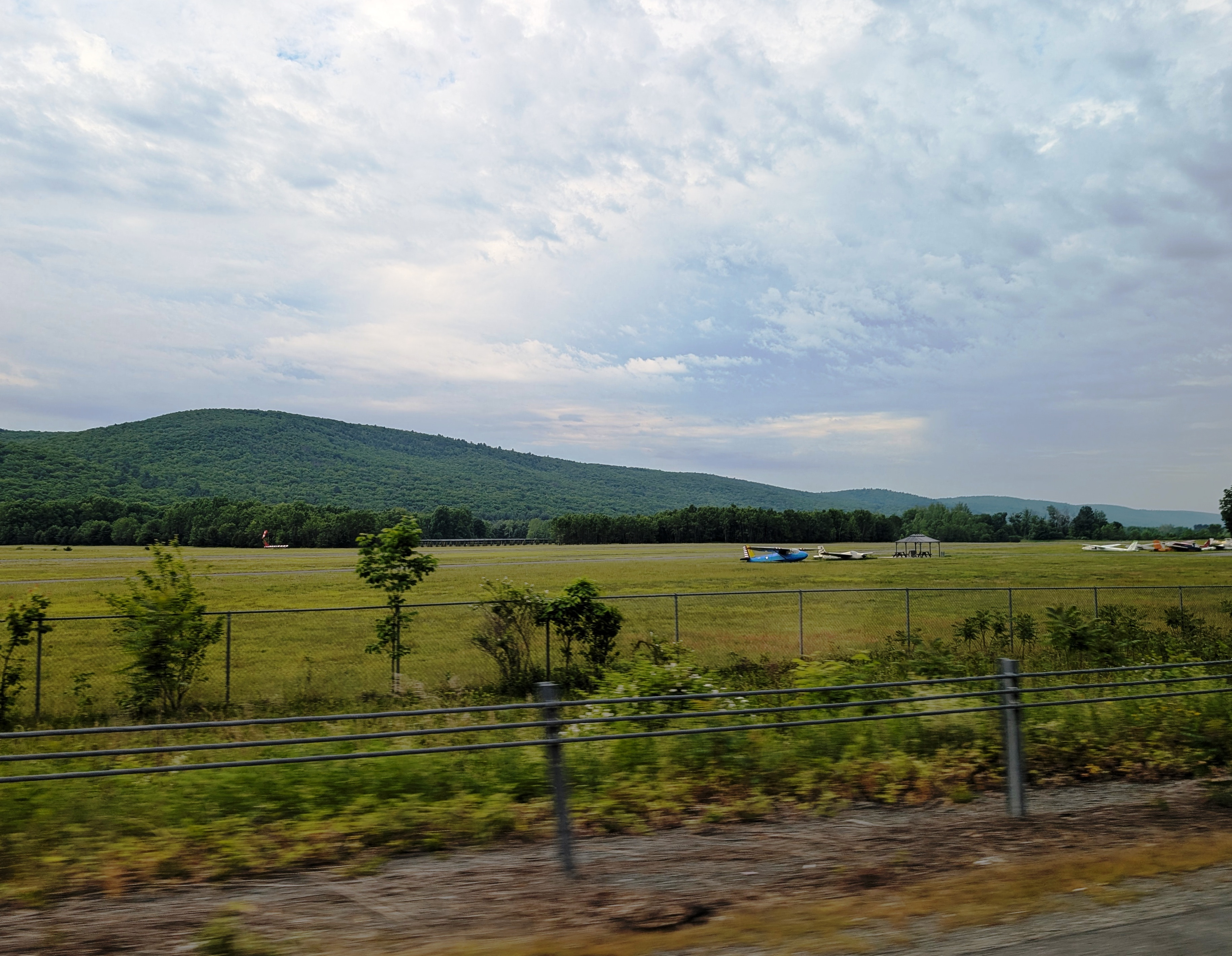
- Airfield as seen from US 209
- IATA: none; ICAO: none; FAA LID: N82

Summary
- Airport type: Public
- Operator: Wurtsboro Airpark, LLC
- Serves: Wurtsboro, New York
- Location: Mamakating, New York
- Elevation AMSL: 560 ft / 171 m
- Coordinates: 41°35′50″N 074°27′30″W
- Website: WurtsboroAirport.com

Map
- Location of airport in New York N82 (the United States)

Runways
Direction	Length		Surface
Direction	ft	m	Surface
5/23	3,592	1,095	Asphalt
9/27	1,100	335	Turf
14/32	2,101	640	Turf
18/36	1,250	381	Turf

Statistics (2007)
- Aircraft operations: 70,000
- Based aircraft: 97
- Sources: FAA, airport website

Wurtsboro–Sullivan County Airport (FAA LID: N82) is a privately owned, public use airport located two nautical miles (4 km) northeast of the central business district of Wurtsboro, in Sullivan County, New York, United States. It is privately owned by a local pilot. It is commonly called Wurtsboro Airport.

It is believed to be the oldest operating glider airport in the nation. The airport is located along U.S. Route 209 and the Delaware and Hudson Canal in the town of Mamakating.

== History ==
The grave of Manual Gonsalus, the first non-Indian settler, is within the airport boundary. His tombstone is dated April 18, 1752, and is one of the oldest tombstones in the state.

Before it was an airport, it was the Helm Family farm. The first known operator of the Wurtsboro Airport was Lee Lord, who gave flying lessons in the 1920s and 1930s. In the 1940s Wurtsboro Airport was bought by Anthony Barone Sr, and his wife Theresa from Hoboken, NJ. Anthony raised his family on the airport, in an old homestead that was there. The Barones kept it a family business for many years, with both George and his sister Patricia running the business. Patricia and George ran a very well known airport offering glider and airplane rides, lessons and rental, with many private clientele from New York City. Including the late Christopher Reeve, who used to fly gliders out of the airport.

The airport is located on Barone Road in the town of Mamakating, just north of the village of Wurtsboro. After the sudden illness and subsequent deaths of both George and Patricia Barone, the airport was sold by the remaining family. In 2006 the airport was acquired by Shalom Lamm. In February 2021 it was purchased by one of the pilots who had flown from the airport over many years. As of 2025 the airport offers scenic airplane and glider rides, flying lessons, aircraft rental, and aircraft maintenance.

== Facilities and aircraft ==
Wurtsboro Airport covers an area of 500 acres (200 ha) which contains four unlit runways:

- Runway 5/23: 3592 x 60 ft (1095 x 18 m), Surface: Asphalt
- Runway 14/32: 2101 x 120 ft (640 x 37 m), Surface: Turf
- Runway 18/36: 1250 x 150 ft (381 x 46 m), Surface: Turf
- Runway 9/27: 1100 x 110 ft (335 x 34 m), Surface: Turf

Services available:

- Glider and Power Rides, Instruction, Rental, Sales and Tow.
- Hangars and Tiedowns.
- Attended 0900 – 1700.

There are 97 aircraft based at this airport: 52 single-engine and 45 gliders.

== See also ==
- List of airports in New York
