= North Branch, New York =

North Branch
- Hamlet
- Location within New York Location within the United States
- Coordinates: 41°48′24″N 74°59′30″W
- Country: United States
- State: New York
- County: Sullivan
- Elevation: 1,037 ft (316 m)
- Time zone: UTC-5 (Eastern (EST))
  - Summer (DST): UTC-4 (EDT)
- ZIP code: 12766
- Area code: 845
- GNIS feature ID: 958694

North Branch is a hamlet in the town of Callicoon, Sullivan County, New York, United States. It is on the north branch of the Callicoon Creek. The community is 3.5 miles (5.6 km) west-northwest of Jeffersonville. North Branch has a post office with ZIP code 12766. It was once famous for its local cider mill, the North Branch Cider Mill.
