= Hart House (Burlingham, New York) =

Historic house in New York, United States

- U.S. National Register of Historic Places
- Location within New York Location within the United States
- Location: 50 Hamilton St., Burlingham, New York
- Coordinates: 41°35′14″N 74°22′50″W
- Area: 13.5 acres (5.5 ha)
- Built: 1825
- NRHP reference No.: 05001535
- Added to NRHP: January 18, 2006

Hart House, also known as Hart Residence, is a historic home located at Burlingham in Sullivan County, New York. It was built in 1825 and is a narrow, rectangular, 1 1/2-story wood-frame building with clapboard siding on a slightly raised stone foundation. It measures approximately 42 feet by 21 feet. The property used to have three seasonal cottages dating to the early 20th century. They were destroyed by the local fire department in a controlled burn.

It was added to the National Register of Historic Places in 2005.
