= Wurtsboro Hills, New York =

- hamlet and CDP.
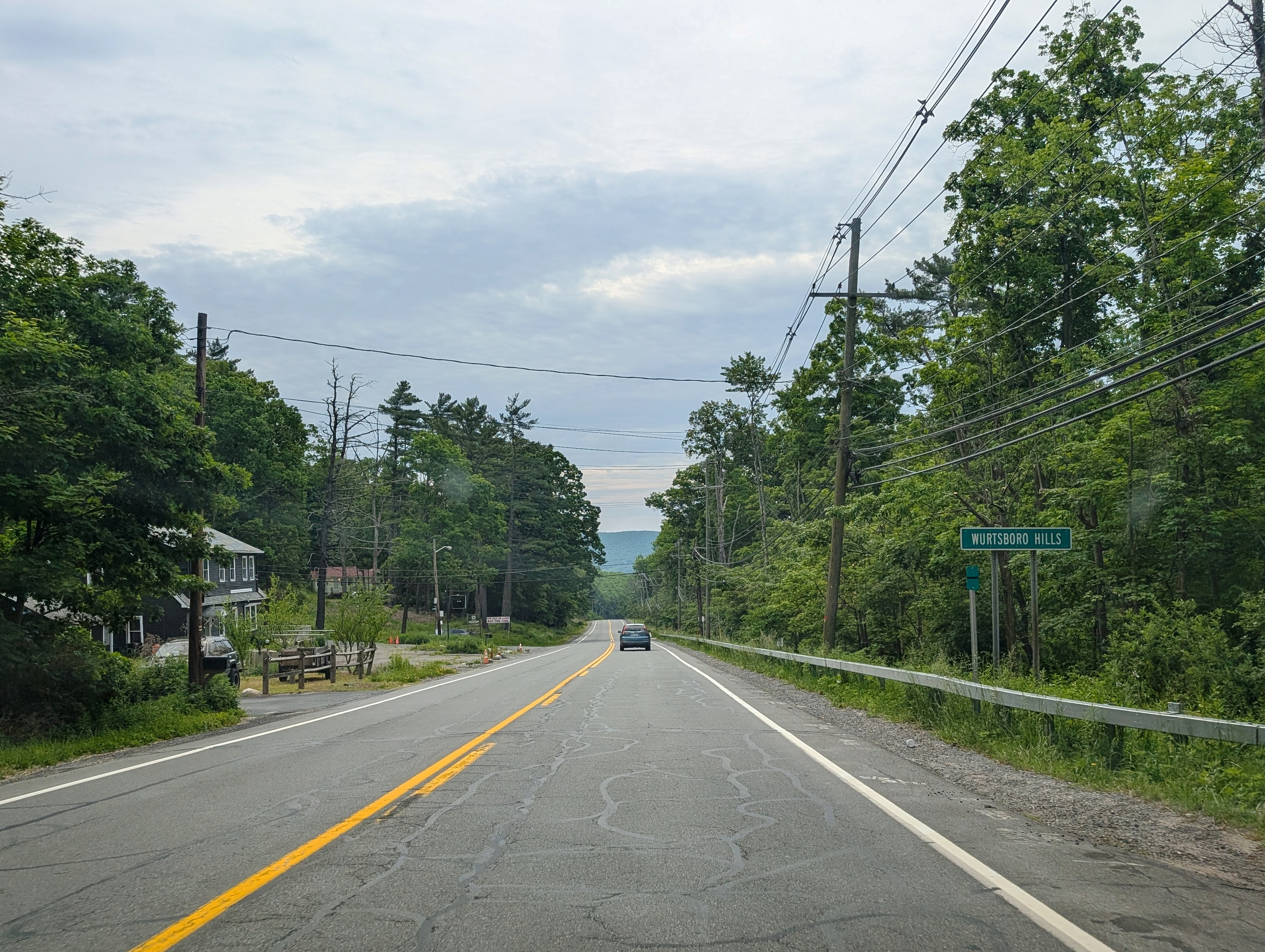
- CR 172 eastbound entering Wurtsboro Hills

- Location within the state of New York
- Coordinates: 41°35′34″N 74°30′8″W
- Country: United States
- State: New York
- County: Sullivan

Area
  - Total: 1.19 sq mi (3.08 km^{2})
  - Land: 1.19 sq mi (3.07 km^{2})
  - Water: 0.0039 sq mi (0.01 km^{2})
- Time zone: UTC-5 (Eastern (EST))
  - Summer (DST): UTC-4 (EDT)
- ZIP code: 12790
- Area code: 845
- FIPS code: 36-44809
- GNIS feature ID: 0979187

Wurtsboro Hills is a hamlet (and census-designated place) in the town of Mamakating in Sullivan County, New York, United States. As of the 2020 census, Wurtsboro Hills had a population of 867. The hamlet is located along old NY 17, west of the village of Wurtsboro. The telephone exchange is primarily 888 and along with 647 in area code 845. The hamlet consists of over 100 bungalows, primarily constructed from the 1920s to the 1960s.

== History ==
The Wurtsboro Hills Owners Association was formed in the second decade of the 20th century, by Charles Tuxhill, a local real estate developer.

== Geography ==
The community is divided into three hills. The highest elevations are on Stoney Trail at 1186 feet above sea level on the first hill and PeeWee trail at 1437 on the third hill.
