= Mamakating Park Historic District =

Historic district in New York, United States

- U.S. National Register of Historic Places
- U.S. Historic district
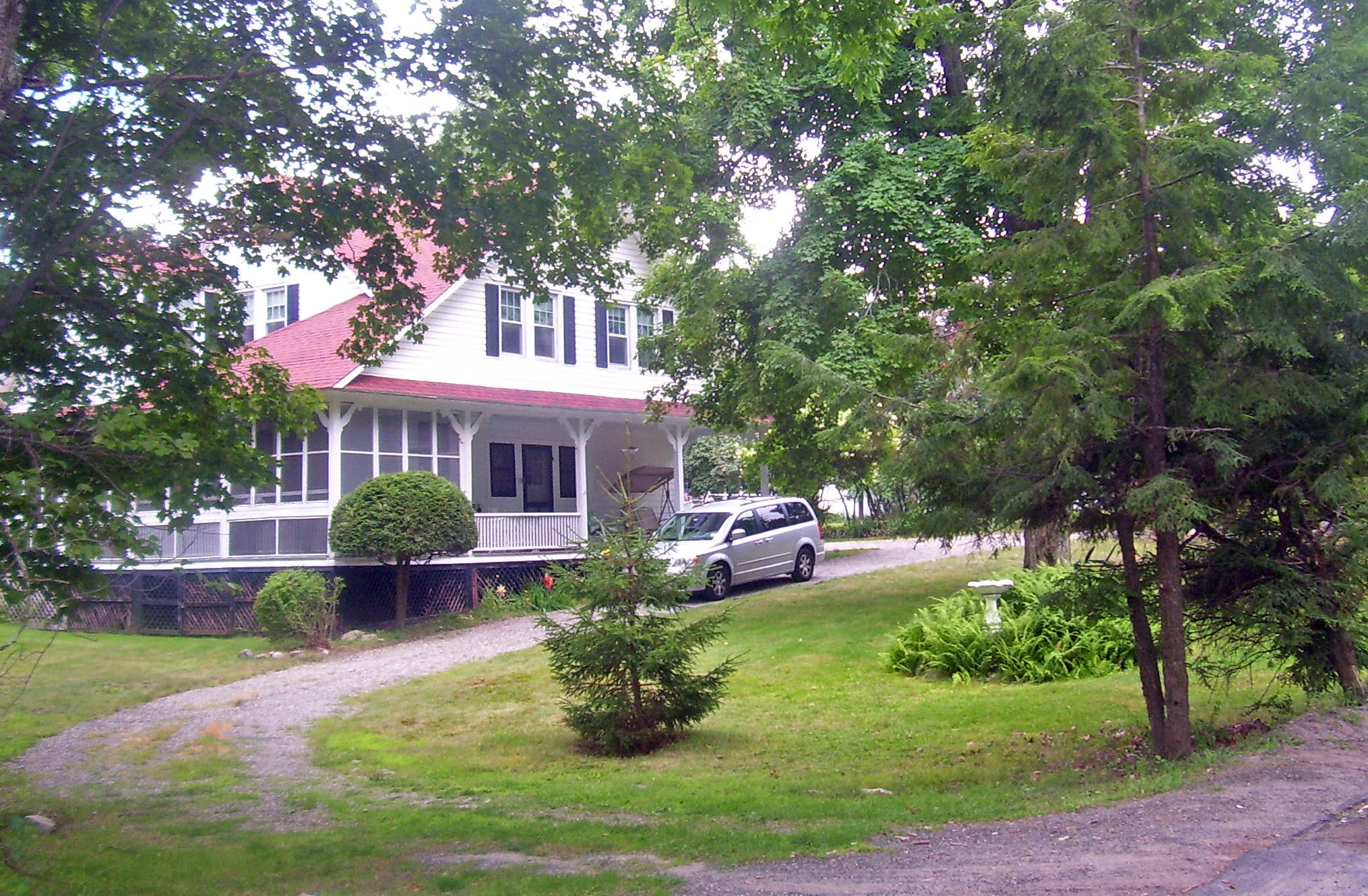
- House on Park Road, 2008
- Location: Mamakating, NY
- Nearest city: Middletown
- Coordinates: 41°36′44″N 74°32′11″W
- Area: 40 acres (16 ha)
- Built: 1890s
- Architect: William Henry Baldwin
- Architectural style: Late Victorian
- NRHP reference No.: 98001393
- Added to NRHP: 1998

The Mamakating Park Historic District is located on the ridge north of Masten Lake on the highest ground in the Town of Mamakating, New York, United States. It is a Catskill vacation community, originally intended to be the much larger Sullivan County Club, built in the 1890s.

It includes several dozen Late Victorian cottages, most of which are as they were originally built, arranged around the site of a former hotel building, and some other buildings from the mid-20th century. These few elements show the essential ideas of the much larger original resort plan. In 1998 it was recognized as a historic district and listed on the National Register of Historic Places.

== Geography and properties ==
The district is a 40-acre (16 ha) area around the horseshoe-shaped junctions of Columbian Road, Mamakating Avenue and Park Road, extending to the north from its northeast corner to include the houses along Park there. It is mostly wooded, with the middle of the horseshoe, where the former hotel was located along with its still-extant tennis courts, the only open space. A small rise near the south end of the horseshoe is, at 1,648 feet (502 m) above sea level, the highest point in the Town of Mamakating.

It includes 48 buildings, all but three of which date to the time of the community's original construction and are thus considered contributing properties to its historic character. The site of the former hotel, and some of its dependencies such as a chapel and casino, are also contributing. Some of the original landscaping is still in place as well.

Most of the houses are frame, built in styles typical of their fin-de-siècle era, such as the Shingle style, after the main hotel. They are characterized by Late Victorian touches such as large verandas, cross-gabling and eclectic use of decorative elements.

=== Aesthetics ===
The plan for what became Mamakating Park was laid out by William Henry Baldwin, an engineer from Yonkers. Its scale may have been inspired by Tuxedo Park, America's first gated community, in neighboring Orange County. It had some curving streets and rustic, forest-inspired names like Fox Trail and Maplewood Lane (never built), but mostly follows a grid layout more typical of wilderness religious camp meetings of the era, which tend to cluster groups of cottages around structures of communal function and importance, rather than curving and winding as streets in Tuxedo Park and similar communities do.

Like other mountain resort communities, the homes in the original plan were sited to take advantage of their natural location. The grid extended north and south along the ridge, with many houses to have been built close to the street where the land dropped off sharply. That would have allowed them to take in the view to the Shawangunks over Wurtsboro in that direction, or the Catskills to the north and west.

== History ==
Mamakating Park began as the Sullivan County Club, a group of New York City businessmen who planned a Catskill vacation community similar in design to Elka Park and Onteora Park in Greene County, but much larger in scale. For much of the 19th century, Masten Lake to the south had been owned by the Delaware and Hudson Canal Company and reserved for use as a fedder reservoir, but with traffic on the canal declining to a minimum as railroads displaced it, it had started to become a summer resort destination for city residents looking for fresh air.

In 1893, the club bought 4,600 acres (1,900 ha), including the lake and the ridge north of it, from a Yonkers family with the intent of developing it into a summer cottage community surrounding a large hotel., taking advantage of the views of the Shawangunk Ridge to the southeast. Recent extensions of the Orange & Western Railroad into Sullivan County made the area accessible within a day's travel to city residents, and after the subdivision of the land, 2,000 half-acre (2,000 m^{2}) lots were put on sale the next year at an initial price of $100 ($3,721 in 2009 dollars) each. Demand was such that the club members were soon able to increase their asking price to $125 ($4,651).

With 359 lots sold by 1894, the club contracted the New York firm of Delhi & Lawrence to design the main hotel and considered building a cable railroad to improve access to the club from the nearby village of Wurtsboro. But in 1897, delayed economic fallout from the Panic of 1893 finally led to the original plans being shelved after the hotel and 20 lots near it had been developed.

In 1902, after the Sullivan County Club was foreclosed on, a new group of investors calling itself the Mamakating Park Company bought the hotel and the remaining undeveloped lots. They promoted the resort aggressively in New York newspapers, with the added bonus of many of the cottage owners renting them out for periods of time, and slowly added amenities such as a multicar garage that reflected the rise of automobile travel. In 1913 they were successful enough to run ads noting that "temperance principles will be adhered to" and that tuberculosis patients were restricted.

Another economic downturn, the Great Depression of the 1930s, led the Mamakating Park Company to fold, and the hotel and its properties were leased to different operators. Late in the decade, newly affluent Jews began moving in (leading some other residents to move out).

The Sullivan mansion became the main building of Camp Lakota.

The Mamakating Park Inn effected the construction of the casino, barber shop and some other buildings in the hotel complex, and was part of the "borscht belt," featuring entertainers like Red Buttons. Relations between the hotel owners and the surrounding property owners were cordial, and residents were invited to attend the Friday and Saturday evening events at the casino.

The owners of the homes surrounding the Inn, led by Evelyn Jablons, organized as the Mamakating Park Property Owners Civic Association after World War II bought a section of lakefront property for members to use and created a beachfront, cabanas, and swimming area. The hotel and Camp Lakota had their own, separate beachfronts.

After the hotel finally shut down in the 1950s, Camp Lakota bought the property and used the buildings. The hotel itself was destroyed in a 1970s fire. During the 1980s, a few new houses were built on the remaining vacant lots. In the late 1990s, the camp began restoring some of the other buildings.
