= Basha Kill Wildlife Management Area =

Conservation Area in Sullivan County, New York

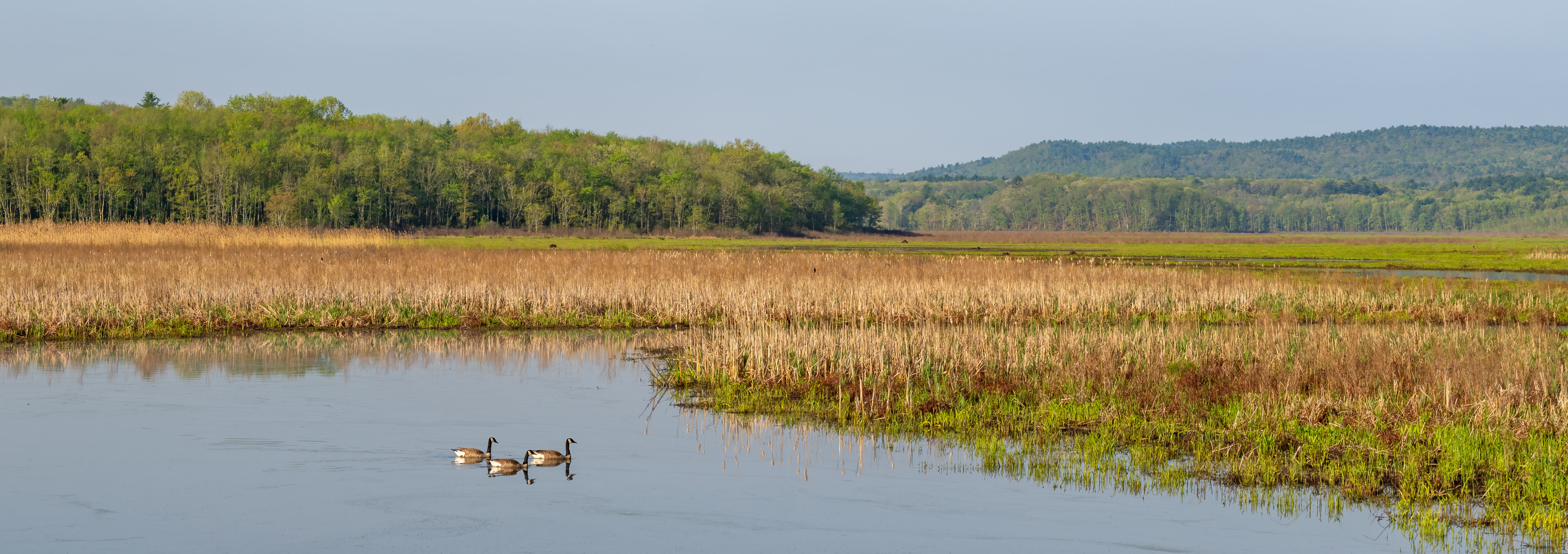
- Interactive map of Basha Kill Wildlife Management Area
- Location: Sullivan County, New York, U.S.
- Coordinates: 41°31′57″N 74°31′26″W
- Area: 2,213 acres (8.96 km^{2})

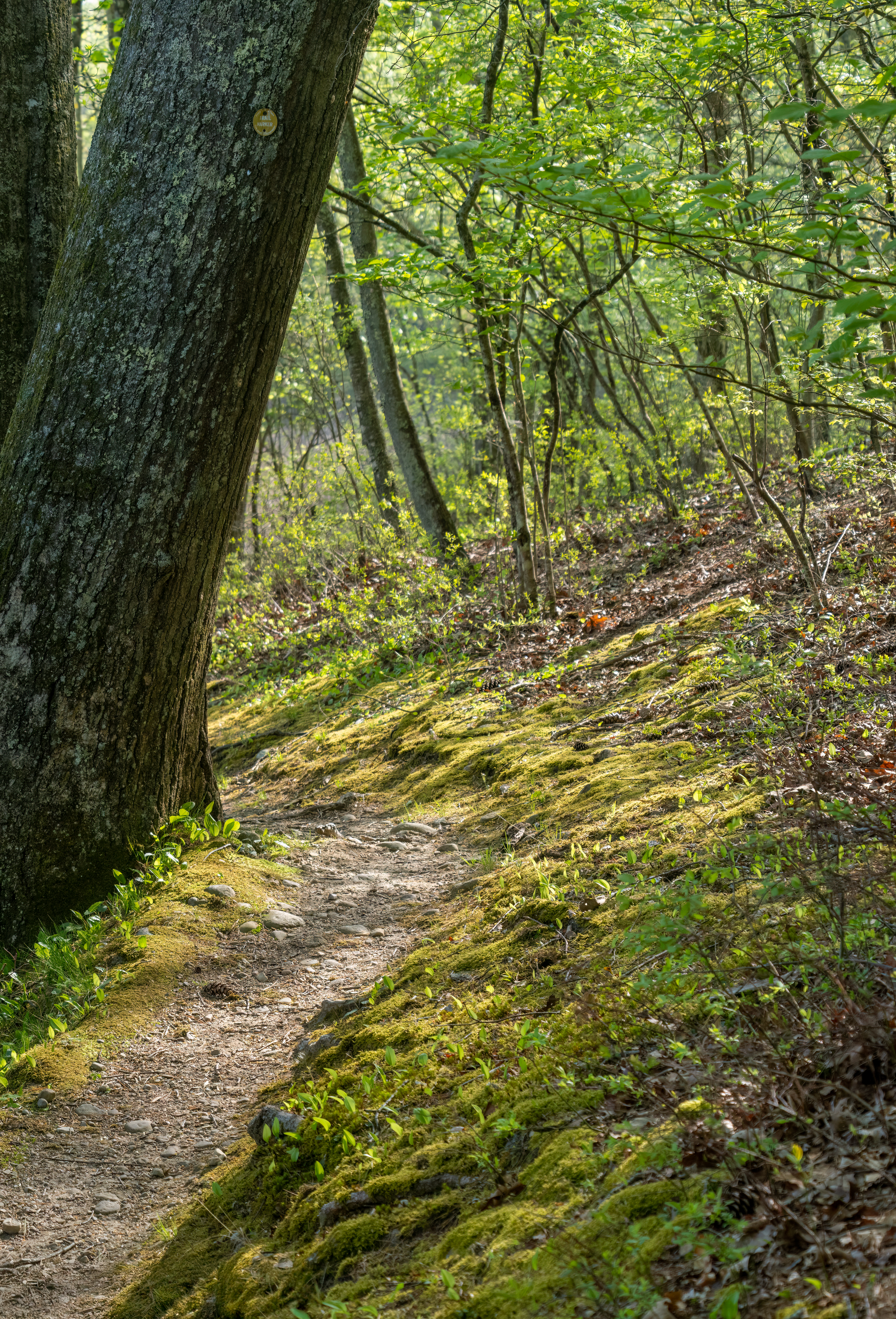
Trail in Bashakill WMA

The Basha Kill Wildlife Management Area (also known as the Bashakill Wildlife Management Area) is a 2,213-acre (8.96 km^{2}) conservation area consisting of wetlands and uplands along the Basher Kill in Sullivan County, New York.

The primary purposes of Bashakill Wildlife Management Area (WMA) are for wildlife management, wildlife habitat management, and wildlife-dependent recreation. This 3,107-acre WMA contains the largest freshwater wetland in southeastern New York, and is a state designated Bird Conservation Area. Its 1,920-acre wetland is a birdwatcher's dream, drawing birders during the spring warbler migration and spring and fall waterfowl migrations due to the influx of interesting birds. Both bald eagles and osprey are commonly seen from the many easy access points. The forested uplands that surround the wetland provide a peaceful setting where one can enjoy a quiet walk in the woods. There is a substantial chestnut oak forest as well as ponds, fields, marshes, and swamps.

== See also ==
- List of New York state wildlife management areas
