= Beech Mountain (New York) =

Mountain in New York, United States

- Location within New York Adirondack Park Location within the United States

Highest point
- Elevation: 3,117 feet (950 m)
- Prominence: 98 feet (30 m)
- Listing: New York County High Points 10th
- Coordinates: 41°58′51″N 74°42′15″W

Geography
- Location: NNE of Debruce, New York, U.S.
- Topo map: USGS Willowemoc

Beech Mountain is a mountain in Sullivan County, New York. It is located north-northeast of Debruce. Rattle Hill is located west-southwest and Bald Mountain is located south-southwest of Beech Mountain. Beech Mountain is the highest point in Sullivan County and it is ranked 10 of 62 on the list of New York County High Points.
