= Beech Mountain (disambiguation) =

Beech Mountain may refer to:

== Geologic formations ==
- Beech Mountain (New York), a mountain in the Catskills region, New York.
- Beech Mountain (North Carolina), a mountain in northwestern North Carolina.

== Places ==
=== United States ===
- Beech Mountain, North Carolina, a town in northwestern North Carolina.
- Beech Mountain Lakes, Pennsylvania, a census-designated place in Luzerne County.

== See also ==
- Beach Mountains, mountains in western Texas.
