= Callicoon Center, New York =

- Hamlet
- Location within New York Location within the United States
- Coordinates: 41°50′12″N 74°56′48″W
- Country: United States
- State: New York
- County: Sullivan
- Elevation: 1,253 ft (382 m)
- Time zone: UTC-5 (Eastern (EST))
  - Summer (DST): UTC-4 (EDT)
- ZIP code: 12724
- Area code: 845
- GNIS feature ID: 945477

Callicoon Center is a hamlet in Sullivan County, New York, United States. The community is 3.9 miles (6.3 km) north of Jeffersonville. Callicoon Center has a post office with ZIP code 12724, which opened on August 16, 1849.
