= Mamakating, New York =

Town in the United States

- Town
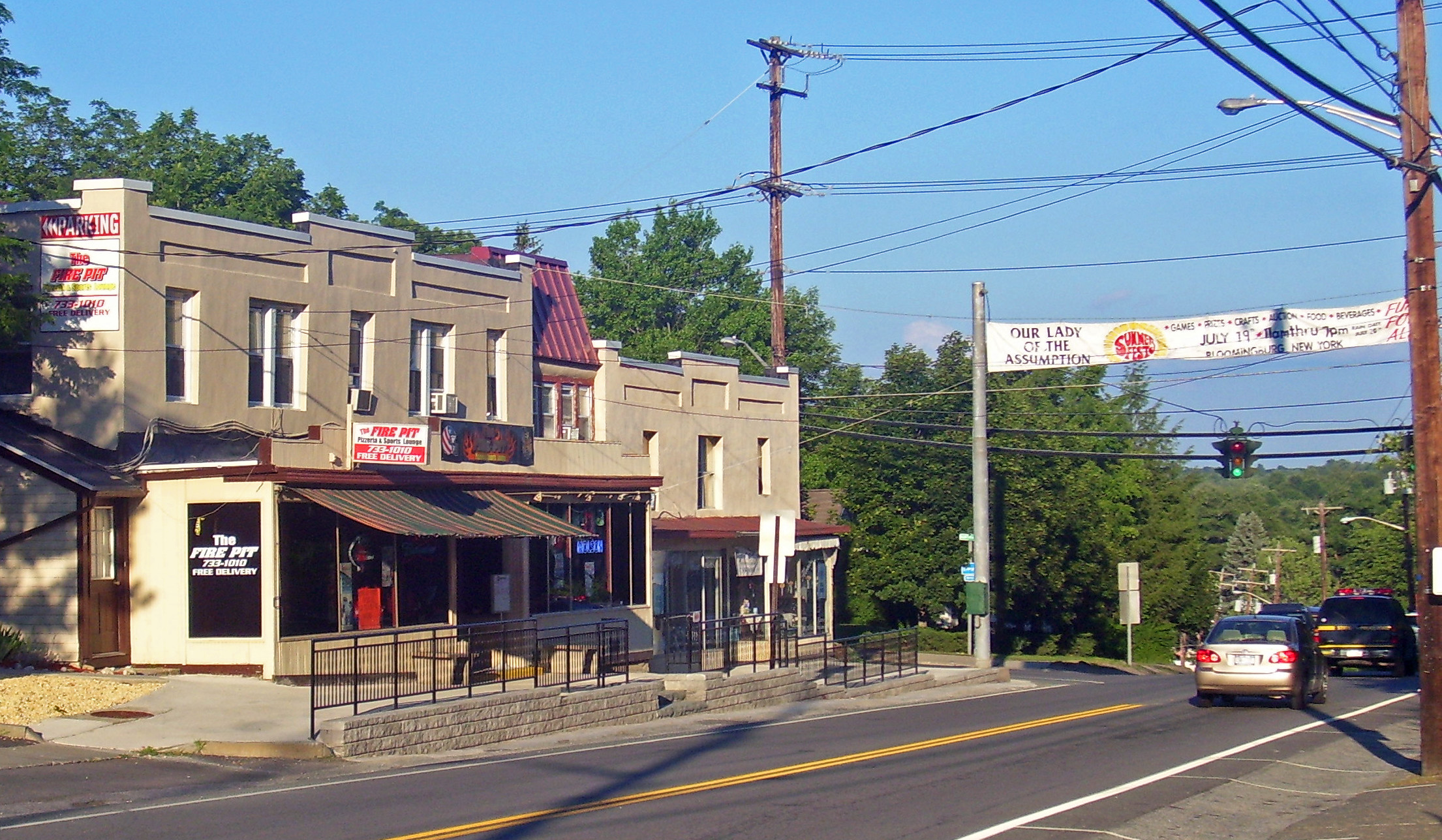
- Downtown Bloomingburg

- Location of Mamakating in Sullivan County, New York
- Coordinates: 41°35′N 74°29′W
- Country: United States
- State: New York
- County: Sullivan

Area
  - Total: 98.67 sq mi (255.55 km^{2})
  - Land: 96.11 sq mi (248.92 km^{2})
  - Water: 2.56 sq mi (6.63 km^{2})
- Elevation: 840 ft (256 m)

Population (2020)
  - Total: 12,655
  - Density: 131.67/sq mi (50.840/km^{2})
- Time zone: UTC-5 (Eastern (EST))
  - Summer (DST): UTC-4 (EDT)
- FIPS code: 36-44809
- GNIS feature ID: 0979187
- Website: www.mamakating.gov

Mamakating is a town in the southeastern section of Sullivan County, New York, United States. The population was 12,655 at the 2020 census.

== History ==
Johanis Hardenburgh, a resident of Kingston, Ulster County, had purchased a large tract of land known as the Hardenburgh Patent in 1706. This land and another patent known as the Minisink Patent were what is now most of Orange and Sullivan Counties.

The town of Mamakating was organized on December 17, 1743, as the Precinct of Mamakating in Ulster County, and was coextensive with what became Sullivan County. Some say it was called Mamacotten. Over decades, the precinct was partitioned into towns. The Town of Mamakating is considered the first town in Sullivan County; its first county seat was raised in the village of Bloomingburg in 1809.

During the early and middle 18th century the construction of forts all along the Old Mine Road (today US 209) was undertaken to protect the European settlers' continued expansion and capture of Native land. There were three forts built in Mamakating. Fort Westbrookville was built in 1750 on what is now the Sullivan and Orange county border and until several years ago it was a restaurant. In 1757 a fort was built north of the village of Wurtsboro and it was called Fort Devans. A building was later added to make it larger and it is now owned by the operators of Wurtsboro Airport. Another fort was built on the east side of the Bloomingburgh Mountain. It was called Fort Roosa and was built in 1731. It is still standing and is considered the oldest building in Sullivan County. Many people traveling the old mine road from Kingston found land that was good for planting crops, plenty of game to hunt, streams filled with fish, and virgin trees to build homes. They decided that it was a good place to settle down and raise a family.

Following the end of the American Revolution, Mamakating was reduced in size by formation of Deerpark, Orange County, and Lumberland in 1798. Mamakating was reduced to its present borders by formation of Thompson in 1803 and contributing a part to Forestburgh in 1837.

In 1788 the first school in Sullivan County was built in Bloomingburg. In 1825 two brothers by the name of Wurts decided to build the Delaware and Hudson Canal. It carried coal from Pennsylvania to the people in New York City. The first canal boats loaded with coal arrived at the Hudson River in November 1828. On their return trip they brought back many of the things that were needed by the people of Sullivan County. By doing this, the canal made money each way on their trip. The D and H Canal helped bring prosperity to Mamakating and all of Sullivan County. In 1899 the railroad came and marked the beginning of the end for the D and H canal. In recent years there has been an effort by interested citizens of Sullivan County to save what is left of the D and H canal. There are many places where you can see what the D and H looked like. One is on the line between Summitville and Phillipsport where a lone stretch of the canal and the towpath, along with a dry-dock have been cleaned up. The county has posted signs explaining the various parts of the canal.

There are many historic places in Mamakating, one of the most important of which is the grave of Manual Gonsalus, the first European immigrant. His tombstone is dated April 18, 1752. Other historic places are the Phillipsport United Methodist Church built in 1823 and the Bloomingburg Reformed Church built in 1820 and now a county historic landmark. There is also an old cemetery located north of Wurtsboro called the Stanton Cemetery where many of the oldest settlers are buried. This is a popular place for genealogy hunters looking to locate links to their past. Up on the east mountain above the Wurtsboro airport there can still be seen the remains of the old lead mine. Some of the lead mined there was used to make bullets for the Union Army during the US Civil War.

In the early 19th century there were several hundred tanneries in Sullivan county with several in Mamakating. The leather from these tanneries was of superior quality and during the Civil War was used to make many of the boots, saddles and other leather goods used by the Union Army. In fact Mamakating tanneries, in the year 1850, produced 29,000 hides of leather from five water and horse powered tanneries.

The town of Mamakating town board asked the town co-historian John Masten to form a historical society in the town of Mamakating. They took ownership of the old school building in Summitville and completely renovated it. Masten eagerly accepted the offer and today the building has an archive room, a great meeting room with many pictures and histories of all the areas of Mamakating, and many artifacts of our area. The Historical Society has about 165 members.

The unique designation of "Mamacoots" has been invented locally referring to residents of Mamakating. It is a humorous combination of the original "Mamacotten" and the suffix "kuts."

== Geography ==
The eastern town line is the border of Orange County and the northern town line is the Ulster County line. US 209 passes through the town north–south, and NY 17 (the future interstate 86) crosses east–west.

According to the United States Census Bureau, the town has a total area of 98.2 square miles (254 km^{2}), of which 95.9 square miles (248 km^{2}) is land and 2.3 square miles (6.0 km^{2}) (2.37%) is water.

The highest elevation in the town is 1,648 feet (502 m), near the junction of Mamakating Avenue and Park Road in the Mamakating Park Historic District. The lowest elevation is 340 feet (100 m), at the tripoint with Orange and Ulster counties where the Bush Kill drains into the Shawangunkill.

== Demographics ==
Historical population
Census	Pop.	Note	%±
1790	1,763		—
1820	2,762		—
1830	3,062		10.9%
1840	3,418		11.6%
1850	4,107		20.2%
1860	3,828		−6.8%
1870	4,866		27.1%
1880	3,845		−21.0%
1890	3,401		−11.5%
1900	3,128		−8.0%
1910	2,922		−6.6%
1920	2,395		−18.0%
1930	2,277		−4.9%
1940	2,407		5.7%
1950	2,632		9.3%
1960	3,356		27.5%
1970	4,319		28.7%
1980	7,717		78.7%
1990	9,792		26.9%
2000	11,004		12.4%
2010	12,085		9.8%
2020	12,655		4.7%
U.S. Decennial Census

As of the census of 2000, there were 11,002 people, 4,153 households, and 2,936 families residing in the town. The population density was 114.7 inhabitants per square mile (44.3/km^{2}). There were 5,629 housing units at an average density of 58.7/sq mi (22.7/km^{2}). The racial makeup of the town was 93.96% white, 2.14% African American, 0.33% Native American, 1.03% Asian, 0.89% from other races, and 1.66% from two or more races. Hispanic or Latino of any race were 4.77% of the population.

There were 4,153 households, out of which 35.5% had children under the age of 18 living with them, 56.6% were married couples living together, 9.1% had a female householder with no husband present, and 29.3% were non-families. 23.6% of all households were made up of individuals, and 8.1% had someone living alone who was 65 years of age or older. The average household size was 2.64 and the average family size was 3.14.

In the town, the population was spread out, with 26.9% under the age of 18, 6.9% from 18 to 24, 30.4% from 25 to 44, 24.8% from 45 to 64, and 10.9% who were 65 years of age or older. The median age was 37 years. For every 100 females, there were 101.0 males. For every 100 females age 18 and over, there were 97.2 males.

The median income for a household in the town was nearly about $41,726, and the median income for a family was $49,615. Males had a median income of $40,811 versus $28,329 for females. The per capita income for the town was $19,451. About 7.2% of families and 10.3% of the population were below the poverty line, including 10.0% of those under age 18 and 9.2% of those age 65 or over.

== Government ==
Mamakating is organized under a town council government, with six council members representing specific wards within the town and a supervisor having a vote equal to any council member on legislative matters. A clerk, highway superintendent, and two justices are also elected.

=== Departments ===
==== Building Department ====
Local management of building permits and ongoing building projects within Mamakating.

==== Parks & Recreation ====
Made up of multiple department heads that each oversee many faucets of the town's fringes, such as summer camps, rental properties and employment within Mamakating's parks and related facilities.

==== Justice Court ====
Mamakating has no large or supreme court system, but is home to a local Justice court. The court handles issues such as traffic infringements, small claims cases and payment of fines and surcharges.

==== Highway Department ====
The Highway Department provides maintenance, improvements and snow removal for Town roads.

==== Assessor's Office ====
Handles the release and collection of censuses and other important forms and dates throughout the business year.

==== Dog Control ====
Primarily responsible for dog registration and the management of stray pets within the town of Mamakating.

For a full, official list of department heads and their related departments, as well as for reference, refer to the town's official website.

== Communities and locations in Mamakating ==
- Bashakill – a marsh in the southern part of the town.
- Bloomingburg – a village.
- Burlingham – a hamlet by the eastern town line. The Hart House was listed on the National Register of Historic Places in 2006.
- Culvertown – a hamlet by the western town line.
- Haven – a hamlet by the southeastern town line.
- High View – a location by Bloomingburg.
- Mamakating Park – a community northeast of Wurtsboro village. Built in the 1890s as a resort community and now listed on the National Register of Historic Places
- Mount Prosper – a hamlet west of Wurtsboro village.
- Phillipsport – a hamlet north of Wurtsboro on Route 209.
- Roosa Gap – a location west of Burlingham.
- Spring Glen – part of the Ulster County hamlet along Route 209 is in Mamakating.
- Summitville – a hamlet north of Wurtsboro on Route 209.
- Winterton – a hamlet in the southeastern part of the town.
- Wurtsboro – a village.
- Wurtsboro Hills – a hamlet northwest of Wurtsboro village.
- Wurtsboro–Sullivan County Airport (N82) – an airport north of Wurtsboro village.
- Yankee Lake – a hamlet west of Wurtsboro village and adjacent to an eponymous lake.
