= WJFF =

Radio station in Jeffersonville, New York

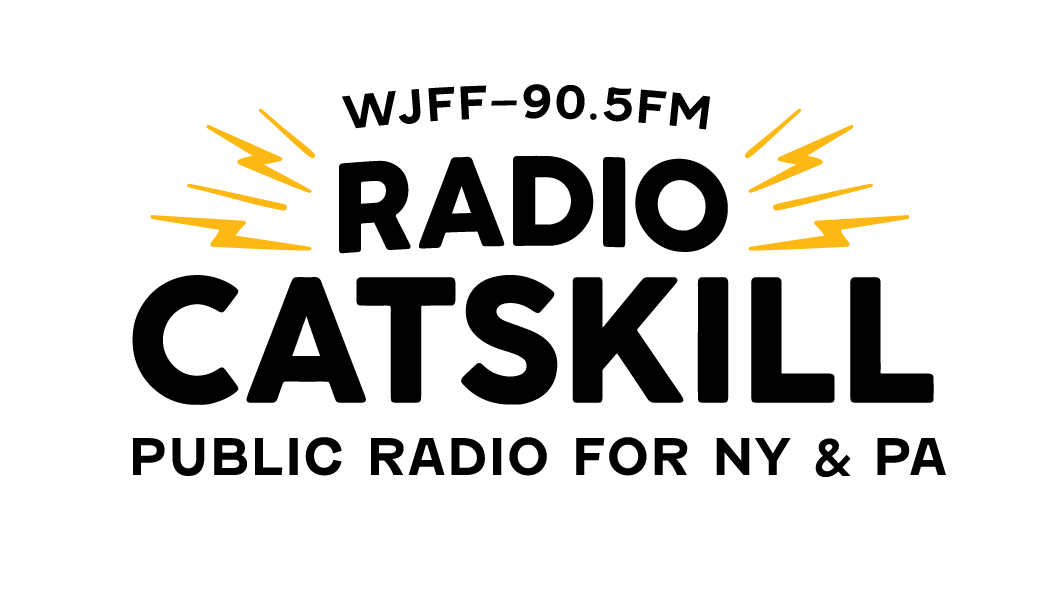
- Jeffersonville, New York; United States
- Broadcast area: Catskill Mountains, Northeast Pennsylvania
- Frequency: 90.5 MHz
- Branding: Radio Catskill

Programming
- Format: Public radio
- Affiliations: NPR; American Public Media; Public Radio Exchange; Pacifica Radio

Ownership
- Owner: Radio Catskill, Inc.

History
- First air date: January 20, 1990
- Call sign meaning: Jeffersonville

Technical information
- Licensing authority: FCC
- Facility ID: 54516
- Class: B1
- ERP: 3,700 watts
- HAAT: 192 meters (630 ft)
- Transmitter coordinates: 41°48′04.2″N 74°47′03.5″W

Links
- Public license information: Public file; LMS
- Webcast: Listen Live
- Website: wjffradio.org

WJFF (90.5 FM) is a non-commercial, listener-supported public radio station licensed to Jeffersonville, New York and serving the Catskill Mountains of New York and Northeast Pennsylvania.

WJFF has an effective radiated power (ERP) of 3,200 watts. The transmitter is approximately two miles west of Liberty, New York, off Old Loomis Road.

== History ==
In January 1988, Radio Catskill, Inc., received a construction permit for WJFF. The radio station's studio building was built on the north side of the Jefferson Lake dam. Spearheaded by Malcolm Brown and the enthusiasm of local residents, the station was constructed almost entirely by volunteer labor.

The station signed on January 20, 1990. Initially the station transmitted with a power of 830 watts. This was increased to 3,700 watts in early 1996.

1996 was also the year that Catskill Radio Inc. applied for and received authorization to build its former Monticello FM translator, 94.5 W233AH. Radio Catskill sold the translator effective November 8, 2023.

Previous logo

== Programming ==
The schedule is a mix of local, national and international programming, including several NPR shows (Morning Edition, All Things Considered and Fresh Air with Terry Gross) and the BBC World Service.

== See also ==
- List of community radio stations in the United States
