= Haven, New York =

Haven
- hamlet
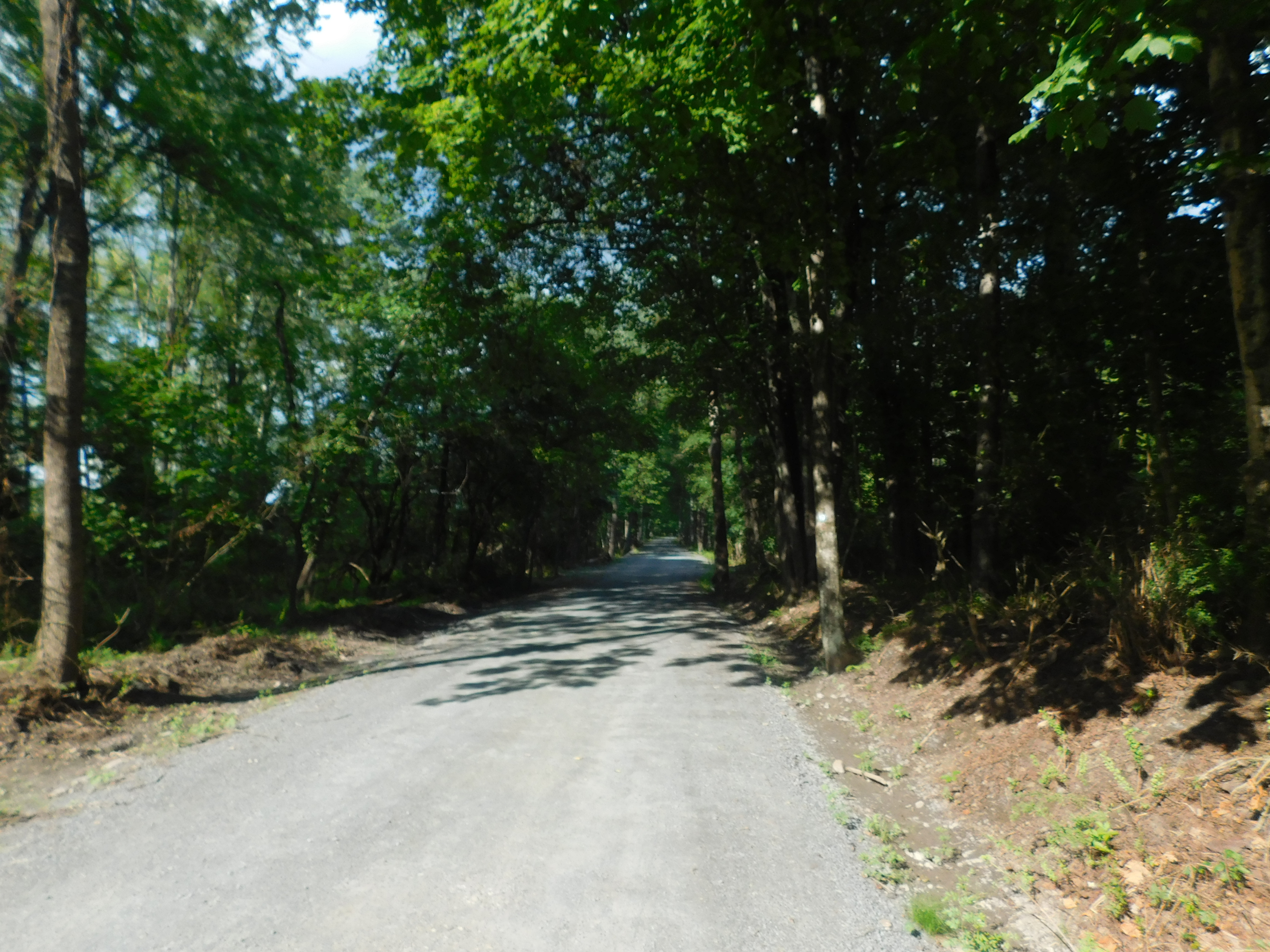
- The former New York, Ontario and Western Railroad station site at Haven in August 2026.

- Location of Haven in New York
- Coordinates: 41°32′28.32″N 74°31′26.60″W
- Country: United States
- State: New York
- County: Sullivan

Haven is a hamlet south of Wurtsboro, New York, at the intersection of U.S. Route 209 and Haven Road which crosses the Basha Kill to the South Road. The area is known by the old Moose Lodge which now appears to be closed. The Brownsville cemetery is at the end of Tow Path Road, a cemetery from the 1830s situated in the woods above the Basha Kill. The hamlet also has Giovanni's Inn, which is an Italian restaurant.
