= Callicoon, New York =

Callicoon
- Town
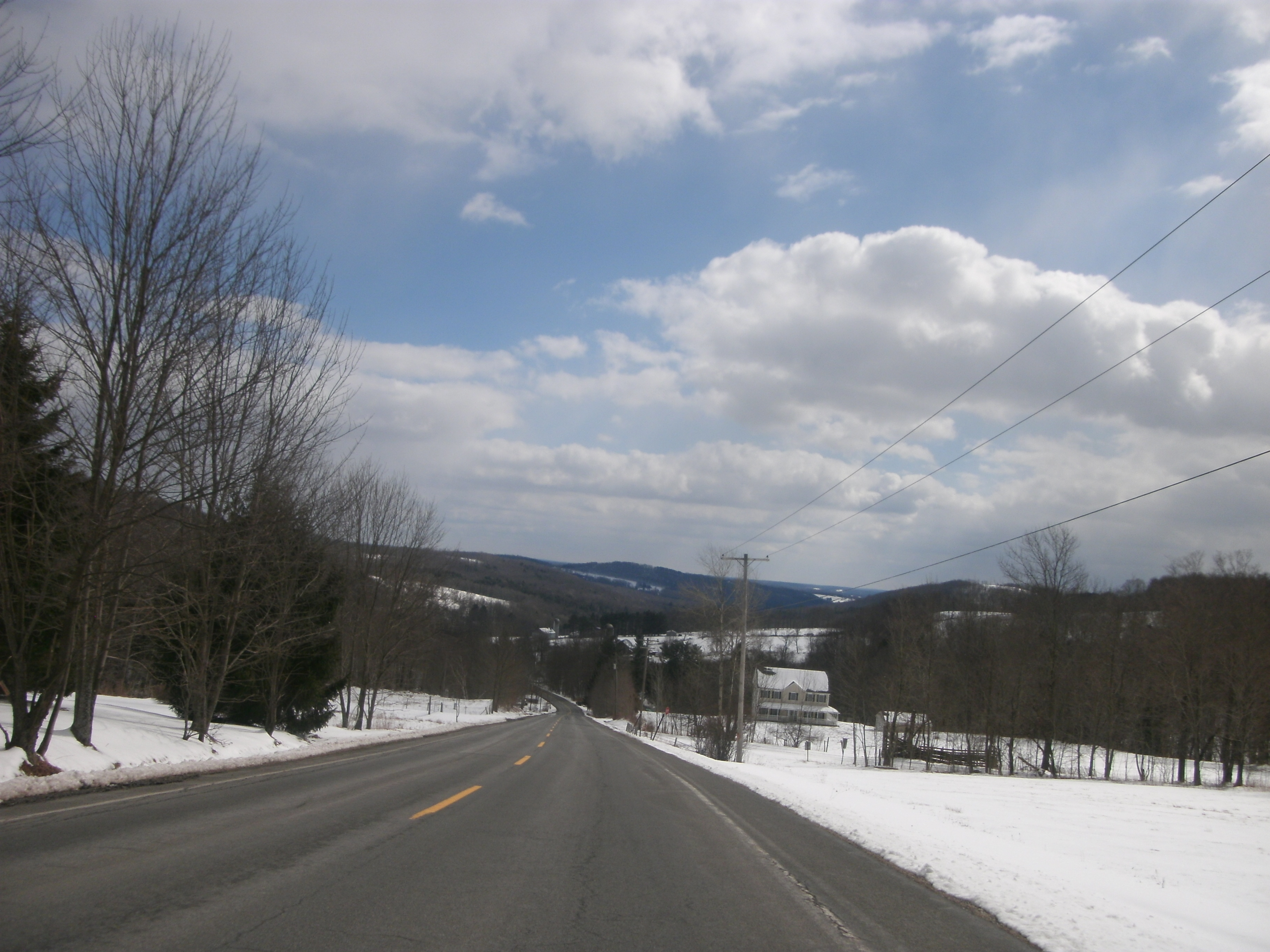
- County Route 149 as it passes through the snowy landscape of the Town of Callicoon.

- Location of Callicoon in Sullivan County, New York
- Coordinates: 41°50′11″N 74°55′00″W
- Country: United States
- State: New York
- County: Sullivan

Area
  - Total: 48.95 sq mi (126.77 km^{2})
  - Land: 48.59 sq mi (125.85 km^{2})
  - Water: 0.36 sq mi (0.92 km^{2})

Population (2020)
  - Total: 2,989
  - Density: 61.51/sq mi (23.75/km^{2})
- Demonym: Callicoonian
- FIPS code: 36-105-11759

Callicoon is a town in Sullivan County, New York, United States. The population was 2,989 at the 2020 census. The town is in the northwestern part of the county.

== History ==
The town was formed in 1842 from the Town of Liberty. The original spelling of the name was "Collikoon." This name is said to signify "turkey" in both Dutch and Choctaw. The Dutch word for turkey is kalkoen. Although the Choctaw have a word for turkey, cholokloha, the people did not occupy territory anywhere near here, but traditionally lived in the Deep South. They were known as one of the Five Civilized Tribes there before their removal to Indian Territory in the 1830s.

== Geography ==
According to the United States Census Bureau, the town has a total area of 49.0 square miles (126.9 km^{2}), of which 48.7 square miles (126.0 km^{2}) is land and 0.3 square mile (0.9 km^{2}) (0.69%) is water.

== Demographics ==
Historical population
Census	Pop.	Note	%±
1850	1,671		—
1860	3,174		89.9%
1870	2,763		−12.9%
1880	2,180		−21.1%
1890	2,083		−4.4%
1900	2,054		−1.4%
1910	2,059		0.2%
1920	1,739		−15.5%
1930	1,996		14.8%
1940	2,092		4.8%
1950	2,134		2.0%
1960	2,176		2.0%
1970	2,398		10.2%
1980	2,998		25.0%
1990	3,024		0.9%
2000	3,052		0.9%
2010	3,057		0.2%
2020	2,989		−2.2%
U.S. Decennial Census

As of the census of 2010, there were 3,057 people, 1,288 households, and 822 families residing in the town. The population density was 62.7 inhabitants per square mile (24.2/km^{2}). There were 90 housing units at an average density of 36.9 per square mile (14.2/km^{2}). The racial makeup of the town was 95.81% White, 0.75% Black or African American, 0.20% Native American, 0.69% Asian, 1.15% from other races, and 1.41% from two or more races. Hispanic or Latino of any race were 4.55% of the population.

There were 1,288 households, out of which 24.8% had children under the age of 18 living with them, 49.3% were married couples living together, 10.0% had a female householder with no husband present, and 36.2% were non-families. Of all households, 29.3% were made up of individuals, and 13.7% had someone living alone who was 65 years of age or older. The average household size was 2.30 and the average family size was 2.82.

In the town, the population was spread out, with 23.1% under the age of 18, 6.5% from 18 to 24, 25.1% from 25 to 44, 27.3% from 45 to 64, and 18.1% who were 65 years of age or older. The median age was 42 years. For every 100 females, there were 94.5 males. For every 100 females age 18 and over, there were 92.3 males.

The median income for a household in the town was $38,811, and the median income for a family was $46,645. Males had a median income of $34,524 versus $24,185 for females. The per capita income for the town was $19,272. About 6.8% of families and 10.5% of the population were below the poverty line, including 11.3% of those under age 18 and 6.1% of those age 65 or over.

== Communities and locations in Callicoon ==
- Callicoon Center: A hamlet in the northern part of the town at the junction of Routes 122 and 125. This community was originally called Thurmansville. The Hessinger Store was listed on the National Register of Historic Places in 2000.
- Jeffersonville: A village.
- North Branch: A hamlet on the north branch of the Callicoon Creek and Route 122.
- Youngsville: A hamlet in the eastern part of the town.
- Fosterdale: A town near Callicoon.
- Narrowsburg: A town near Callicoon.

Although it bears the same name, the census-designated place and hamlet of Callicoon is in the neighboring Town of Delaware, not in the town of Callicoon.
