= Basher Kill =

Stream in Orange and Sullivan County, New York, U.S.

Basher Kill Basha Kill, Baska's Kill
- The location of the mouth of Basher Kill
- Etymology: Named after Bashee, a local Native American

Location
- Country: United States
- State: New York
- Counties: Orange, Sullivan

Physical characteristics
- Source: The Basha Kill Marsh
  - location: Wurtsboro, NY
  - coordinates: 41°31′17″N 74°32′23″W
  - elevation: 540 ft (160 m)
- Mouth: Neversink River
  - location: Godeffroy, NY
  - coordinates: 41°26′58″N 74°35′35″W
  - elevation: 459 ft (140 m)

Basher Kill is a stream in Orange and Sullivan counties in the U.S. state of New York. It is a tributary to the Neversink River.

The stream headwaters are at 41°35′10″N 74°27′58″W and elevation of approximately 540 feet in Sullivan County just north of Wurtsboro and connected to the Delaware and Hudson Canal. The stream flows to the southwest paralleling U.S. Route 209 passing under New York Route 17 southeast of Wurtsboro. The stream enters Orange County at the village of Westbrookville. The stream continues to the southwest crossing under New York Route 211 to its confluence with the Neversink River at 41°26′58″N 74°35′35″W at an elevation of 459 feet. The confluence is just northeast of the community of Myers Grove.

Basher Kill was named after Bashee, a local Native American woman. Many variant spellings have been recorded, including "Ba-sha Kill", "Basha's Kill", "Basher's Kill", "Bashers Kil", Bashers Kill", and "Bashes Kil".

The stream flows through Basha Kill Wildlife Management Area, a manmade wetland maintained by the New York State Department of Environmental Conservation (NYSDEC) as a New York State Wildlife Management Area. The NYSDEC built a dam along the watercourse in the 1970s to preserve the Basha Kill and its wildlife.
