= Rattle Hill =

Mountain in New York, United States

- Location within New York Adirondack Park Location within the United States

Highest point
- Elevation: 2,585 feet (788 m)
- Coordinates: 41°58′24″N 74°46′10″W

Geography
- Location: NNW of Grooville, New York, U.S.
- Topo map: USGS Livingston Manor

Rattle Hill is a mountain in Sullivan County, New York. It is located north-northwest of Grooville. Beech Mountain is located east-northeast, Burnt Hill is located west-southwest and Gray Hill is located south-southwest of Rattle Hill.
