= Jeffersonville, New York =

- Village
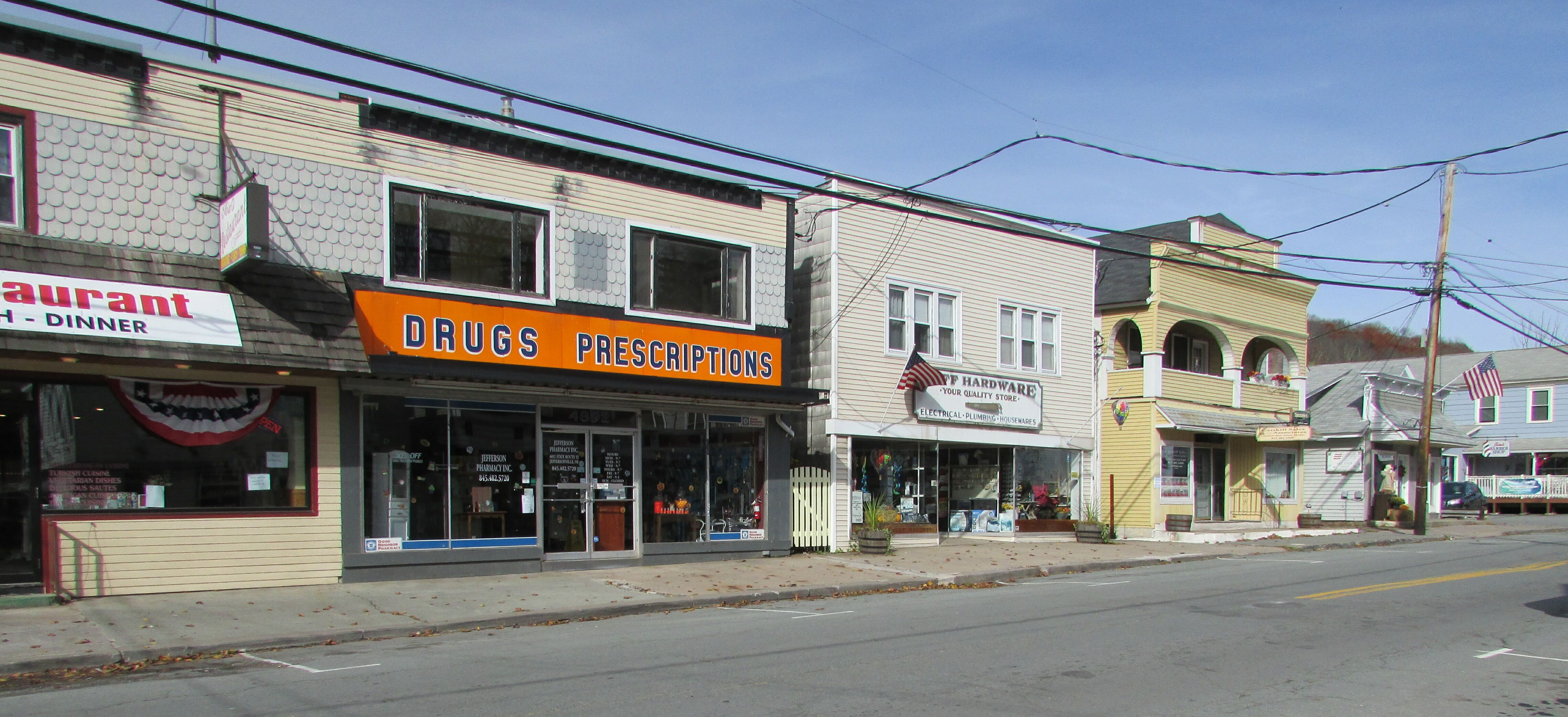
- Downtown Jeffersonville

- Location of Jeffersonville in Sullivan County, New York
- Coordinates: 41°46′50″N 74°55′56″W
- Country: United States
- State: New York
- County: Sullivan
- Settled: 1830; 196 years ago
- Incorporated: November 24, 1924; 101 years ago

Area
  - Total: 0.44 sq mi (1.14 km^{2})
  - Land: 0.41 sq mi (1.06 km^{2})
  - Water: 0.031 sq mi (0.08 km^{2})
- Elevation: 1,050 ft (320 m)

Population (2020)
  - Total: 369
  - Density: 901.2/sq mi (347.94/km^{2})
- Time zone: UTC-5 (EST)
  - Summer (DST): UTC-4 (EDT)
- ZIP code: 12748
- Area code: 845
- FIPS code: 36-38506
- GNIS feature ID: 0953977
- Website: villageofjeffersonvilleny.com

Jeffersonville is a village in Sullivan County, New York, United States. The population was 369 at the 2020 census. The name is derived indirectly from Thomas Jefferson.

The Village of Jeffersonville is in the southeastern section of the Town of Callicoon on NY 52. The postal code is 12748. The Village of Jeffersonville is home to the Sullivan West Central School elementary school.

== History ==
The original settlers arrived c. 1830 and called the village Winkelried.

The first hotel in the village was The Jefferson House, named after President Jefferson, and the village was subsequently renamed to Jeffersonville. The hotel is now known as the Abel Building and still stands on Main St.

In 1897 and 1898, a total of bills from hotels and saloons in town showed that 3000 kegs of beer were consumed in a village with a population of 500.

The village was incorporated on November 24, 1924.

In June 1974, Patty Hearst was kept in a home in Jeffersonville that was rented by Nicki Scott, a Symbionese Liberation Army ally. Patty Hearst described Jeff as "remote and as near nowhere in particular." (Times Herald Record, June 1974). During her days in captivity in Jeffersonville, it was rumored that she trained in guerrilla warfare.

The Jeffersonville School was listed on the National Register of Historic Places in 2008.

== Geography ==
Lake Jefferson is a small lake near the village.

Jeffersonville is located at 41°46′50″N 74°55′56″W (41.780417, -74.932281).

According to the United States Census Bureau, the village has a total area of 0.4 square miles (1.0 km^{2}), of which 0.4 square miles (1.0 km^{2}) is land and 0.04 square miles (0.10 km^{2}) (6.82%) is water.

== Demographics ==
Historical population
Census	Pop.	Note	%±
1880	324		—
1930	448		—
1940	403		−10.0%
1950	450		11.7%
1960	434		−3.6%
1970	421		−3.0%
1980	554		31.6%
1990	484		−12.6%
2000	420		−13.2%
2010	359		−14.5%
2020	368		2.5%
U.S. Decennial Census

As of the census of 2000, there were 420 people, 162 households, and 92 families residing in the village. The population density was 1,028.2 inhabitants per square mile (397.0/km^{2}). There were 206 housing units at an average density of 504.3 per square mile (194.7/km^{2}). The racial makeup of the village was 95.95% White, 1.43% African American, 1.67% from other races, and 0.95% from two or more races. Hispanic or Latino of any race were 2.86% of the population.

There were 162 households, out of which 25.9% had children under the age of 18 living with them, 46.9% were married couples living together, 6.2% had a female householder with no husband present, and 43.2% were non-families. 37.7% of all households were made up of individuals, and 21.6% had someone living alone who was 65 years of age or older. The average household size was 2.25 and the average family size was 3.05.

In the village, the population was spread out, with 20.7% under the age of 18, 5.5% from 18 to 24, 21.7% from 25 to 44, 23.1% from 45 to 64, and 29.0% who were 65 years of age or older. The median age was 46 years. For every 100 females, there were 78.0 males. For every 100 females age 18 and over, there were 76.2 males.

The median income for a household in the village was $32,500, and the median income for a family was $48,125. Males had a median income of $34,219 versus $22,232 for females. The per capita income for the village was $17,899. None of the families and 6.7% of the population were living below the poverty line, including no under eighteens and 5.4% of those over 64.

== Media ==
Since 1990 Jeffersonville has been home to public radio station and NPR affiliate WJFF at 90.5 FM. A translator at 94.5 serves the Monticello village.

WPDA-FM (106.1 MHz) simulcasts WPDH-FM (101.5 MHz) from Poughkeepsie, NY, and is licensed to Jeffersonville. Its transmitter, however, is located just northwest of Liberty, NY.

== Town Haul ==
In 2004, Jeffersonville was the subject of TLC Network television program Town Haul in which interior designer Genevieve Gorder, a regular designer for TLC's program Trading Spaces, undertook to make over several buildings in the town.
