= Debruce, New York =

Debruce
- Hamlet
- Location within the state of New York
- Coordinates: 41°54′49″N 74°43′38″W
- Country: United States
- State: New York
- County: Sullivan
- Time zone: UTC-5 (Eastern (EST))
  - Summer (DST): UTC-4 (EDT)
- ZIP codes: 12758
- Area code: 845

De Bruce is a small hamlet located in Sullivan County, New York, United States.

== Geography ==
De Bruce is approximately 6 miles (9.7 km) east of Livingston Manor, at the confluence of Willowemoc and Mongaup creeks. It is located at 41°55' North, 74°44' West (41.917, -74.733).

== History ==
The name, De Bruce, is derived from one of its early European investors, Elias DesBrosses, a French Huguenot who with Renssalier and others, escaped from France and persecution, living in the Netherlands. With others he invested in the New World. While he remained in Europe, his offspring became wealthy land owners and were involved in New York politics.

De Bruce was once a resort town, catering to fly fishermen. George LeBranch, author of The Dry Fly and Fast Water in 1914, who had his home in De Bruce, famously cast his first dry fly there. The De Bruce Club Inn, first owned by Charles B. Ward and then by Walter Kocher since the early 1940s, was also there. The Inn offered a nine-hole golf course, tennis courts and fishing on several miles of the choicest water on the upper Willowemoc. It had its own farm, fish hatchery, hydroelectric plant, private area telephone system, and later TV cable. Movies were shown on weekends. During its heyday in the 1930s and 1940s it was a popular destination for sportsmen from the city, famous for its food and smiling hostesses, and Chef Cesar Ricci. Chef Ricci would oversee its grand formal picnics at both Little Falls and at Mongaup Pond with tables, linens, and flatware with animals spit roasted whole.

In the early 1900s one of LeBranch's favorite dry flies was called the pink lady—pale pink floss ribbed with gold tinsel, duck wings, ginger hackle and tail on a #12 hook. Amusingly, a favorite drink at the Inn was also called the pink lady—gin, grenadine, apple brandy, lemon juice and cracked ice, strained into a stemmed glass. It was also popular with parents of children at the many area summer camps.

The main Inn was torn down in 1970 by its current owners, the Kocher family. The Auditorium (Casino) and several hotel buildings still stand, and have reopened as The Rose Cottage in De Bruce (named after Rose Kocher). The De Bruce Fly Fishing Club leases what was the Fishermans' Cottage, the hatchery and several miles of the Willowemoc. The properties are currently owned and operated as The Rose Cottage in De Bruce, a small bed & breakfast inn; the Swiss Cottage, an AirBnB; and the De Bruce Farmstead, gardens, and chicken and duck eggs by the Kocher family.

The New York State Department of Environmental Conservation has run the De Bruce Environmental Education Camp, for youth who are 12 to 14 years old in De Bruce. Situated on over 300 acres (1.2 km^{2}) of land adjoining the Catskill Forest Preserve, Camp De Bruce has been in operation since 1948. Formerly a private estate and fish hatchery, the De Bruce Camp was acquired by the DEC in the 1940s and converted into a conservation education camp for boys. In 1975, Camp De Bruce began operation as a co-educational facility. Other area camps during the hotel's heyday were Camp Acadia and Our Lady of Lourdes Camp for Girls, and Hunter Camp.

De Bruce was, in its earliest days, a site for one of the Catskills' largest tanneries, employing over 100 men shortly after it was established in 1856. This industry relied on the easy availability of water and hemlock trees, about 5% of the forests. The trees were cut down and their bark, one of the cheapest supplies of tannin available, was peeled off, leaving the timber to rot. The leather was processed in factories near the water and often actually in the forest. The industry quickly depleted the trees, peaking in about 1870, and was entirely gone from the Catskills by 1895, much to the relief of the trout fishermen, no doubt. Bald Mt. in De Bruce was so named because it was left that way by the tanneries.

In 1985, near De Bruce, on DeBruce Road to DeBruce, De Bruce Country Inn opened. It was sold and is now operated as The De Bruce. The former De Bruce Club Inn has now reopened as The Rose Cottage in De Bruce.

== Labor Day Parade ==
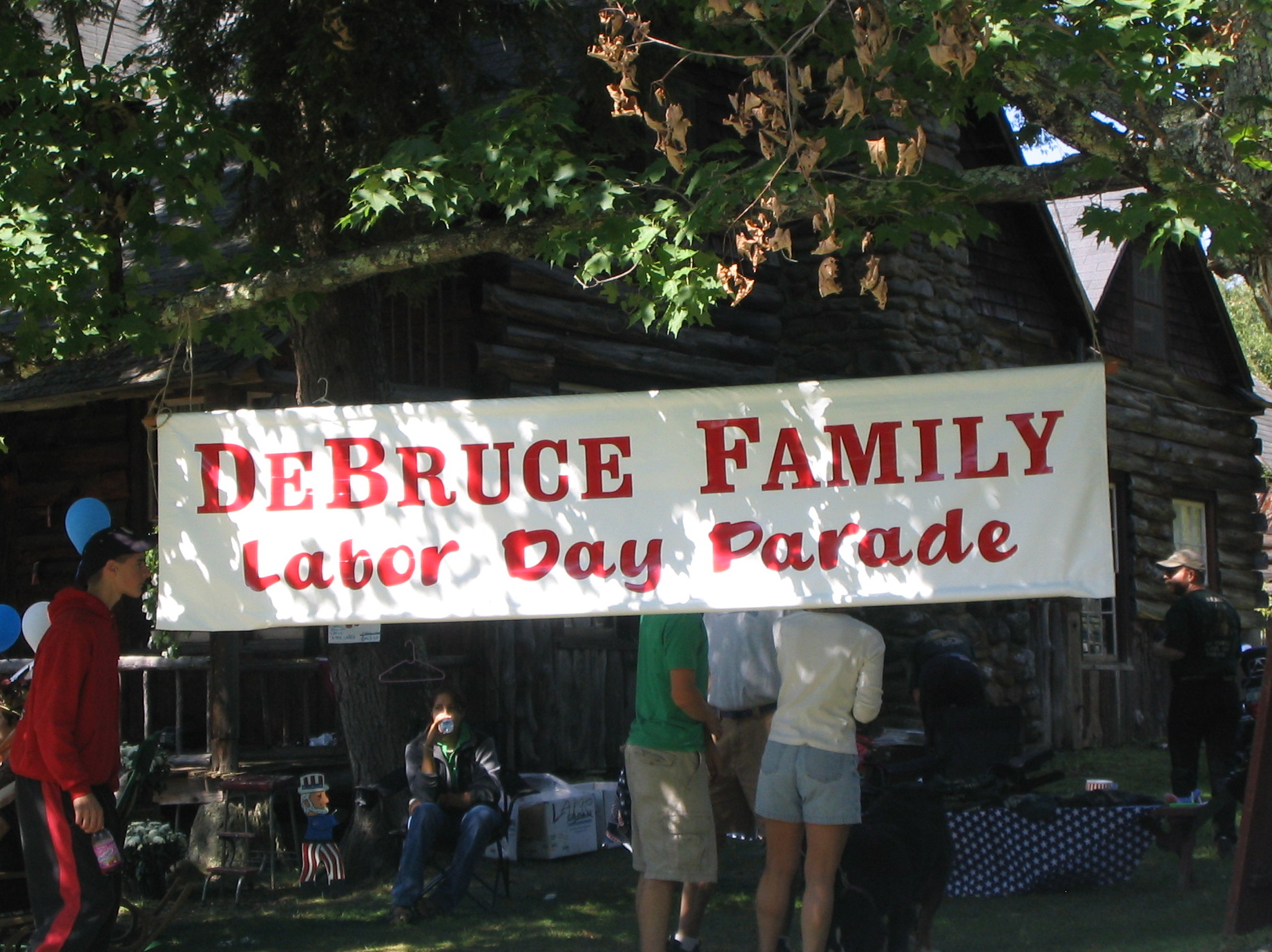
Labor Day Parade

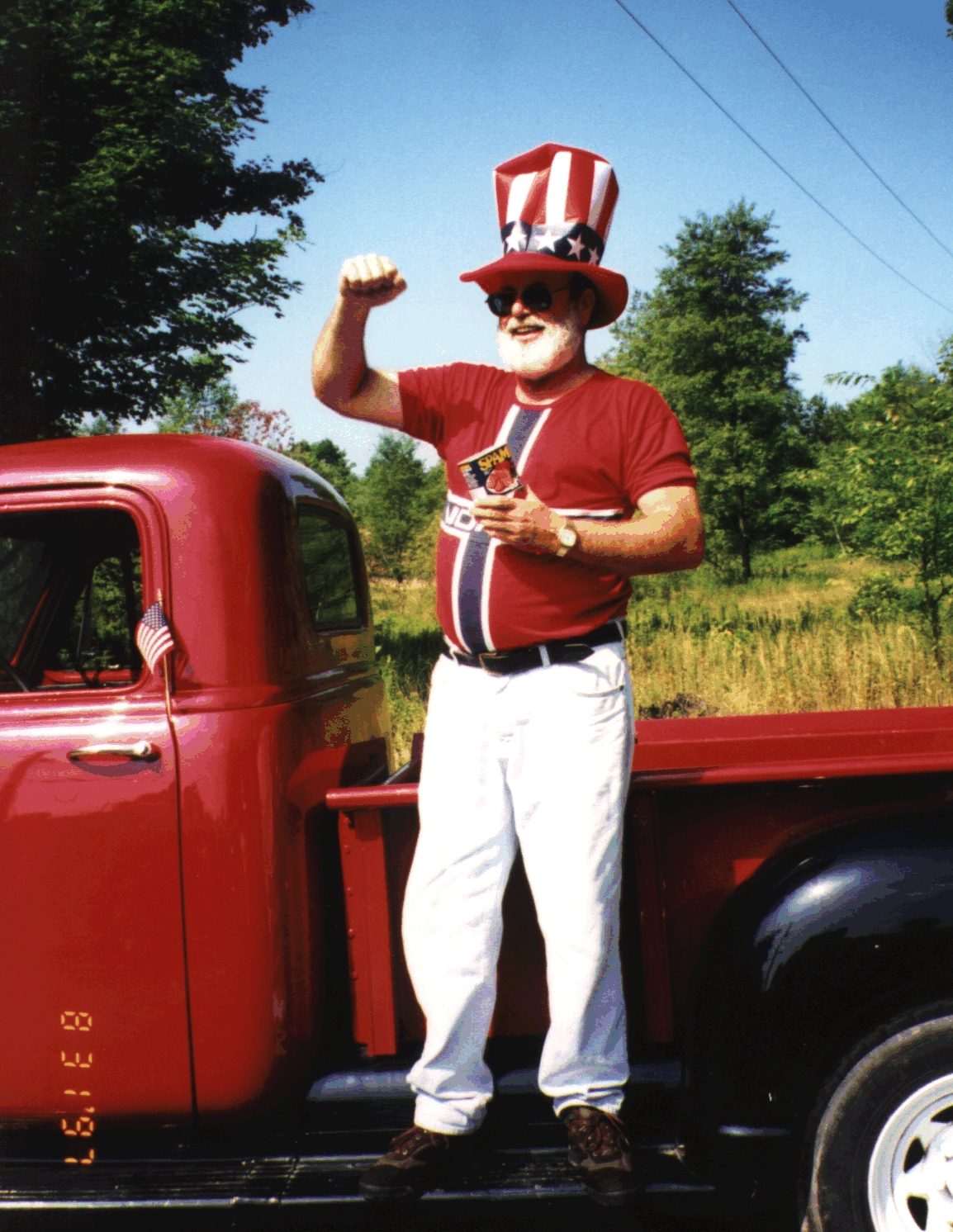
The organizer of the parade, Steve Dill

The town was known for its "De Bruce Family Labor Day Parade". Held annually since 1993, it brings the entire community (many, if not most, summer people) out to celebrate the Autumn harvest, the end of summer, or just to be together one more year. Often there is a King or Queen of the parade—Floyd Cook, the 100-year-old "Mayor of the Hill" has had this honor several times. Unfortunately, Cook died in August 2012. An unusual feature of the parade is its shortness. The course, it starts in Dill's front yard, and stretches over about one city block, which is considerably shorter than the line of marchers and vehicles in it.

After 2010, the De Bruce parade was held as a fundraiser for the Livingston Manor Free Library, which is located about 6 miles away from the parade site. The DeBruce Parade was discontinued when its organizers moved away.

== Notable people ==
- Charles B. Ward, former US Congressman
