= Wurtsboro, New York =

- Village
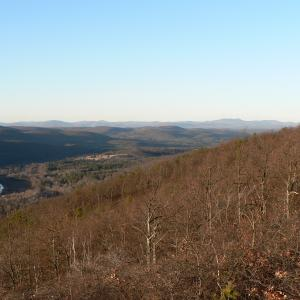

- Location of Wurtsboro in Sullivan County, New York

- Location within the state of New York
- Coordinates: 41°34′34″N 74°29′08″W
- Country: United States
- State: New York
- County: Sullivan
- Town: Mamakating

Area
  - Total: 1.25 sq mi (3.24 km^{2})
  - Land: 1.25 sq mi (3.24 km^{2})
  - Water: 0 sq mi (0.00 km^{2})
- Elevation: 564 ft (172 m)

Population (2020)
  - Total: 1,124
  - Density: 899.8/sq mi (347.41/km^{2})
- Time zone: UTC-5 (Eastern (EST))
  - Summer (DST): UTC-4 (EDT)
- ZIP code: 12790
- Area code: 845
- FIPS code: 36-83272
- GNIS feature ID: 2391227
- Website: www.villageofwurtsboro.com

Wurtsboro is a village located on U.S. Route 209 in the town of Mamakating in Sullivan County, New York, United States, near its junction with New York State Route 17 (which is being upgraded to interstate standards and will be renumbered as Interstate 86). The population was 1,124 at the 2020 census. Since 1927 the area has been served by Wurtsboro-Sullivan County Airport.

== History ==
Before Europeans, Wurtsboro was inhabited by Native Americans known as the Leni Lenape. Called Delaware by the Europeans, the Leni Lenape are known to other tribes, in their tongues, as "the old people" and are considered to be one of the oldest tribes in North America. Many anthropologists believe the Leni Lenape are the ancestors of the original people who crossed the Bering Strait to first populate North America. Within the Leni Lenape, different villages dotted the valleys between the Delaware and Hudson rivers. The group that resided in the Wurtsboro area was known as the Mamacottin.

As the Dutch settled along the Hudson and searched inland for furs and minerals, they engineered and built the oldest road in America. This roadway, little more than a cart path along the trails of the Leni Lenape, became known as the Old Mine Road. Present day US Rte. 209 follows much of the original course. It is thought that these Dutch settlers were the first to name the area Mamakating.

As other Europeans settled the area, the treaties and land grants for a great deal of the northeast were benchmarked from the Hardenburgh tract. That survey benchmark, still annotated and utilized, can be found in the village near Rte. 209.

The original name for the village of Wurtsboro was Rome. It is said that when the ‘yankees’ obtained a foothold in the hollow (Mamakating valley), they counted all the mountain peaks they could see and with an ambitious view, called the place Rome. This name was retained until as late as 1812. That same year, the area's first church was built. This Dutch Reformed church was named the "Church of Rome." Somewhat later the town was renamed Wurtsborough, which evolved to Wurtsboro.

During the early industrial revolution, much of the nation's bituminous coal needs were supplied by England. During the War of 1812, a fuel shortage arose when a British blockade cut off America's coal supply. Interest turned to anthracite coal, known then as stone coal. Anthracite was native to Pennsylvania, but lack of adequate transportation was a deterrent. Three Wurts brothers (Maurice Wurts was the most prominent), then Philadelphia dry goods store owners, capitalized on this problem by forming a company to construct a 108-mile canal from Honesdale, Pennsylvania to Kingston, New York, the Delaware and Hudson Canal. On July 13, 1825, New York City Mayor (and company investor) Philip Hone used a golden spade to turn the first shovelful of earth during the canal's groundbreaking ceremony, in the village. With the advent of the canal, products such as coal, lumber, livestock, and other staples were shipped through the area on their way to Albany and New York City. In those days, it was a practice of the D&H Canal Co. to rename communities along the canal for their favored officers. Names such as Honesdale, Port Jervis, Hawley, and Wurtsboro were so named.

As steam replaced horse power, the railroads replaced the canals. While the canal operated until its closure in 1898, the D&H Railroad was in fact a reorganization of the original canal company. In many sections, the railroad bed (now abandoned) parallels the canal. Both can be easily seen by visiting the D&H Canal Linear Park, which is a scenic walkway along the canal towpath from Wurtsboro to Summitville.

The village of Wurtsboro was originally confined to the berm of the canal. Several existing businesses were active at that time. Notable examples include Danny's, built in 1814 for the purpose of serving food and providing lodging; and the Canal Towne Emporium, better known in the canal days as Fulton & Holmes’ General Store, selling many items that were delivered by canal barge. Over time, the village gradually extended westward and merged with the old village of Mamakating. In 1830 the name of the post office was changed from Mamakating to Wurtsborough, with Lyman O’Dell (known as the village poet and essayist) acting as the first postmaster.

Another economic impact for the area in those early days was derived from the tanning industry that developed here. Hemlock bark was used to tan hides and it was in plentiful supply. In fact, over 80% of all leather goods used by the Union Army during the Civil War were processed in Sullivan county tanning vats. The industry waned as the hemlock in the area was over-forested (accounting for the scarcity today) and synthetic tannic acid was developed. In the late 1800s the Ontario & Western Railroad laid down its tracks on the eastern end of the village. Like the canal, it served to carry merchandise as well as passengers to the area. The O&W was a primary player in the tourism boom during the late 1800s into the 20th century, as it allowed thousands of New York residents to escape the heat of the city and relax in the clean Catskill mountain air. Eventually, just as the railroads replaced the canals, the interstate highway system replaced the railroads.

== Geography ==
According to the United States Census Bureau, the village has a total area of 1.3 square miles (3.4 km^{2}), all land.

The Long Path, a hiking trail, goes through Wurtsboro.

The Mamakating Park Historic District and Masten-Quinn House are listed on the National Register of Historic Places.

== Demographics ==
Historical population
Census	Pop.	Note	%±
1870	797		—
1880	538		−32.5%
1890	490		−8.9%
1900	450		−8.2%
1910	478		6.2%
1920	362		−24.3%
1930	423		16.9%
1940	487		15.1%
1950	628		29.0%
1960	655		4.3%
1970	732		11.8%
1980	1,128		54.1%
1990	1,048		−7.1%
2000	1,234		17.7%
2010	1,246		1.0%
2020	1,124		−9.8%
U.S. Decennial Census

As of the census of 2000, there were 1,234 people, four hundred seventy nine households, and 330 families residing in the village. The population density was 975.5 inhabitants per square mile (376.6/km^{2}). There were 542 housing units at an average density of 428.5 per square mile (165.4/km^{2}). The racial makeup of the village was 93.68% white, 1.86% African American, 0.81% Asian, 1.62% from other races, and 2.03% from two or more races. Hispanic of any race were 4.62% of the population.

There were 479 households, out of which 39.5% had children under the age of 18 living with them, 50.3% were married couples living together, 13.2% had a female householder with no husband present, and 31.1% were non-families. 27.3% of all households were made up of individuals, and 9.6% had someone living alone who was 65 years of age or older. The average household size was 2.58 and the average family size was 3.15.

In the village, the population was spread out, with 30.2% under the age of 18, 6.8% from 18 to 24, 30.1% from 25 to 44, 22.5% from 45 to 64, and 10.3% who were 65 years of age or older. The median age was 35 years. For every 100 females, there were 92.5 males. For every 100 females age 18 and over, there were 88.4 males.

The median income for a household in the village was $38,500, and the median income for a family was $46,359. Males had a median income of $40,385 versus $25,060 for females. The per capita income for the village was $16,698. About 9.7% of families and 10.9% of the population were below the poverty line, including 11.5% of those under age 18 and 1.5% of those age 65 or over.
