= Sullivan County, New York =

County in New York, United States

- County
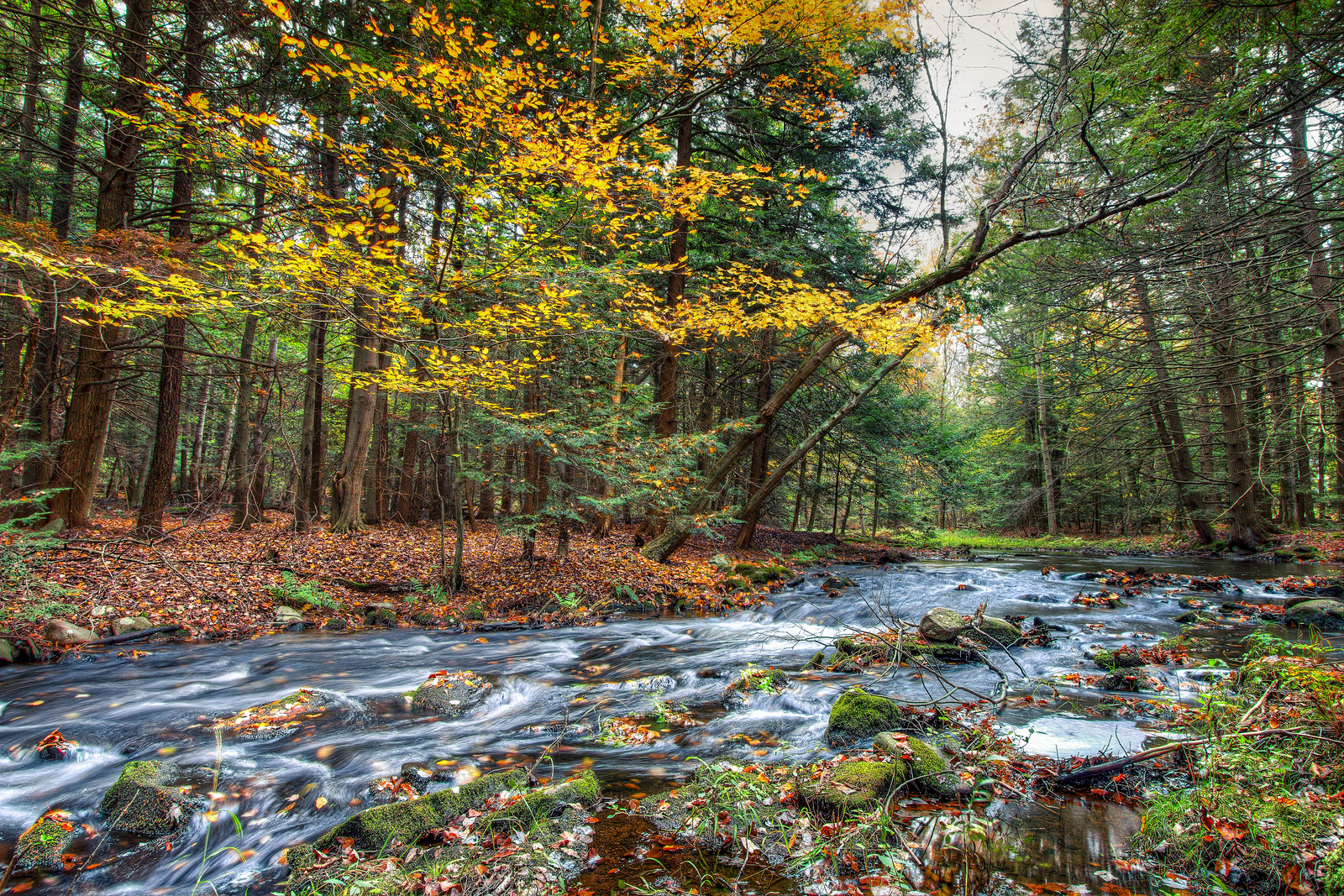
- Stream in the hamlet of Rock Hill

- Flag Seal

- Location within the U.S. state of New York
- Coordinates: 41.72°N 74.76°W
- Country: United States
- State: New York
- Founded: 1809
- Named for: John Sullivan
- Seat: Monticello
- Largest village: Monticello

Area
  - Total: 997 sq mi (2,580 km^{2})
  - Land: 968 sq mi (2,510 km^{2})
  - Water: 29 sq mi (75 km^{2}) 2.9%

Population (2020)
  - Total: 78,624
  - Estimate (2025): 80,586 ▲
  - Density: 83.2/sq mi (32.1/km^{2})
- Time zone: UTC−5 (Eastern)
  - Summer (DST): UTC−4 (EDT)
- Congressional district: 19th
- Website: www.sullivanny.gov

Sullivan County is a county in the U.S. state of New York. As of the 2020 census, the population was 78,624. The county seat is Monticello. The county's name honors Major General John Sullivan, who was labeled at the time as a hero in the American Revolutionary War in part due to his successful campaign in destroying 40 Haudenosaunee villages and chasing 5,000 of them out of the area (see Sullivan Expedition). The county is part of the Hudson Valley region of the state.

The county was the site of hundreds of Borscht Belt hotels and resorts, which had their heyday from the 1920s through the 1970s.

In 2010, the state's center of population was at the southern edge of Sullivan County.

== History ==
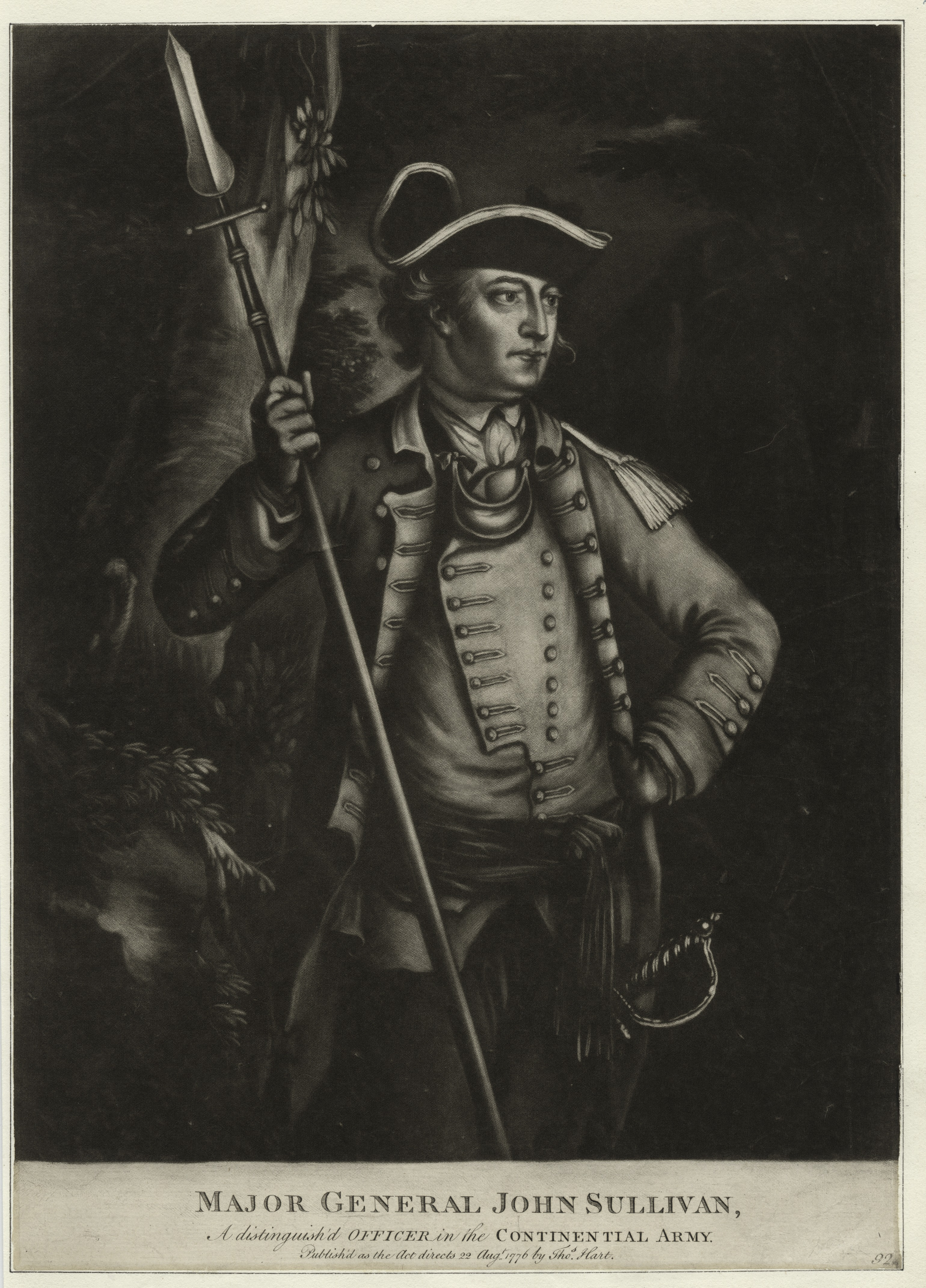
John Sullivan, general in the Continental Army, delegate in the Continental Congress, Governor of New Hampshire, and namesake of Sullivan County

When the Province of New York established its first twelve counties in 1683, the present Sullivan County was part of Ulster County. In 1809, Sullivan County was split from Ulster County.

== Geography ==
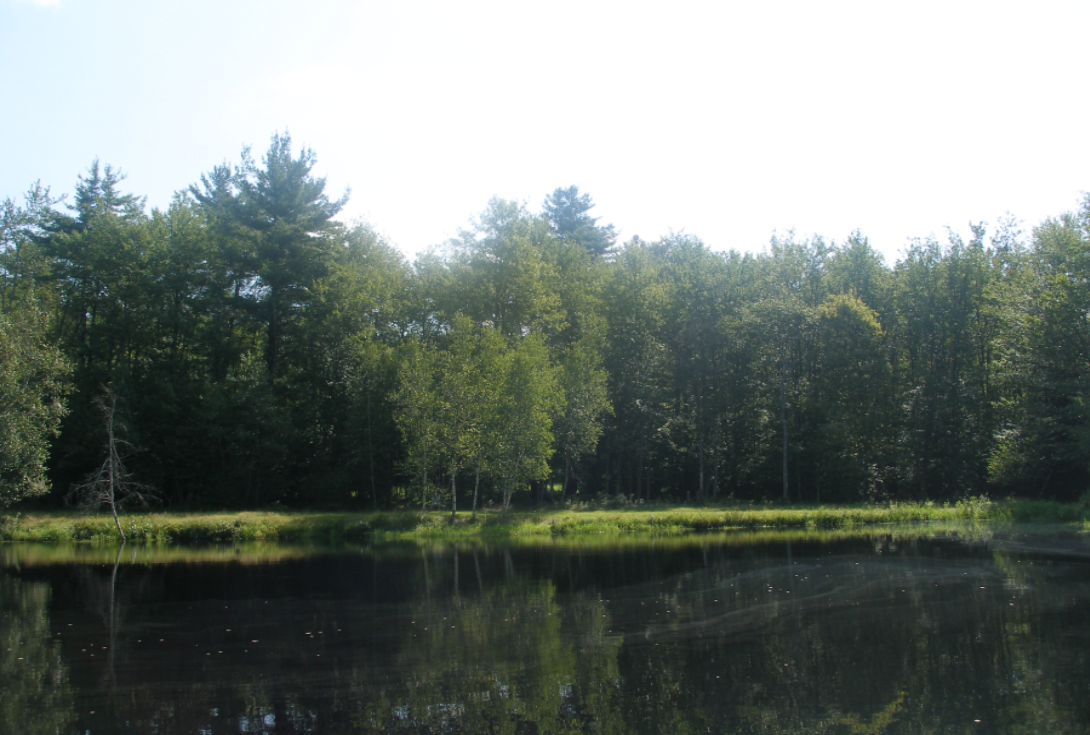
Swan Lake

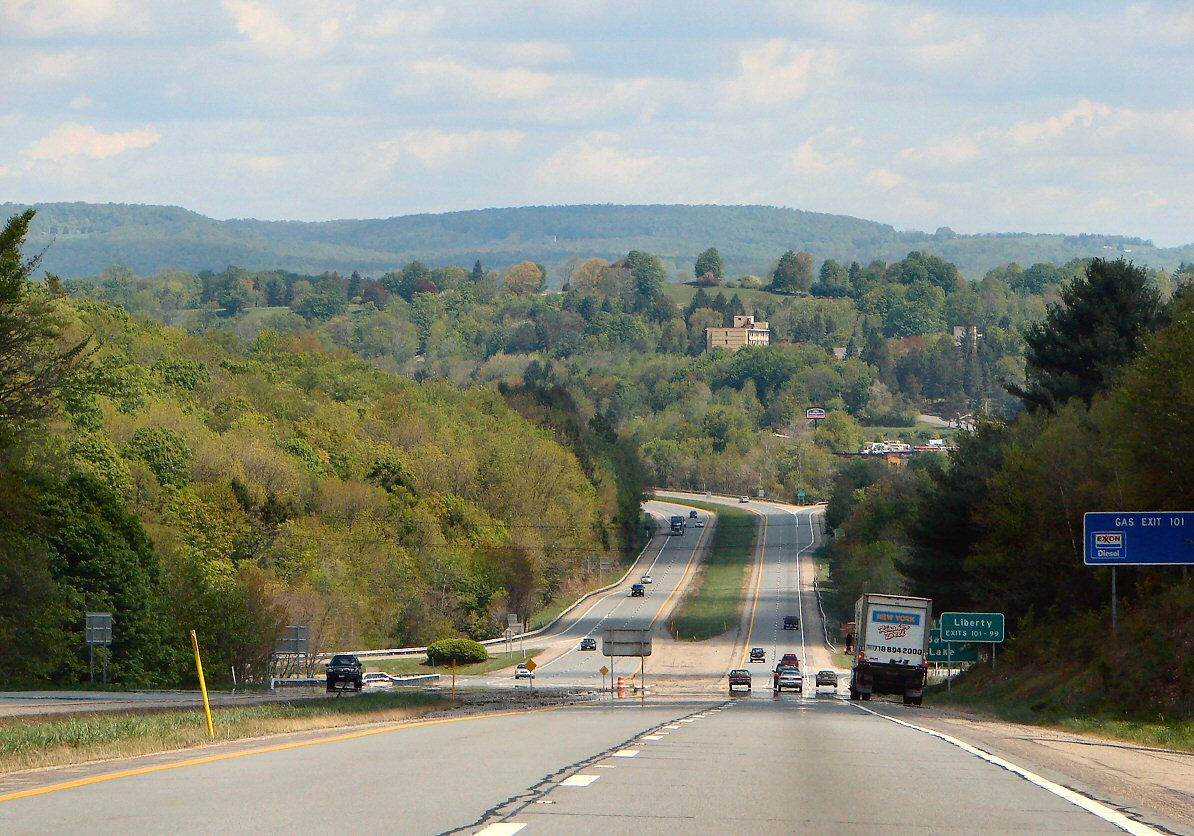
New York State Route 17 (Future Interstate 86) in Liberty

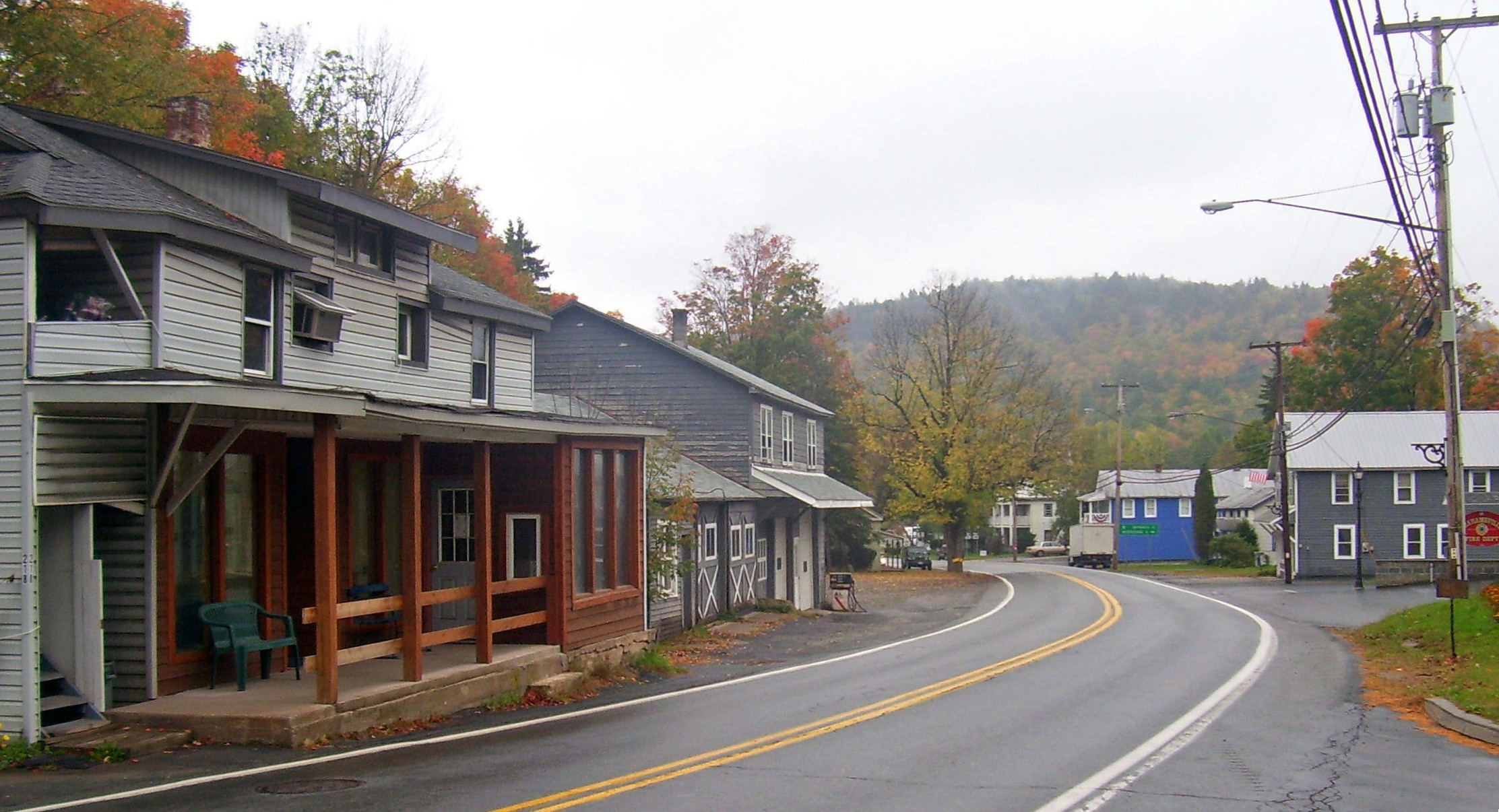
Hamlet of Grahamsville

According to the U.S. Census Bureau, the county has a total area of 997 square miles (2,580 km^{2}), of which 968 square miles (2,510 km^{2}) is land and 29 square miles (75 km^{2}) (2.9%) is water.

Sullivan County is in the southern part of New York State, southeast of Binghamton and southwest of Albany. It is separated from Pennsylvania along its southwest boundary by the Delaware River.

The county, which starts about 70 miles northwest of New York City, is in the Catskill Mountains. Its northeastern corner is within the Catskill Park.

The highest point in the county is a 3,118-foot (950 m) peak referred to as Beech Mountain. The lowest point is along the Delaware River.

=== Adjacent counties ===
- Delaware County - north
- Ulster County - northeast
- Orange County - southeast
- Pike County, Pennsylvania - southwest
- Wayne County, Pennsylvania - west

== Demographics ==
Historical population
Census	Pop.	Note	%±
1810	6,108		—
1820	8,900		45.7%
1830	12,364		38.9%
1840	15,629		26.4%
1850	25,088		60.5%
1860	32,385		29.1%
1870	34,550		6.7%
1880	32,491		−6.0%
1890	31,031		−4.5%
1900	32,306		4.1%
1910	33,808		4.6%
1920	33,163		−1.9%
1930	35,272		6.4%
1940	37,901		7.5%
1950	40,731		7.5%
1960	45,272		11.1%
1970	52,580		16.1%
1980	65,155		23.9%
1990	69,277		6.3%
2000	73,966		6.8%
2010	77,547		4.8%
2020	78,624		1.4%
2025 (est.)	80,586	▲	2.5%

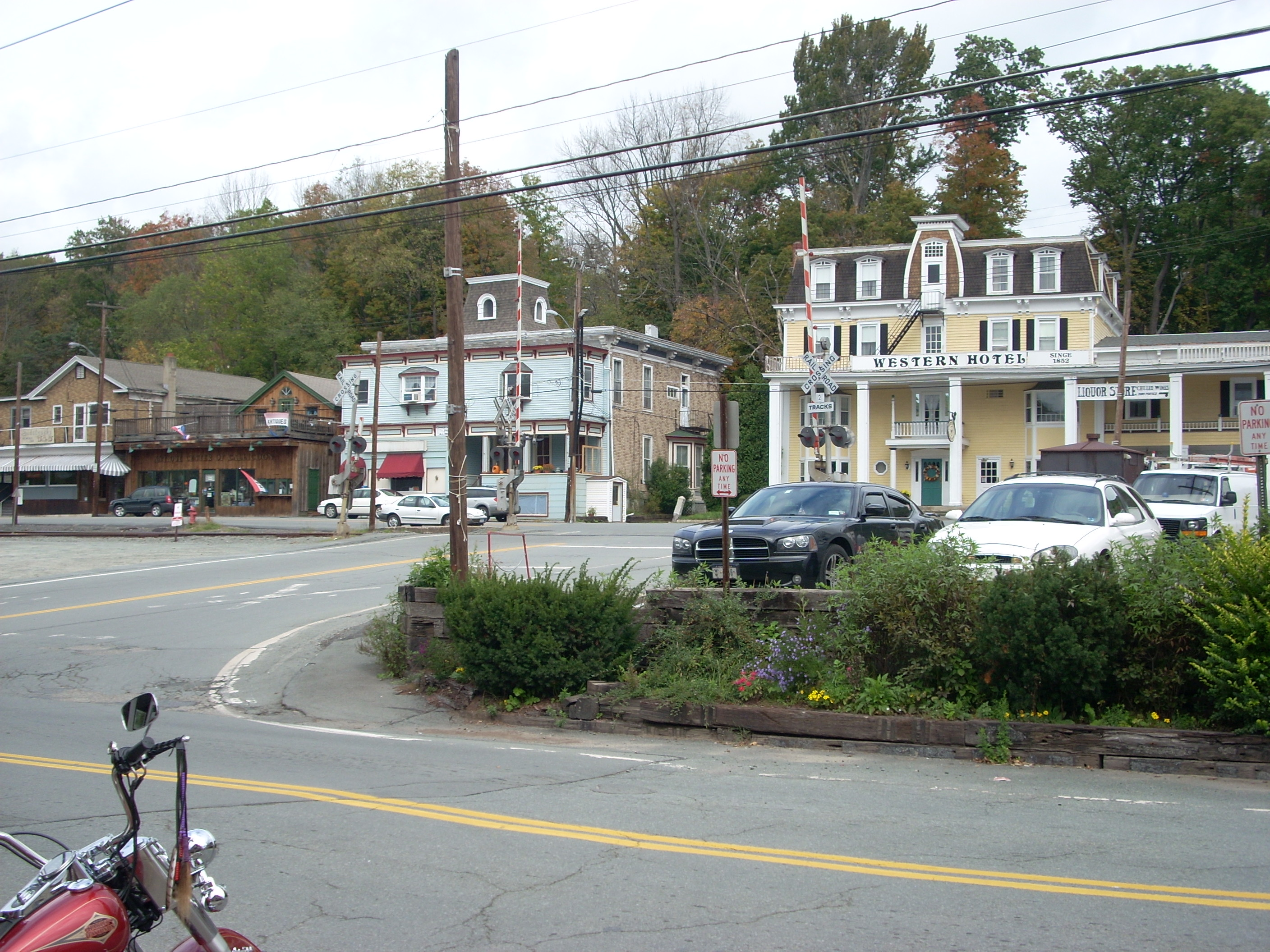
Hamlet of Callicoon

=== 2020 census ===
Sullivan County, New York – Racial and ethnic composition Note: the US Census treats Hispanic/Latino as an ethnic category. This table excludes Latinos from the racial categories and assigns them to a separate category. Hispanics/Latinos may be of any race.
Race / Ethnicity (NH = Non-Hispanic)	Pop 1980	Pop 1990	Pop 2000	Pop 2010	Pop 2020	% 1980	% 1990	% 2000	% 2010	% 2020
White alone (NH)	57,531	58,243	59,225	57,780	52,691	88.30%	84.07%	80.07%	74.51%	67.02%
Black or African American alone (NH)	4,310	5,572	5,897	6,349	6,069	6.61%	8.04%	7.97%	8.19%	7.72%
Native American or Alaska Native alone (NH)	122	119	166	228	174	0.19%	0.17%	0.22%	0.29%	0.22%
Asian alone (NH)	383	525	810	1,033	1,569	0.59%	0.76%	1.10%	1.33%	2.00%
Native Hawaiian or Pacific Islander alone (NH)	x	x	10	14	10	x	x	0.01%	0.02%	0.01%
Other race alone (NH)	153	71	156	189	602	0.23%	0.10%	0.21%	0.24%	0.77%
Mixed race or Multiracial (NH)	x	x	863	1,400	3,502	x	x	1.17%	1.81%	4.45%
Hispanic or Latino (any race)	2,656	4,747	6,839	10,554	14,007	4.08%	6.85%	9.25%	13.61%	17.82%
Total	65,155	69,277	73,966	77,547	78,624	100.00%	100.00%	100.00%	100.00%	100.00%

=== 2000 census ===
As of the 2000 census, there were 73,966 people, 27,661 households, and 18,311 families residing in the county. The population density was 76 people per square mile (29 people/km^{2}). There were 44,730 housing units at an average density of 46 per square mile (18/km^{2}). The racial makeup of the county was 85.31% White, 8.51% Black or African American, 0.27% Native American, 1.12% Asian, 0.04% Pacific Islander, 2.89% from other races, and 1.87% from two or more races. 9.25% of the population were Hispanic or Latino of any race. 16.6% were of German, 13.9% Irish, 12.5% Italian, 7.3% American and 6.2% English ancestry according to 2000 census. 86.6% spoke English, 7.4% Spanish and 1.0% German as their first language. A small population of Russians, late twentieth-century immigrants, live in the villages. There are a few persons in Sullivan and nearby counties who are of mixed Dutch and Mohawk or Lenni-Lenape ancestry in this region of upstate New York, the legacy of indigenous peoples in the region and the New Netherlands colonial era in the 17th century.

There were 27,661 households, out of which 31.30% had children under the age of 18 living with them, 50.10% were married couples living together, 11.40% had a female householder with no husband present, and 33.80% were non-families. 27.90% of all households were made up of individuals, and 11.40% had someone living alone who was 65 years of age or older. The average household size was 2.50 and the average family size was 3.05.

In the county, the population was spread out, with 24.90% under the age of 18, 7.30% from 18 to 24, 28.10% from 25 to 44, 25.40% from 45 to 64, and 14.30% who were 65 years of age or older. The median age was 39 years. For every 100 females, there were 103.60 males. For every 100 females age 18 and over, there were 102.80 males.

The median income for a household in the county was $36,998, and the median income for a family was $43,458. Males had a median income of $36,110 versus $25,754 for females. The per capita income for the county was $18,892. About 11.60% of families and 17.40% of the population were below the poverty line, including 21.60% of those under age 18 and 10.70% of those age 65 or over.

=== National protected area ===
- Upper Delaware Scenic and Recreational River (part)

== Government and politics ==
Sullivan County is a swing county, backing the national winner in all but three presidential elections from 1952 to the present. In 2004, Republican George W. Bush defeated Democrat John Kerry by a margin of 49.47% to 48.55%, or a difference of 285 votes. In 2008, however, it was won by Democrat Barack Obama over Republican John McCain by a margin of 54% to 45%. The margin remained virtually the same in 2012, as Obama won the county again over Republican Mitt Romney by 54-45%. But then, in 2016, the county swung to Republican Donald Trump over Democrat Hillary Clinton by a margin of 53% to 42%. In 2020, the county didn't back the winner nationally for the first time since 2000. Incumbent Republican President Donald Trump won the county with 54% of the votes that year compared to the national winner Democrat Joe Biden's 45%.

There are thirty-six town and village courts in Sullivan County.

Legislative authority is vested in the county legislature which consists of nine members, each elected from single member districts. Currently, there are five Democrats and four Republicans.

Sullivan County Legislature
District	Legislator	Title	Party
1	Matt McPhillips	Majority Leader	Democratic
2	Nadia Rajsz	Chair	Democratic
3	Brian McPhillips		Democratic
4	Nicholas Salomone Jr.	Minority Leader	Republican
5	Catherine Scott		Democratic
6	Luis Alvarez		Democratic
7	Joseph Perrello		Republican
8	Amanda Ward		Republican
9	Terry Blosser-Bernardo		Republican

United States presidential election results for Sullivan County, New York
Year	Republican		Democratic		Third party(ies)	
Year	No.	%	No.	%	No.	%
1884	3,332	45.31%	3,607	49.05%	415	5.64%
1888	3,860	49.66%	3,757	48.33%	156	2.01%
1892	3,664	48.28%	3,567	47.00%	358	4.72%
1896	4,589	58.35%	3,073	39.08%	202	2.57%
1900	4,393	53.92%	3,625	44.49%	130	1.60%
1904	4,452	54.37%	3,582	43.74%	155	1.89%
1908	4,593	52.52%	3,911	44.72%	242	2.77%
1912	3,039	37.56%	3,864	47.75%	1,189	14.69%
1916	4,340	53.05%	3,659	44.73%	182	2.22%
1920	8,029	64.45%	3,623	29.08%	806	6.47%
1924	7,734	56.85%	4,057	29.82%	1,813	13.33%
1928	10,331	61.27%	6,207	36.81%	323	1.92%
1932	8,294	44.79%	9,656	52.15%	567	3.06%
1936	9,757	48.83%	9,908	49.58%	317	1.59%
1940	11,877	54.64%	9,785	45.01%	76	0.35%
1944	11,258	55.82%	8,836	43.81%	73	0.36%
1948	11,253	53.20%	7,654	36.19%	2,245	10.61%
1952	14,926	63.26%	8,421	35.69%	247	1.05%
1956	15,845	63.94%	8,937	36.06%	0	0.00%
1960	13,744	54.37%	11,486	45.44%	49	0.19%
1964	8,006	32.31%	16,728	67.52%	41	0.17%
1968	11,657	48.17%	10,860	44.88%	1,681	6.95%
1972	17,035	63.24%	9,847	36.55%	56	0.21%
1976	13,709	48.79%	14,189	50.50%	198	0.70%
1980	15,089	55.44%	9,553	35.10%	2,576	9.46%
1984	18,037	63.09%	10,475	36.64%	78	0.27%
1988	15,713	57.00%	11,635	42.20%	220	0.80%
1992	11,396	36.02%	13,717	43.36%	6,522	20.62%
1996	9,321	33.00%	15,052	53.29%	3,871	13.71%
2000	12,703	44.53%	14,348	50.29%	1,477	5.18%
2004	15,319	49.47%	15,034	48.55%	613	1.98%
2008	13,900	44.58%	16,850	54.04%	433	1.39%
2012	12,705	44.71%	15,268	53.73%	442	1.56%
2016	15,931	53.18%	12,568	41.96%	1,456	4.86%
2020	18,665	53.87%	15,489	44.71%	492	1.42%
2024	20,386	58.14%	14,549	41.50%	127	0.36%

== Education ==
=== Public school districts ===
- Eldred Central Schools
- Fallsburg Central Schools
- Liberty Central School District
- Livingston Manor Central School District
- Monticello Central Schools
- Roscoe Central Schools
- Sullivan West Central School
- Tri-Valley Central School

=== Higher education ===
- SUNY Sullivan

== Transportation ==
Sullivan County has services provided by Short Line to New York City. It also has some local service provided by the county itself, as well as community organizations.

Sullivan County International Airport is located in Bethel and is used frequently for general aviation purposes.

=== Major roadways ===
- US 209
- NY 17
- NY 17B
- NY 42
- NY 52
- NY 52A
- NY 55
- NY 55A
- NY 97
- NY 206

== Tourism ==
Sullivan County has several popular tourist spots, with the majority of the tourism occurring in the summer months.

Borscht Belt hotels, bungalow colonies, summer camps, and kuchaleyns (a Yiddish name for self-catered boarding houses) proliferated. The bungalows usually included "a kitchen/living room/dinette, one bedroom, and a screened porch" with entertainment being simple: bingo or a movie. The kuchaleyns were also visited often by middle and working-class Jewish New Yorkers. Because of the many Jewish guests, this area was nicknamed the Jewish Alps and "Solomon County" (a modification of Sullivan County) by many people who visited there.

Many famous comedians tested their material and performed regularly at Borscht Belt hotels, including Milton Berle, Mel Brooks, and Henny Youngman. Eddie Fisher performed often at Grossinger's, where in 1955 he married Debbie Reynolds.

By the late 1950s, many began closing with most gone by the 1970s, but some major resorts continued to operate, a few into the 1990s. Grossinger's Catskill Resort Hotel closed in 1986 and the Concord Resort Hotel struggled to stay open until 1998. By that time, the business owed millions in back taxes to Sullivan County, but the property was sold "for $10.5 million" and a new resort was eventually built.

Sullivan County was the site of the 1969 Woodstock Festival located at the present-day Bethel Woods Center for the Arts. During the period August 15–18, 1969, approximately 500,000 people gathered in Sullivan County's Town of Bethel at Max Yasgur's farm to attend the Woodstock Festival. The entertainers included The Who; the Grateful Dead; Jefferson Airplane; The Band; Canned Heat; Joan Baez; Arlo Guthrie; Crosby, Stills, Nash and Young; Janis Joplin; Santana; Sly and the Family Stone; Blood, Sweat and Tears; Jimi Hendrix; and Richie Havens. The state and the town of Bethel council subsequently passed laws prohibiting future mass event types of festivals. In 2019, a 50th celebration of Woodstock was organized: "Sullivan County ... finally embracing the ultimate symbol of peace and love, the 1969 Woodstock festival". The Woodstock 50 festival, scheduled for August, was canceled months earlier so it did not take place. The Bethel Woods Center for the Arts did organize of weekend of "low-key" concerts.

Bethel Woods Center for the Arts, which also includes a museum of the sixties and Woodstock, holds many concerts and other events throughout the year.

Other notable cultural destinations include the CAS Arts Center, a multi-arts exhibit space and education center run by the Catskill Art Society in Livingston Manor, New York, the NaCl Theatre, a professional regional theater company focusing on experimental work in Highland Lake, and the Delaware Valley Arts Alliance (DVAA) which serves as the Arts Council for Sullivan County and is located in Narrowsburg. DVAA offers two art galleries, performing arts and cultural programming, grant opportunities for artists and nonprofits, the Big Eddy Film Festival, and Riverfest.

== Communities ==
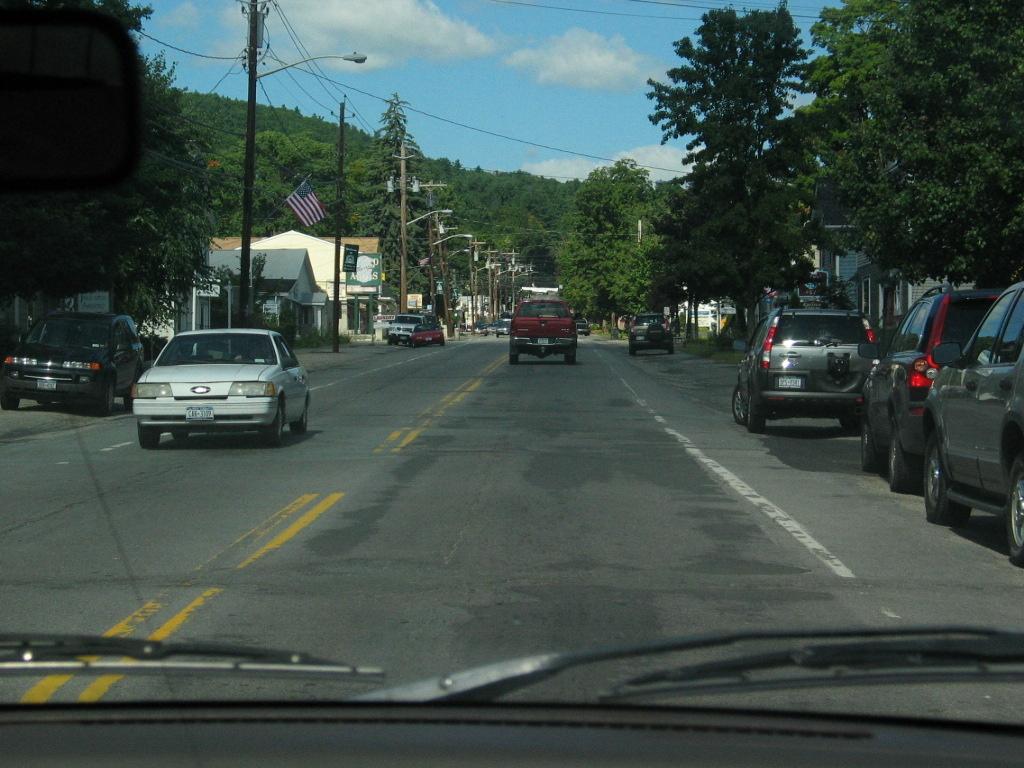
Village of Wurtsboro

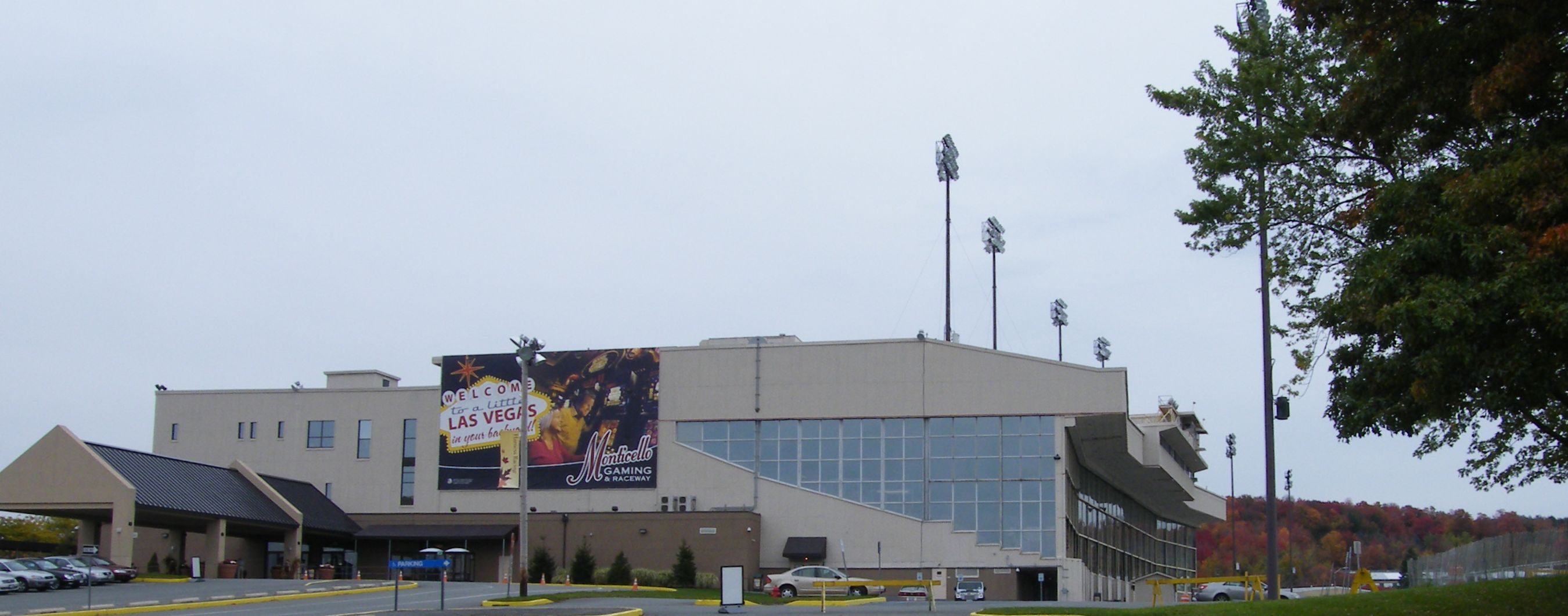
Monticello Raceway in Monticello

=== Towns ===
- Bethel
- Callicoon
- Cochecton
- Delaware
- Fallsburg
- Forestburgh
- Fremont
- Highland
- Liberty
- Lumberland
- Mamakating
- Neversink
- Rockland
- Thompson
- Tusten

=== Villages ===
- Ateres
- Bloomingburg
- Jeffersonville
- Liberty
- Monticello (county seat)
- Woodridge
- Wurtsboro

=== Census-designated places ===
- Barryville
- Bridgeville
- Callicoon
- Eldred
- Fallsburg
- Grahamsville
- Hankins
- Hortonville
- Hurleyville
- Kauneonga Lake
- Kiamesha Lake
- Lake Huntington
- Livingston Manor
- Loch Sheldrake
- Mongaup Valley
- Mountain Dale
- Narrowsburg
- Rock Hill
- Roscoe
- Smallwood
- South Fallsburg
- Swan Lake
- White Lake
- Woodbourne
- Wurtsboro Hills

=== Hamlets ===
- Burlingham
- Debruce
- Ferndale
- Glen Spey
- Handsome Eddy
- Harris
- Haven
- Hazel
- Lew Beach
- Long Eddy
- Minisink Ford
- North Branch
- Spring Glen
- Summitville
- White Sulphur Springs
- Yulan
- Youngsville

== Notable people ==
- Danz CM, American musician, record producer, magazine founder-from Woodridge
- Gavin Degraw, American musician-from Fallsburg
- Jake Lang (born 1995–96) American far-right activist and domestic terrorist
- Jeff McBride (born 1959), American magician and magic instructor

== See also ==
- Upstate New York
- Hudson Valley
- Catskill Mountains
- List of counties in New York
- National Register of Historic Places listings in Sullivan County, New York
- Borscht Belt
- Woodstock Festival
