= Roaring Brook =

Roaring Brook may refer to:

== Streams ==
- Roaring Brook (Cruser Brook tributary), New Jersey, US
- Roaring Brook (Peakville, Beaver Kill tributary), New York, US
- Roaring Brook (Black River tributary), New York, US
- Roaring Brook (Roscoe, Beaver Kill tributary), New York, US
- Roaring Brook (Treadwell Creek tributary), New York, US
- Roaring Brook (East Kill tributary), New York, US
- Roaring Brook (Hunlock Creek tributary), Pennsylvania, US
- Roaring Brook (Lackawanna River tributary), Pennsylvania, US

== Other places ==
- Roaring Brook Falls, a waterfall in Cheshire, Connecticut, US
- Roaring Brook sites, two archaeological sites in East Haddam, Connecticut, US
- Roaring Brook Township, Pennsylvania, US

== Other uses ==
- Roaring Brook Press, an American imprint of Macmillan Publishers
