= Stadel =

Stadel may refer to:

== Places ==
- Stadel bei Herrieden, a village in Ansbach, Bavaria, Germany
- Stadel bei Niederglatt, a municipality of the canton of Zürich, Switzerland
- Stadel (Winterthur), a quarter of Winterthur, Switzerland
- Stadel Mountain, a mountain of Delaware County, New York, United States

== People with the surname ==
- George Stadel (1881–1952), American tennis player
- Willi Stadel (1912–1999), German gymnast

== See also ==
- Hohlenstein-Stadel, a cave of Baden-Württemberg, Germany
- Städel Museum, an art museum in Frankfurt
