= Horse Brook =

Horse Brook may refer to:

- Horse Brook (Beaver Kill tributary), in New York
- Horse Brook (Queens), a buried stream in New York City
- Horse Brook (Trout Brook tributary), in New York
