= Horton Brook =

Location
- Country: United States
- State: New York

Physical characteristics
- Source
  - location: Delaware County, New York
- Mouth: Beaver Kill
  - location: Horton, New York, Delaware County, New York, United States
  - coordinates: 41°58′21″N 75°01′03″W
- Basin size: 8.29 mi^{2} (21.5 km^{2})

Basin features
- Tributaries
  - left: Little Fuller Brook, Dry Brook

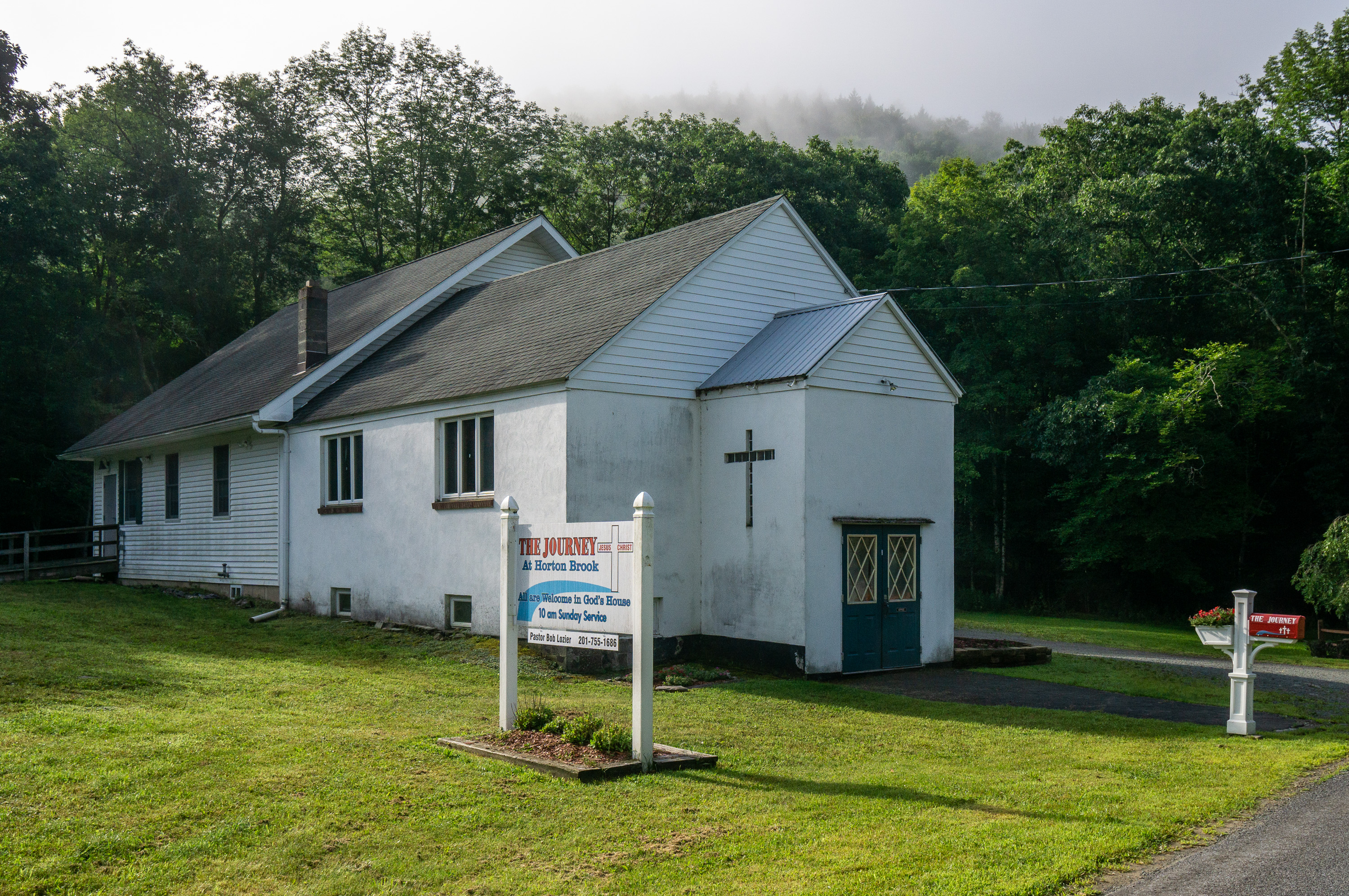
The Journey at Horton Brook is a small church along Horton Brook in Roscoe, New York

Horton Brook flows into Beaver Kill by Horton, New York.
