= Little Fuller Brook =

- Location of the mouth of Little Fuller Brook

Location
- Country: United States
- State: New York
- County: Delaware

Physical characteristics
- Source
  - coordinates: 42°00′58″N 74°57′45″W
- Mouth: Horton Brook
  - coordinates: 42°00′12″N 75°00′10″W
  - elevation: 1,512 ft (461 m)

Little Fuller Brook is a river in Delaware County, New York. It flows through Edwards Pond before converging with Horton Brook north-northeast of Horton.
