= Berry Brook (Beaver Kill tributary) =

River in the United States of America

Location
- Country: United States
- State: New York

Physical characteristics
- Source
  - location: Delaware County, New York
- Mouth: Beaver Kill
  - location: Beaverkill, New York, Sullivan, New York, United States
  - coordinates: 41°58′50″N 74°51′09″W
- Basin size: 6.41 mi^{2} (16.6 km^{2})

Berry Brook flows into Beaver Kill by Beaverkill, New York.
