= Edwards Pond =

Edwards Pond may refer to the following bodies of water in the United States:

- Edwards Pond (New York)
- Edwards Pond at Edwards Run, West Virginia
