= Crystal Brook =

Crystal Brook may refer to several places:

== Australia ==
- Crystal Brook (creek), in South Australia
- Crystal Brook, Queensland, a locality in the Whitsunday Region
- Crystal Brook, South Australia, a town north of Adelaide
- Crystalbrook, Queensland, a locality in Shire of Mareeba

== United States ==
- Crystal Brook (Beaver Kill tributary), Delaware County, New York
- Crystal Brook (East Brook tributary), Delaware County, New York
