= Congregation Agudas Achim (Livingston Manor, New York) =

Reform synagogue in New York, US

Agudas Achim Synagogue
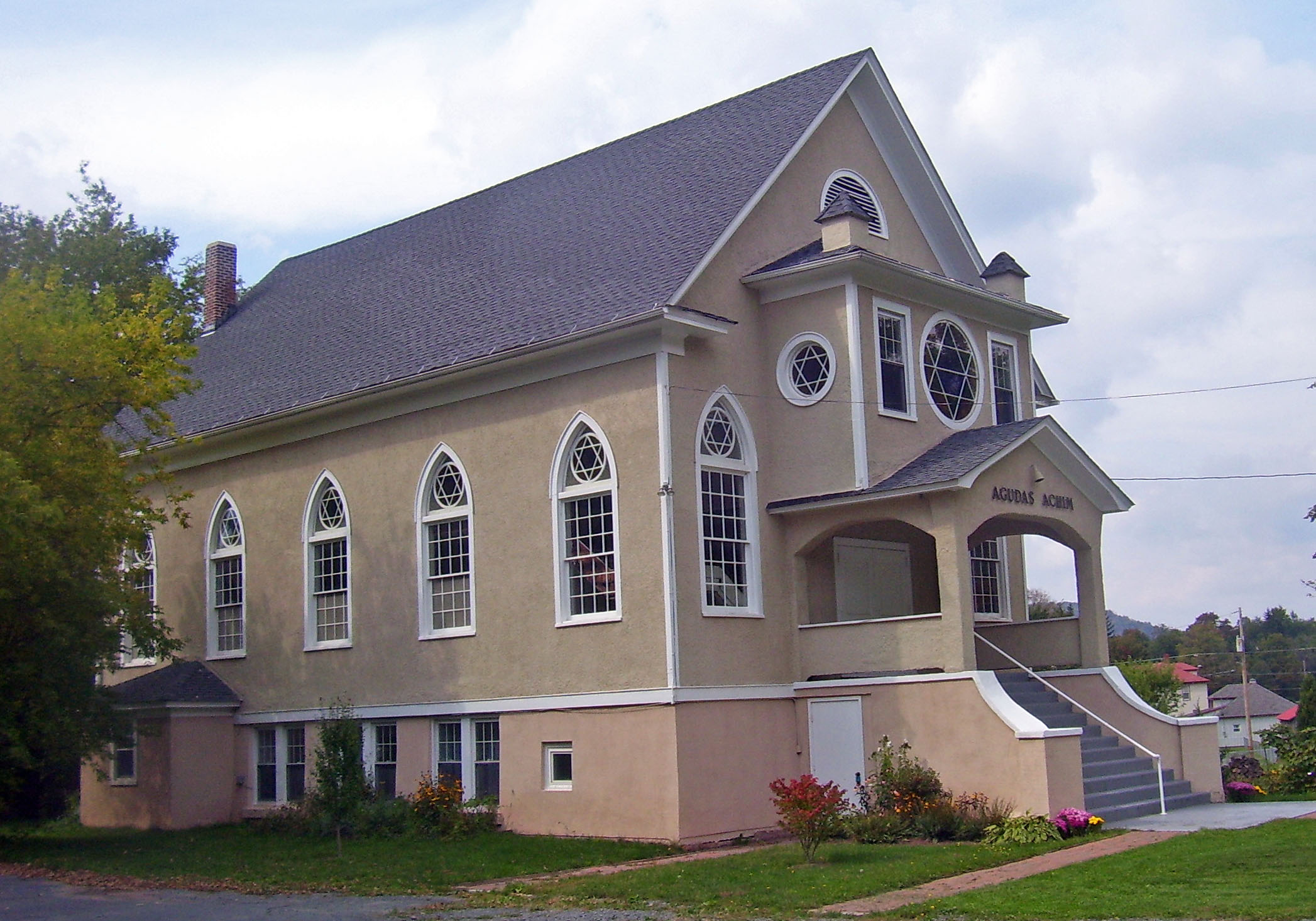
- Synagogue south profile and east elevation, 2008

- Location in New York

Religion
- Affiliation: Reform Judaism
- Ecclesiastical or organizational status: Synagogue
- Leadership: Rabbi Fred Pomerantz
- Status: Active

Location
- Location: Rock Avenue, Livingston Manor, Sullivan County, New York 12758
- Country: United States
- Interactive map of Agudas Achim Synagogue
- Coordinates: 41°54′3″N 74°49′28″W

Architecture
- General contractor: Izzy Brooks
- Established: 1913 (as a congregation)
- Completed: 1924

Specifications
- Direction of façade: East
- Materials: Concrete, stucco, wood

Website
- congregationagudasachim.org
- Agudas Achim Synagogue
- U.S. National Register of Historic Places
- NRHP reference No.: 98001404
- Added to NRHP: November 19, 1998

Agudas Achim Synagogue, formally known as Congregation Agudas Achim (transliterated from Hebrew as "Gathering of brothers"), is a Reform Jewish synagogue located on Rock Avenue in Livingston Manor, New York, United States. The stucco-sided wooden building was erected in the 1920s to serve the growing Jewish community in that area of the Catskills. It served the large summer population of Jews from the New York City area who vacationed at family resorts in the region.

The congregation was founded in 1913 as an unofficially Orthodox group that consisted of a diverse group of local Jews, not all of whom were Orthodox. The synagogue was built two years later. It combines features of Eastern European synagogues, reflecting the national origin of its founding Ashkenazi Jews, with some elements of historic Protestant Christian churches found in the area. Some features were also adapted from other contemporary synagogues in Sullivan County.

After a period of decline in the decades after World War II, following the demise of the local resort industry in the Catskills as people went further for vacations, Agudas Achim officially became a Reform congregation to attract new members. It holds services year-round. The building remains architecturally intact from the period of its construction. In 1998 it was listed on the National Register of Historic Places.

The synagogue is located a few blocks from downtown Livingston Manor on the west side of Rock Avenue, the former route of state highway NY 17. The neighborhood is a mix of residential and commercial uses.

== Architecture ==
The synagogue building reflects the dual influence of the Eastern European background of its founders and the existing local Protestant Christian churches. It shares some features common to the other synagogues built in Sullivan County at that time. On the exterior, the former influence is strongest in the dual turrets on the facade, scaled-down versions of a common motif of the synagogues of Eastern Europe. The projecting gallery below them and colored glass in the exterior also reflect those building traditions.

Agudas Achim's steep gabled roof and arched windows are both unusual features on synagogues, reflecting the meetinghouse tradition of the older Baptist and Presbyterian churches in the Catskills. The raised sanctuary with wide front steps leading to the entrance is seen on many other synagogues in the county.

Inside, the dual influences are strongly in evidence. The synagogue's layout, with the bimah in the center, reflects what was contemporary Orthodox Jewish practice in Eastern Europe. Reading the Torah and prayer were activities involving the entire congregation. In Reform services, such as those held by the synagogue since the late 20th century, an officiant leads these parts of the service. The austere interior and barrel-vaulted ceiling are evocative of a rural Protestant church, a strong contrast to the lavishly decorated interiors found at Ohave Shalom in Woodridge and the Hebrew Congregation of Mountaindale. Only the Stars of David and colored glass indicate that it is a synagogue. It is not known, however, if this spareness was adopted from the influence of the local Protestant traditions or simply due to a lack of funds for such decorative touches.

The building follows local custom in being oriented perpendicular to the road. This is different from Orthodox tradition, in which the ark is always placed at the rear of the building and toward Jerusalem. At Agudas Achim, the ark is located on the opposite side of the building. To conform to tradition, the entrance would have had to be built at what is the rear of the building, away from the road.

=== Exterior ===
The building is a one-story frame building on a raised, parged, and scored concrete basement, separated from the first floor by a wooden water table. It is sided in rough stucco with small bits of inlaid glass. The gabled roof is shingled in asphalt.

On the east (front) facade is a two-story central projecting entrance pavilion with steep concrete steps leading up to a porch with gabled roof and "AGUDAS ACHIM" in large letters in its entablature. It is topped by an enclosed ell with hipped roof, pierced by short square turrets with pyramidal roofs on either side. In its facade is a large circular window with a Star of David, flanked by two smaller sash windows. On either side are smaller circular windows with Stars of David. Above it is a semi-circular louvered vent in the gable field.

The front pavilion is echoed on the west (rear) with a smaller one holding the Torah ark and decorated with three Star-of-David windows directly above it. A brick chimney pierces the roof above on the south side of the crest. Both side profiles feature five double-hung sash windows with lancet arched transoms with colored glass Stars of David in the tracery surrounded by opaque glass.

The basement is lit by sash windows in a different pattern. There is a small projecting entrance to it on the southwest corner. On the southeast corner is a datestone.

=== Interior ===
From the porch, paneled, glazed double doors lead into a small vestibule, which opens into a single large sanctuary. It is minimally decorated, with off-white plaster walls rising to a barrel-vaulted ceiling. The sanctuary is laid out following Eastern European traditions, with the bimah in the center and pews on three sides. The ark is behind the bimah on the rear wall.

An open women's gallery, reached by two small stairs from the vestibule, extends over the rear of the sanctuary. It is serpentine in shape and supported by two round wooden columns. The gallery's outside wall is faced in rectangular panels with small square blocks in each corner; the inside wall is beaded. A raised platform at the rear is built over the vestibule.

All floors are hardwood. The bimah and ark have paneled exteriors and beaded interiors. Stairs have square posts and turned balusters. Pews are simple, supported by gently curved solid end panels. Light is provided by a centrally located iron chandelier, supplemented by four hanging lanterns, wall sconces and decorative fixtures on the bimah and ark platform.

The finished basement is used as a vestry. It has a pressed metal ceiling and central partition. One end has a small elevated stage.

== History ==
Agudas Achim straddles the entire era of Jews in the Catskills. Founded by a religious and ethnically diverse community, it became Orthodox by default, although not all its members were. Along with the Sullivan County resort industry, it went into a slow decline after World War II when other vacation opportunities opened up to the region's primarily Jewish clientele. A change to a formal affiliation with Reform Judaism has reversed the decline of both the building and its congregation. New residents in the area often have second or retirement homes there.

=== 1882–1972: Rise and decline ===
Jewish settlement in the Livingston Manor area began in 1882 when what was then known as the New York and Oswego Midland Railroad built a depot there. Local farmers could ship their produce to New York City. Some German Jews who had emigrated to the United States found their way to the Catskills and developed dairy farms. The railroad provided access to the region for city residents who wanted to get away from the summer heat, leading some farmers and residents to get into the resort and summer camp business. Many resort facilities discriminated against Jews, refusing them as guests.

In 1900, with the arrival of a new wave of Jews from Eastern Europe, new resorts were developed that catered specifically to Jewish guests. The first Jewish family settled in Livingston Manor in 1906; the first Jewish resort opened two years later. In those early years antisemitism was overt, with local residents regularly referring to the Jews as "kikes". The first recorded action of the Jewish community in the hamlet was in 1912, when several families banded together to buy land for a cemetery. Local Christian graveyards would not accept Jews.

By the 1920s, Jews made up 10% of the local population and played a larger role in local public life, lessening the hostility. Local members of The Workmen's Circle (known at the time by its Yiddish name, the Arbeiterring) started a school for Jewish children. It had four classes and was used to host social events and some religious services. Jewish identity was often expressed primarily through cultural events.

Beginning in that decade, newer Jewish arrivals in Livingston Manor were as committed to Judaism as a faith as well as a culture. These immigrants began holding High Holy Days services at a rented pavilion on the shores of Willowemoc Creek, now the site of Livingston Manor High School. In 1922, the more religious Jews gained the upper hand in the community following the departure of some of the Arbeittering members, and incorporated the congregation of Agudas Achim. They bought land and Izzy Brooks, one of the few practicing Orthodox Jews in town, built the synagogue. It was opened two years later in 1924.

More secular Jews also supported the synagogue, and eventually the school founded by the Arbeiterring closed down. The synagogue observed traditional rites and came to be considered Orthodox although it was never formally affiliated with any broader Orthodox Jewish group. Farmers and hotel owners in the congregation, many of whom lived a long distance from the town, would often drive in for Shabbat services, park a discreet distance from the synagogue and walk from there to services to maintain the appearance of following Jewish law against driving (considered work).

The Jews of Livingston Manor and their synagogue prospered during the Depression due to a summer influx of middle-class garment workers from the city. Newly unionized, the workers could afford summer vacations at Jewish mountain resorts. Among the Rabbis who served the congregation during this time were Rabbi Meir Bilitsky, ordained at Yeshiva Chaim Berlin, who began his rabbinical career in this synagogue, later moving to New Hyde Park, where he served as rabbi for the rest of his life. This increasing affluence turned against the Catskills in the 1950s. These same Jews and their descendants moved into suburban homes and began to vacation elsewhere, including those resorts that had once been closed to them. Jews began to leave the village, and by 1972 Agudas Achim was open only during the High Holy Days and beginning to deteriorate.

=== 1973–present: Reform and rebirth ===
As the congregation had dwindled to 35 members, its board began to explore formally becoming a Conservative or Reform synagogue. In 1981 it began hiring Reform rabbis, including women, to conduct services. Several years later, newer members joined with some of the older ones to form a revitalization committee. In 1984, after several older members had retired to Florida, the congregation formally became Reform. The congregation president at the time, Leon Siegel, invested Ladies' Aid Society funds from the 1960s to create an endowment that helped pay for repair and maintenance of the building.

In 1990 the synagogue hired a regular rabbi and began holding services once a month. Two years later it celebrated its first bar mitzvah since 1971. By 1999 the congregation had grown to 105 families, possibly its largest membership ever.

It now holds monthly services year-round, even though some of Livingston Manor's Jews spend the winter in Florida. It also operates a Hebrew school. In 2008 five of its students celebrated their bar or bat mitzvahs, a large number for a small congregation. It is a member synagogue of the Union for Reform Judaism.

== See also ==
- National Register of Historic Places listings in Sullivan County, New York
