= Spooner Brook =

Location
- Country: United States
- State: New York

Physical characteristics
- Source
  - location: Delaware County, New York
- Mouth: Beaver Kill
  - location: Horton, New York, Delaware County, New York, United States
  - coordinates: 41°58′15″N 75°01′21″W
- Basin size: 2.05 mi^{2} (5.3 km^{2})

Spooner Brook is a river that flows into Beaver Kill by Horton, New York.
