= Butternut Grove, New York =

- Hamlet
- Location within the state of New York
- Coordinates: 41°57′26″N 74°59′26″W
- Country: United States
- State: New York
- County: Delaware
- Town: Colchester
- Elevation: 1,165 ft (355 m)
- Time zone: UTC-5 (Eastern (EST))
  - Summer (DST): UTC-4 (EDT)

Butternut Grove is a hamlet in Delaware County, New York, United States. It is located east-southeast of East Branch on the north shore of Beaver Kill.
