= Russell Brook =

Location
- Country: United States
- State: New York

Physical characteristics
- Source
  - location: Delaware County, New York
- Mouth: Beaver Kill
  - location: Butternut Grove, New York, Delaware County, New York, United States
  - coordinates: 41°57′27″N 74°59′38″W
- Basin size: 9.53 mi^{2} (24.7 km^{2})

Russell Brook flows into Beaver Kill by Butternut Grove, New York.
