= Lake Mimi =

Lake in New York, United States

- Location of Lake Mimi within New York
- Location: Delaware County, New York
- Coordinates: 41°59′21″N 74°55′37″W
- Primary outflows: Horse Brook
- Basin countries: United States
- Surface area: 2 acres (0.81 ha)
- Surface elevation: 2,087 ft (636 m)
- Settlements: Roscoe

Lake Mimi is a small lake north-northwest of Roscoe in Delaware County, New York. It drains south via Horse Brook which flows into Beaver Kill.

== See also ==
- List of lakes in New York
