= Edwards Pond (New York) =

Lake in Delaware County, New York, United States

- Location of Edwards Pond within New York
- Location: Delaware County, New York
- Coordinates: 42°00′20″N 74°59′25″W
- Primary inflows: Little Fuller Brook
- Primary outflows: Little Fuller Brook
- Basin countries: United States
- Surface area: 5 acres (0.0078 mi^{2}; 2.0 ha)
- Surface elevation: 1,768 feet (539 m)
- Settlements: Horton

Edwards Pond is a small lake north-northeast of Horton in Delaware County, New York. Little Fuller Brook enters the lake from the northeast. It then drains west via Little Fuller Brook which flows into Horton Brook.

== See also ==
- List of lakes in New York
