= Cook Brook =

Location
- Country: United States
- State: New York

Physical characteristics
- Source
  - location: Sullivan County, New York
- Mouth: Beaver Kill
  - location: Cooks Falls, New York, Delaware County, New York, United States
  - coordinates: 41°56′47″N 74°58′42″W
- Basin size: 4.51 mi^{2} (11.7 km^{2})

Cook Brook flows into Beaver Kill by Cooks Falls, New York.
