= Dry Brook (Horton Brook tributary) =

- Location of the mouth of Dry Brook

Location
- Country: United States
- State: New York
- County: Delaware

Physical characteristics
- Source
  - coordinates: 41°59′31″N 74°59′11″W
- Mouth: Horton Brook
  - coordinates: 41°59′08″N 75°00′29″W
  - elevation: 1,293 ft (394 m)

Dry Brook is a river in Delaware County, New York. It flows into Horton Brook north-northeast of Horton.
