= Black Brook (Beaver Kill tributary) =

Location
- Country: United States
- State: New York

Physical characteristics
- Source
  - location: Ulster County, New York
- Mouth: Beaver Kill
  - location: Turnwood, New York, Ulster County, New York, United States
  - coordinates: 42°00′42″N 74°36′13″W
- Basin size: 1.41 mi^{2} (3.7 km^{2})

Black Brook flows into Beaver Kill east of Turnwood, New York.
