= Trout Brook (Beaver Kill tributary) =

Location
- Country: United States
- State: New York

Physical characteristics
- Source
  - location: Delaware County, New York
- Mouth: Beaver Kill
  - location: Peakville, New York, Delaware County, New York, United States
  - coordinates: 41°58′46″N 75°05′55″W
- Basin size: 19.9 mi^{2} (52 km^{2})

Basin features
- Tributaries
  - left: Dry Brook, Ragged Brook, Horse Brook
  - right: Ash Clove Brook

Trout Brook is a river in Delaware County, New York. It flows into Beaver Kill by Peakville.
