= Dry Brook (Trout Brook tributary) =

- Location of the mouth of Dry Brook

Location
- Country: United States
- State: New York
- County: Delaware

Physical characteristics
- Source
  - coordinates: 41°56′10″N 75°05′18″W
- Mouth: unnamed creek
  - coordinates: 41°56′52″N 75°04′25″W
  - elevation: 1,368 ft (417 m)

Dry Brook is a river in Delaware County, New York. It drains into an unnamed creek which flows into Trout Brook southeast of Peakville.
