= Shin Creek =

Location
- Country: United States
- State: New York

Physical characteristics
- Source
  - location: Ulster County, New York
- Mouth: Beaver Kill
  - location: Lew Beach, New York, Sullivan County, New York, United States
  - coordinates: 42°00′20″N 74°47′11″W
- Basin size: 6.98 mi^{2} (18.1 km^{2})

Shin Creek flows into Beaver Kill by Lew Beach, New York.
