= Mary Smith Brook =

- Location of the mouth of Mary Smith Brook

Location
- Country: United States
- State: New York
- County: Delaware

Physical characteristics
- Source
  - coordinates: 42°02′15″N 74°48′18″W
- Mouth: Beaver Kill
  - coordinates: 42°00′20″N 74°47′17″W
  - elevation: 1,578 ft (481 m)

Mary Smith Brook is a river in Delaware County, New York. It flows into Beaver Kill northwest of Lewbeach.
