= Alder Creek (Beaver Kill tributary) =

Location
- Country: United States
- State: New York

Physical characteristics
- Source
  - location: Ulster County, New York
- Mouth: Beaver Kill
  - location: Turnwood, New York, Ulster County, New York, United States
  - coordinates: 42°01′46″N 74°42′23.5″W
- Basin size: 6.16 mi^{2} (16.0 km^{2})

Alder Creek flows into Beaver Kill by Turnwood, New York. Alder Creek, like many small streams in the Catskills, helps maintain the cold, clear water needed for the trout fishery in the Beaver Kill.
