= Spring Brook (Beaver Kill tributary) =

- Location of the mouth of Spring Brook

Location
- Country: United States
- State: New York
- County: Delaware

Physical characteristics
- Source
  - coordinates: 42°01′53″N 74°54′31″W
- Mouth: Beaver Kill
  - coordinates: 41°57′55″N 74°54′23″W
  - elevation: 1,322 ft (403 m)

Basin features
- Tributaries
  - left: Little Spring Brook

Spring Brook is a river in Delaware County, New York. It flows into Beaver Kill north-northeast of Roscoe.
