= Rockland Mill Complex =

- U.S. National Register of Historic Places
- U.S. Historic district
- Location within New York Location within the United States
- Location: Palen Pl., Rockland, New York
- Coordinates: 41°56′56″N 74°54′52″W
- Area: 18 acres (7.3 ha)
- Built: 1850
- NRHP reference No.: 84003062
- Added to NRHP: August 23, 1984

Rockland Mill Complex is a national historic district located at Rockland in Sullivan County, New York. The district includes four contributing buildings and three contributing structures. They include the grist mill (ca. 1850) containing much of its original machinery; remains of the original power canal, mill pond, and tailrace with stone retaining walls; tenant house (ca. 1850); proprietor's house (1867); and ice house (1867–1900).

It was listed on the National Register of Historic Places in 1984.
