= Little Spring Brook =

- Location of the mouth of Little Spring Brook

Location
- Country: United States
- State: New York
- County: Delaware

Physical characteristics
- Source
  - coordinates: 42°01′56″N 74°52′40″W
- Mouth: Spring Brook
  - coordinates: 42°01′04″N 74°53′23″W
  - elevation: 1,736 ft (529 m)

Little Spring Brook is a river in Delaware County, New York. It flows into Spring Brook north-northeast of Roscoe.
