= Upper Beech Hill Brook =

- Location of the mouth of Upper Beech Hill Brook

Location
- Country: United States
- State: New York
- County: Delaware

Physical characteristics
- Source
  - coordinates: 42°03′10″N 74°46′47″W
- Mouth: Beaver Kill
  - coordinates: 42°01′02″N 74°46′03″W
  - elevation: 1,640 ft (500 m)

Upper Beech Hill Brook is a river in Delaware County, New York. It flows into Beaver Kill northeast of Lewbeach.
