= Livingston Manor, New York =

- CDP and hamlet
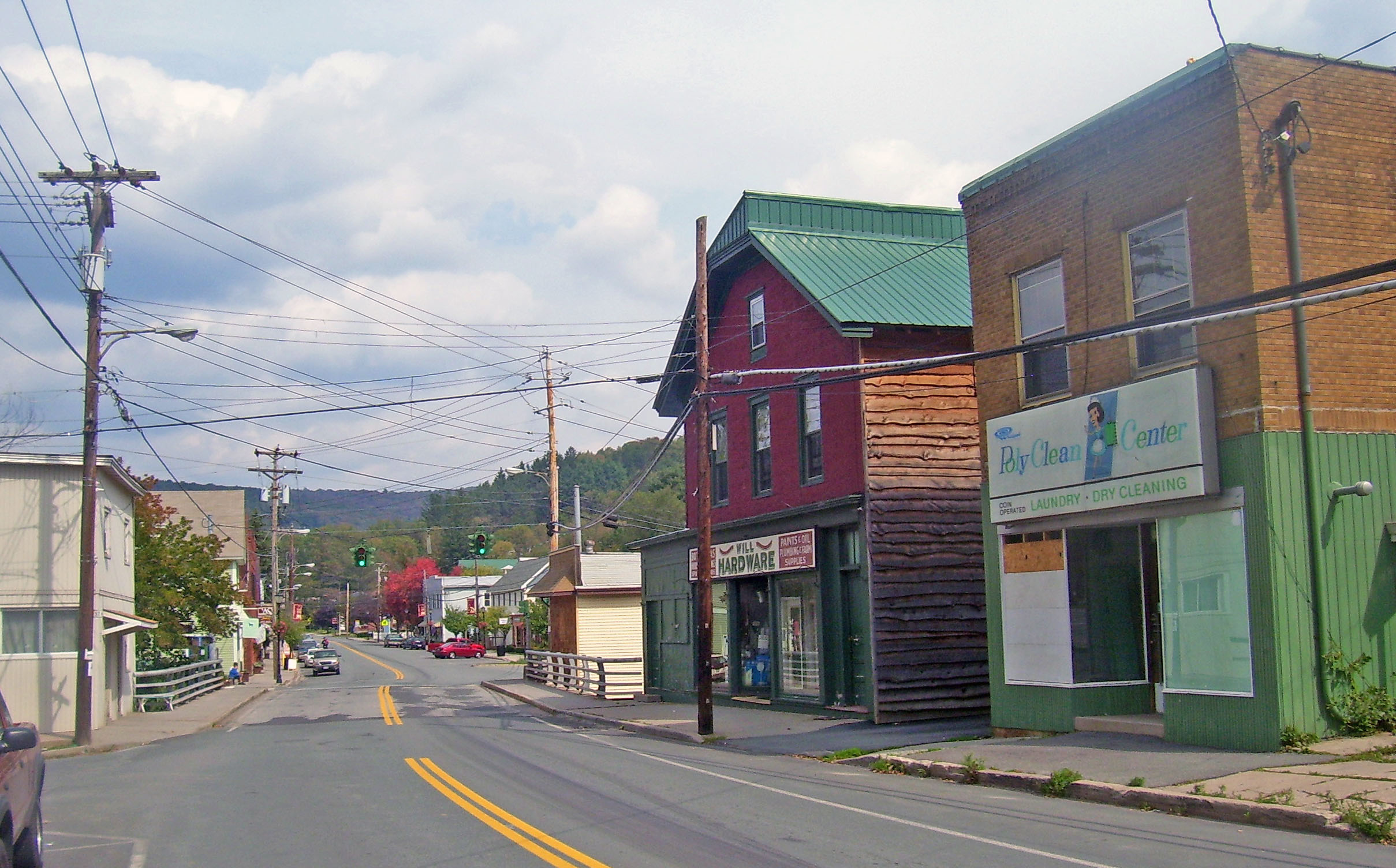
- View north along Main Street
- Etymology: From Livingston family
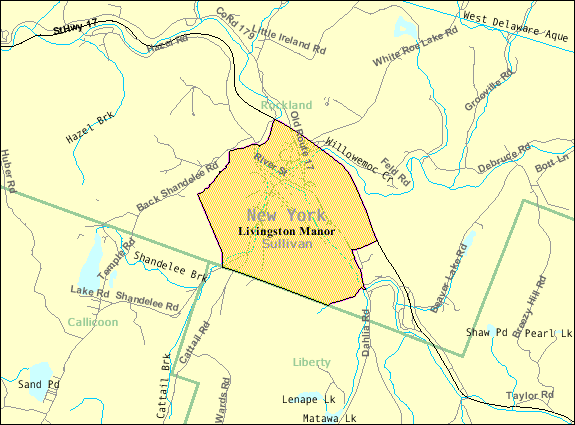
- U.S. Census map of Livingston Manor

- Location within New York Location within the United States
- Coordinates: 41°53′48.2″N 74°49′34.2″W
- Country: United States
- State: New York
- Region: Catskills
- County: Sullivan

Area
  - Total: 3.25 sq mi (8.43 km^{2})
  - Land: 3.24 sq mi (8.40 km^{2})
  - Water: 0.012 sq mi (0.03 km^{2})
- Elevation: 1,401 ft (427 m)

Population (2020)
  - Total: 1,053
  - Density: 324.6/sq mi (125.31/km^{2})
- Time zone: UTC-5 (Eastern (EST))
  - Summer (DST): UTC-4 (EDT)
- ZIP Code: 12758
- Area code: 845
- Exchange: 439
- FIPS code: 36-42928
- GNIS feature ID: 0955750
- Website: livingstonmanorny.com

Livingston Manor is a hamlet (and a census-designated place) in Sullivan County, New York, United States. The population was 1,053 at the 2020 census.

Livingston Manor is located in the southern part of the town of Rockland. New York State Route 17 runs by it.

== History ==
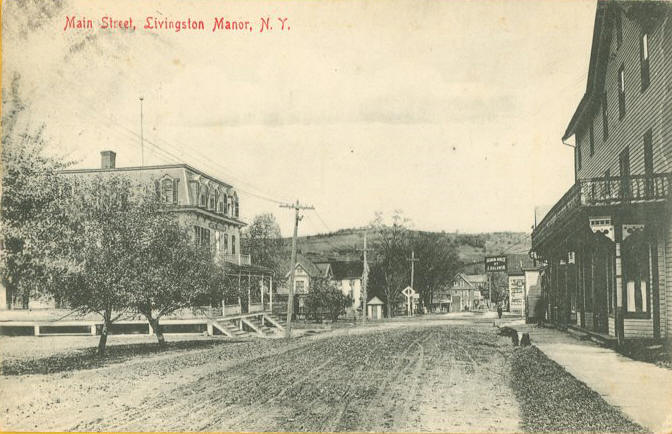
Main Street, from a postcard mailed in 1909

In the late 19th century, this community renamed itself as Livingston Manor, after descendants of the prominent Livingston family who had a house there. But it was not part of the original manor, a huge estate granted by the English Crown about 60 miles (97 km) east in present-day Dutchess and Columbia counties that extended on both sides of the Hudson River. In the early 18th century, the original manor was the site of work camps along the Hudson, where Palatine German refugees worked off their passage to New York paid by the Crown. They produced timber and supplies for the English navy. Later they were allowed to settle in the Schoharie and Mohawk valleys.

The Sullivan County community was part of the Hardenbergh patent in 1716, which included much of the Catskill Mountains.

In 1750, Robert Livingston bought 95,000 acres (380 km^{2}) in this area, shortly after becoming the third (and final) Lord of the manor of Livingston Manor. He sold or leased most of the land by 1780. Robert's third son, John Robert Livingston (1775–1851), deeded 8,441 acres (34.16 km^{2}) to his nephew, Dr. Edward R. Livingston, in 1822 around the area then called Purvis, New York. Edward Livingston died in 1864.

In 1880, the New York, Ontario and Western Railway reached Livingston Manor. Many of its premier trains, such as the Livingston Manor Express, ended there. Passenger service ended in early September, 1953, and the railroad was abandoned on March 30, 1957.

Purvis residents in 1882 chose the new name of Livingston Manor. Edward Livingston's residence, according to a sign in the village, was on a site now occupied by the village firehouse. Another town source says that it was on a site later developed as the Rockland, New York Town Hall.

In the 1930s, a Livingston descendant arrived in Livingston Manor claiming title to his ancestral land, which had previously been held by tenants under lease. He won his case in court. The people whose ancestors had been tenants had to purchase the property they had been living on for years.

Other early settlers were the Benton family. Their immigrant ancestors had come from Essex, England, in the mid-17th century, settling in Guilford, Connecticut. Records show some of their descendants migrated to in Sullivan County in the late 18th century from Connecticut, purchasing a large tract of land in what is now known as the Township of Liberty. They were likely Scots-Irish in ancestry. They took on many jobs in Sullivan County. Other families who acquired land and settled in the surrounding area were the Bascoms, Stewarts, Wests, Harringtons, Williams, Cochrans, Motts, Kimballs, Darbees, Sherwoods, Woodards, Barnharts, and Joselyns. Some descendants of these families still reside in the area.

In the late 19th and early 20th centuries, the village attracted immigrants from eastern Europe. Ashkenazi Jewish immigrants founded the Agudas Achim Synagogue. It was listed on the National Register of Historic Places in 1998.

== Fly fishing in the United States ==
The area claims to be the "birthplace of fly-fishing in the United States" largely because of trout fishing on the 27-mile (43 km)-long Willowemoc Creek. It flows between the village and Roscoe, where it intersects the Beaver Kill. The Catskill Fly Fishing Center and Museum is on the northern edge of the town on the Willowemoc Creek.

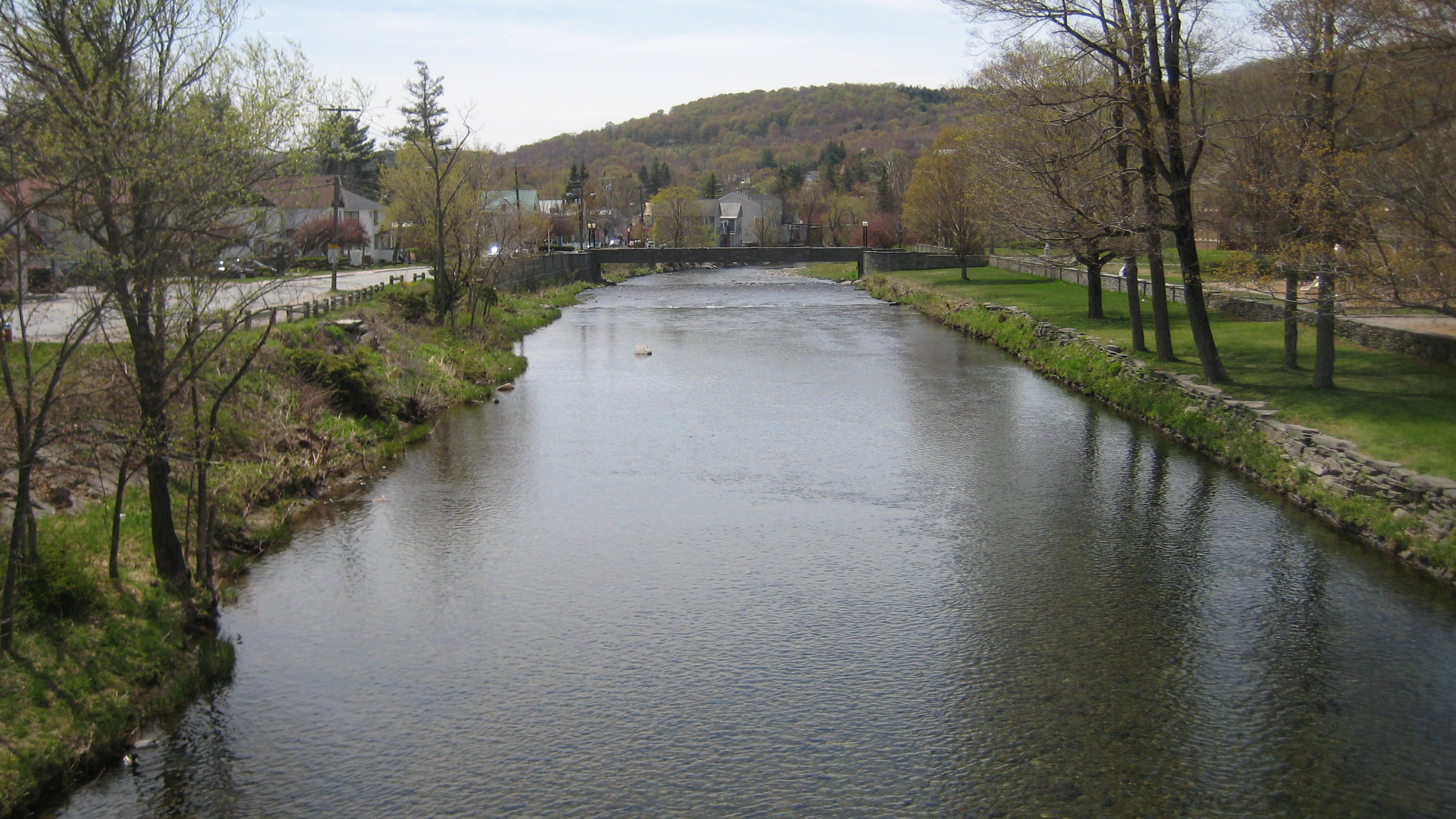
Willowemoc Creek as it enters Livingston Manor

Today fish stocks in the Catskills are managed by state wildlife agents. All of the stocked fish (1 million pounds each year) for the Catskills, as well all the reservoirs in the New York City water supply, are bred at the Catskill Fish Hatchery just northeast of Livingston Manor in DeBruce, New York.

Since 2004, the community has sponsored an annual Trout Parade (organized by the Catskill Art Society and the Chamber of Commerce). It has been compared to the Mermaid Parade.

== Education ==
Livingston Manor Central School District managed the public schools in the township. They consisted of Livingston Manor Central School (middle and high school) and Livingston Manor Elementary School. Livingston Manor's Varsity softball team won the Class D Section 9 State title in 2010 and 2011. The Boys Varsity baseball team won the Class D Section 9 State title in 2011.

Beginning in 2025, the Livingston Manor and Roscoe school districts merged via centralization into a new district, the Rockland Central School District.

== Geography ==
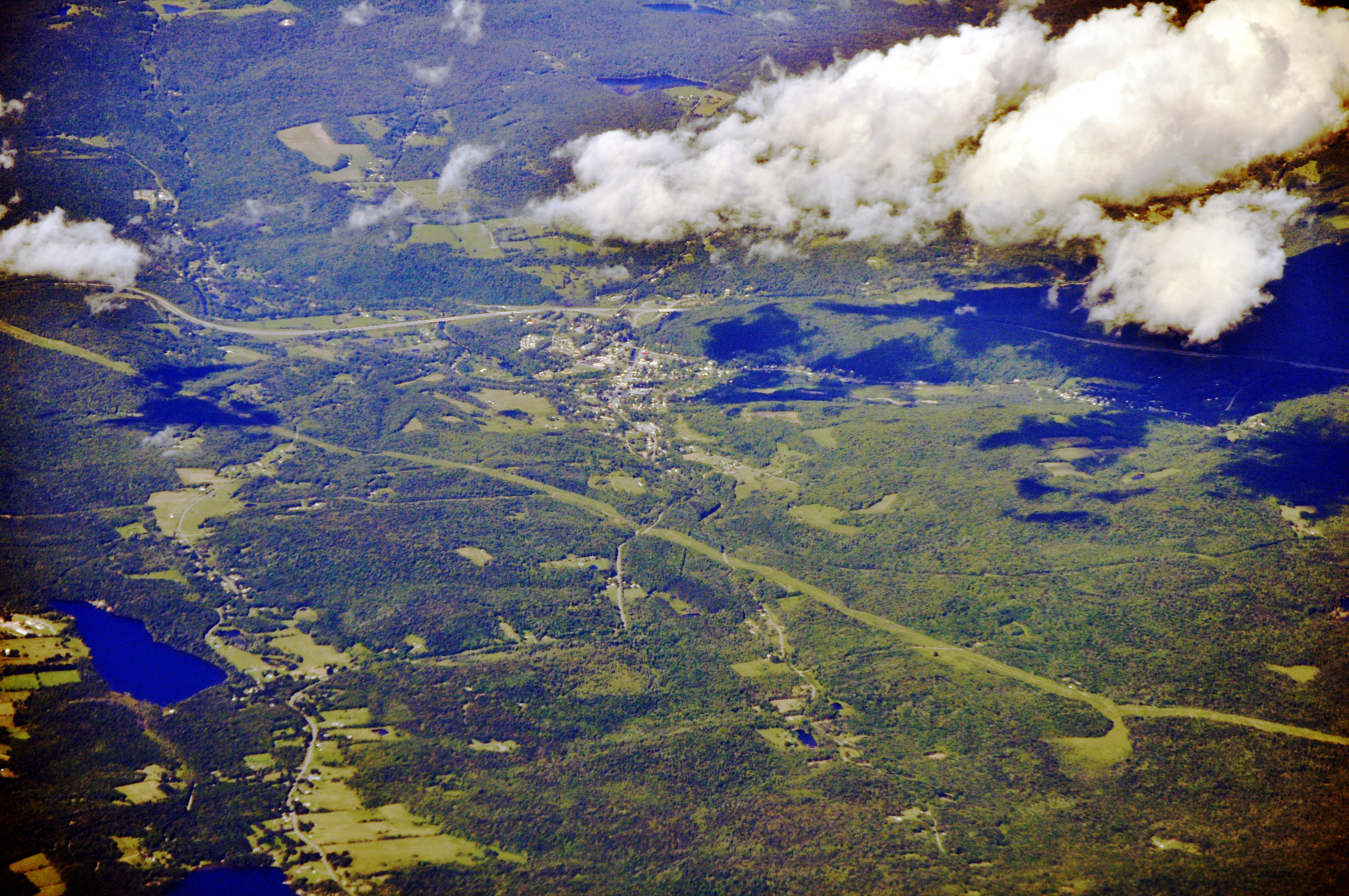
Aerial view of Livingston Manor (at center) and environs roughly from the southwest (2013). Shandelee Lake at lower left.

Livingston Manor is located at 41°53′46″N 74°49′38″W (41.896061, -74.827348). According to the United States Census Bureau, the CDP has a total area of 3.1 square miles (8.0 km^{2}), all land.

== Downtown ==
The downtown of Livingston Manor, mostly along Main Street, has several restaurants, a large grocery store, several art and antique shops. It is the scene of an annual "trout parade" in June that draws marching bands, fire trucks and other local amusements. The Catskill Art Society runs a non-profit multi-arts venue on Main Street, the CAS Arts Center, which offers exhibits on view in their galleries and fine arts classes to the community.

== Flood problems ==
Numerous times in recent history, heavy rain storms significantly increased the flow of the Willowemoc Creek causing flooding of main street and other low lying areas of the hamlet.

== Demographics ==
Historical population
Census	Pop.	Note	%±
2000	1,355		—
2010	1,221		−9.9%
2020	1,053		−13.8%
U.S. Decennial Census

As of the census of 2000, there were 1,355 people, 515 households, and 330 families residing in the CDP. The population density was 437.6 inhabitants per square mile (169.0/km^{2}). There were 619 housing units at an average density of 199.9/mi^{2} (77.1/km^{2}). The racial makeup of the CDP was 85.39% White, 6.20% African American, 0.15% Native American, 0.96% Asian, 5.09% from other races, and 2.21% from two or more races. Hispanic or Latino of any race were 11.81% of the population.

There were 515 households, out of which 33.8% had children under the age of 18 living with them, 41.4% were married couples living together, 16.1% had a female householder with no husband present, and 35.9% were non-families. 28.5% of all households were made up of individuals, and 11.8% had someone living alone who was 65 years of age or older. The average household size was 2.62 and the average family size was 3.21.

In the CDP, the population was spread out, with 31.8% under the age of 18, 7.4% from 18 to 24, 26.0% from 25 to 44, 21.7% from 45 to 64, and 13.1% who were 65 years of age or older. The median age was 35 years. For every 100 females, there were 94.1 males. For every 100 females age 18 and over, there were 90.5 males.

The median income for a household in the CDP was $27,159, and the median income for a family was $29,167. Males had a median income of $22,250 versus $24,375 for females. The per capita income for the CDP was $13,047. About 22.0% of families and 26.1% of the population were below the poverty line, including 41.6% of those under age 18 and 10.0% of those age 65 or over.

Livingston Manor has an excellent Volunteer Fire Department and Volunteer Basic Life Support Ambulance Corps.

== Notable people ==
- Irving Berlin owned a 50-acre farm located in the nearby hamlet of Lew Beach, NY.
- Sam Morrison, jazz saxophonist and flutist
- John Mott, winner of the 1946 Nobel Peace Prize, born in Livingston Manor
- Joan Wulff
- Lee Wulff

== Houses of worship ==
- Methodist Church
- Presbyterian Church
- Cornerstone Community Church (Grooville Free Methodist)
- Main Street Bible Fellowship
- Saint Aloysius Catholic Church /De Bruce branch of Catholic Church open in summer.
- Agudas Achim Synagogue
- Our Lady of Lourdes Monastery
- Willowemoc Baptist Church
- Lew Beach Community Church
