= Crystal Brook (Beaver Kill tributary) =

River in Delaware County, New York

- Location of the mouth of Crystal Brook

Location
- Country: United States
- State: New York
- County: Delaware

Physical characteristics
- Source
  - coordinates: 41°58′31″N 74°59′29″W
- Mouth: Beaver Kill
  - coordinates: 41°57′52″N 75°00′16″W
  - elevation: 1,132 ft (345 m)

Crystal Brook is a river in Delaware County, New York, United States. It flows into Beaver Kill northwest of Butternut Grove.
