= Twadell Brook =

Location
- Country: United States
- State: New York

Physical characteristics
- Source
  - location: Delaware County, New York
- Mouth: Beaver Kill
  - location: East Branch, New York, Delaware County, New York, United States
  - coordinates: 41°59′08″N 75°07′13″W

Twadell Brook is a stream or tributary located in Delaware County and flows into the Beaver Kill watershed by East Branch, New York. This basin is known for its surficial geology and base-flow characteristics, which contribute to its importance as a freestone trout and cold-water stream system.

Twadell Brook has been identified in New York State Natural Heritage Program and DEC species assessments as a site where the brook floater (Alasmidonta varicosa) has been documented or considered in regional surveys. This freshwater mussel is of conservation concern, which highlights the brook's ecological value for supporting sensitive freshwater fauna.

Streamflow measurements are not continuously taken directly on Twadell Brook because it is a small, unmonitored tributary. Instead, hydrologic monitoring and streamflow statistics for the region are reported at Beaver Kill and other nearby basin gauging sites.
