= Ragged Brook =

- Location of the mouth of Ragged Brook

Location
- Country: United States
- State: New York
- County: Delaware

Physical characteristics
- Source
  - coordinates: 41°57′01″N 75°06′17″W
- Mouth: Trout Brook
  - coordinates: 41°57′55″N 75°05′14″W
  - elevation: 1,135 ft (346 m)

Ragged Brook is a river in Delaware County, New York. It flows into Trout Brook south-southeast of Peakville.
