= Ash Clove Brook =

- Location of the mouth of Ash Clove Brook

Location
- Country: United States
- State: New York
- County: Delaware

Physical characteristics
- Source
  - coordinates: 41°56′46″N 75°00′40″W
- Mouth: Trout Brook
  - coordinates: 41°55′54″N 75°01′30″W
  - elevation: 1,614 ft (492 m)

Ash Clove Brook is a river in Delaware County, New York. It flows into Trout Brook southeast of Peakville.
