= Beaverkill Valley Inn =

- U.S. National Register of Historic Places
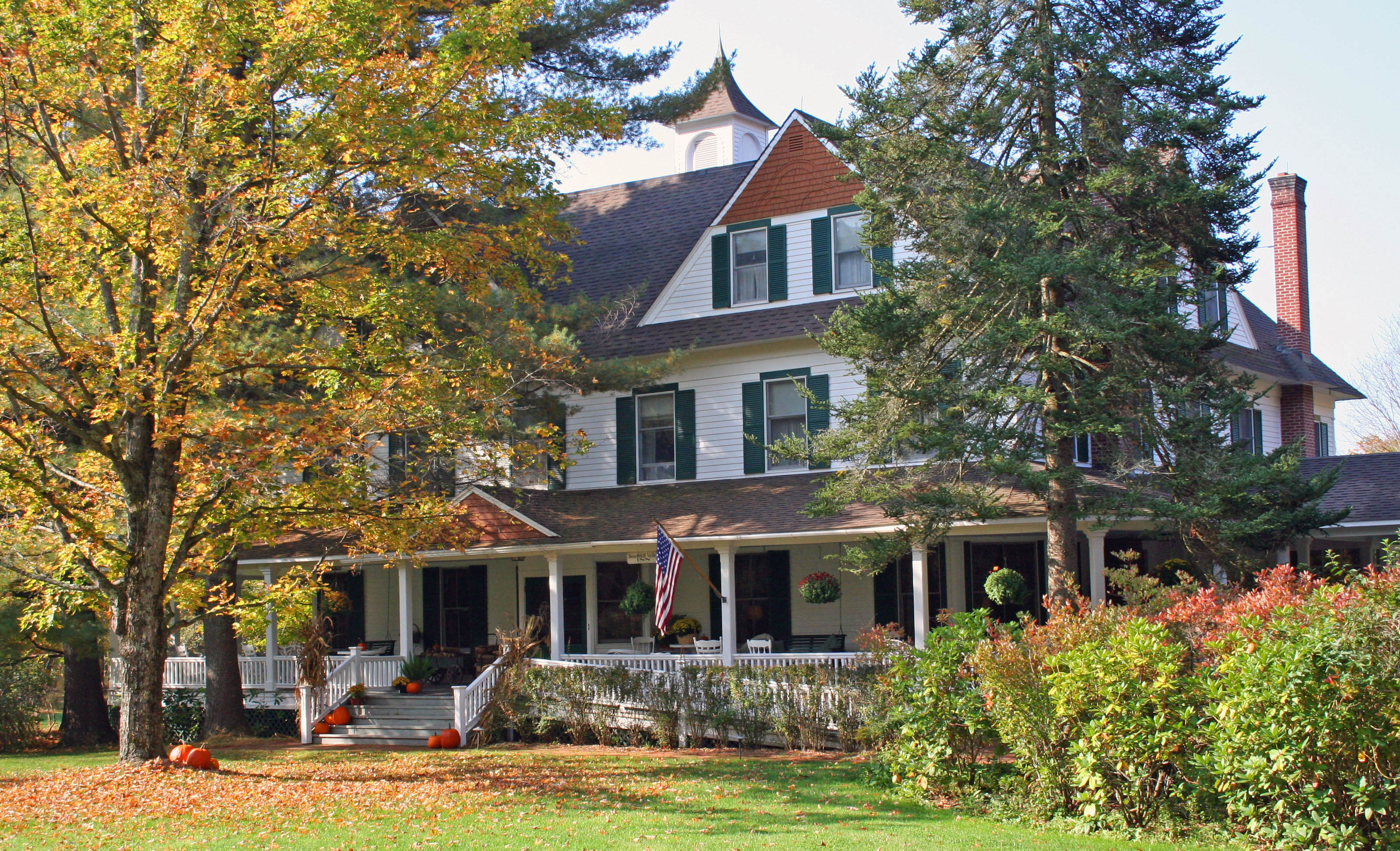
- East elevation and north profile, 2007
- Location: Lew Beach, NY
- Nearest city: Kingston
- Coordinates: 42°1′14″N 74°45′12″W
- Area: 60.7 acres (24.6 ha)
- Built: 1895
- NRHP reference No.: 85002280
- Added to NRHP: September 12, 1985

The Beaverkill Valley Inn, formerly known as The Bonnie View, is located off Beaverkill Road (Ulster County Route 54) north of Lew Beach, New York, United States. It is a large wooden hotel built near the end of the 19th century.

It was built as a lodge for anglers coming to fly fish for trout in the nearby Beaver Kill. It is one of the few fishing lodges remaining from that era of resort development remaining in the Catskills, and the only one along the upper Beaver Kill. In 1985 it was listed on the National Register of Historic Places, the westernmost property in the county with that distinction.

== Property ==
The inn property is a mostly rectangular 60.7-acre (24.6 ha) parcel along Barnhart Road bordered by the Beaver Kill on the south and west, along the stream's flood plain at the foot of a wooded hillside near the Delaware County line, at an elevation of 1,680 feet (510 m) above sea level. There are several other outbuildings and recreational resources on the property besides the inn. All are of recent construction or have been extensively altered from their original appearance; only the inn and the property's section of the river are considered contributing resources.

The main building is a two-story L-shaped frame structure with gabled roof shingled in asphalt and pierced by large gabled dormers with two windows each. It is topped with a cupola with flared hipped roof and louvered arched vents. Siding is clapboard giving way to wood shingles in the gable fields.

A shed-roofed veranda, rounded at the northeast corner, supported by square pillars with simple capitals runs the length of the north, south and east elevations. It is broken by stairways at the center of the six-bay east (front) facade, the eastern end of the south, and a porte-cochère on the north. A railing of square-sawn members also runs the length of the porch; spheres on newel posts are the only decoration. All windows are flanked with louvered shutters

Three single-story wings have been added to the building. The south one takes in an enclosed portion of the veranda and serves as the manager's apartment. The north one houses the kitchen, with a former porch now enclosed to create more space. A west wing with shed dormers on the roof and a deck at the end provides lounge space for guests.

Inside, a central hall is flanked by sitting rooms on the front and the dining room, reception area on the rear with the stairs. The sitting rooms have their original oak trim and brick-and-stone fireplaces. The dining room has the original trim as well, with a new bay window added to let more natural light in. The original turned oak spindlework and balustrade remain on the stairs.

Upstairs, the rooms on the second floor have been enlarged to allow the installation of private bathrooms. The rooms on the third floor are their original size; the shared bathrooms have been enlarged. The original window trim remains on both. The basement has been finished for use as a laundry and game room.

Near the house are two attached frame barns dating to the property's original construction but enlarged today for use as conference rooms and support facilities for an added swimming pool. A wooded area up the hill screens the inn's tennis courts. A new springhouse up Barnhart Road replaced a dilapidated original. Hiking trails and footpaths have been built around the property to connect all these facilities and offer their own recreational possibilities.

== History ==
The combination of minimal arable land, remoteness and continuing land disputes over the Hardenburgh Patent kept the upper Beaverkill Valley from being settled for the first half of the 19th century. The trout in its streams were taken by the few loggers, trappers and (later) tanners who headed up it primarily as food rather than recreation. Their abundance had been written about by Washington Irving as early as 1819, when angling was just beginning to take hold as a recreational activity in the United States. In 1838 The American Turf Register and Sporting Magazine wrote that the Beaver Kill along with Callicoon and Willowemoc creeks were "the three finest trout streams in this country; they are comparatively unknown to city anglers and less fished than any others of like pretension within our knowledge."

The Erie Railroad, and later the Ontario and Western, finally made that region of the Catskills more accessible to city anglers in the later half of the century; they began coming in great numbers. With the decline of the tanning industry and the creation of the state Forest Preserve in the 1880s, tourism, in the form of visiting fishermen, became the main industry in the southwestern Catskills. Those fishermen in turn developed the uniquely American technique of dry-fly trout fishing, epitomized in the writings of area resident Theodore Gordon, known in later years as the father of American dry-fly fishing.

In the 1895–1915 period, Gordon and other pioneers developed the art of fly tying. Early rod builders perfected the split bamboo fly rod. A community of anglers developed around the Beaverkill and other Catskill rivers, in and out of the private clubs they established to preserve exclusive rights to river frontage. Their lore named pools and bends. They stocked and protected and preserved them. In later years they helped prevent the damming of the Beaverkill and Willowemoc for New York City reservoirs.

Hotels and other accommodations were built to cater to sport fishermen during those years, regarded as a golden age of Catskill fly fishing. Three remain today — Antrim Lodge and the Central House in Roscoe, the center of recreational fishing in the Catskills, and the Beaverkill Valley Inn, founded in 1895 as the Bonnie View by a local married couple. Its architecture is typical of the late Victorian architectural styles of its time, with comforts such as its veranda and fireplaces that an affluent male urban guest would have appreciated, built specifically as a fisherman's hotel.

In the early 1980s, new owners renovated the outbuildings, added other recreational facilities and renamed it the Beaverkill Valley Inn. Of the 18 hotels, farmhouses or rooming houses that had fishermen as guests along the upper Beaverkill (above Roscoe), it is the only one intact and in continuous operation today.

== See also ==
- National Register of Historic Places listings in Ulster County, New York
