= Herrieden =

- Town
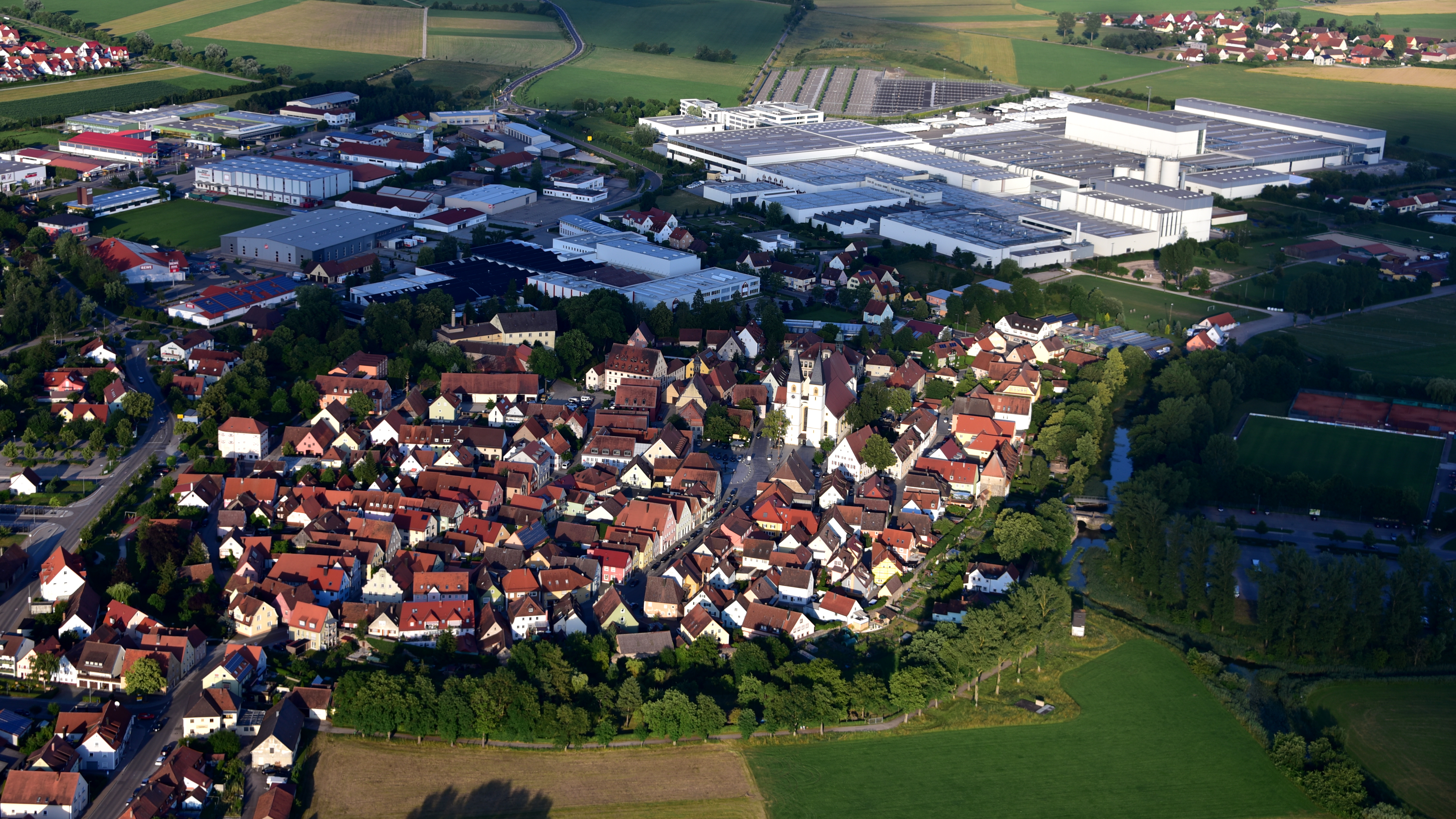
- Aerial view

- Coat of arms

- Location of Herrieden within Ansbach district
- Interactive map of Herrieden
- Location within Germany Location within Bavaria
- Coordinates: 49°13′N 10°31′E
- Country: Germany
- State: Bavaria
- Admin. region: Mittelfranken
- District: Ansbach
- Subdivisions: 38 Ortsteile

Government
  - Mayor (2020–26): Dorina Jechnerer

Area
  - Total: 81.66 km^{2} (31.53 sq mi)
- Elevation: 423 m (1,388 ft)

Population (2025-12-31)
  - Total: 8,241
  - Density: 100.9/km^{2} (261.4/sq mi)
- Time zone: UTC+01:00 (CET)
  - Summer (DST): UTC+02:00 (CEST)
- Postal codes: 91567
- Dialling codes: 09825
- Vehicle registration: AN
- Website: www.herrieden.de

Herrieden (German pronunciation: [hɛˈʁiːdn̩]) is a town in the district of Ansbach and situated in the Middle Franconia region of Bavaria, Germany. It lies along the upper Altmühl river, about 9 km (6 mi) southwest of the city of Ansbach, 47 km southwest of the city of Nürnberg, 95 km east of Heilbronn and 144 km northwest of Munich.

It is part of a community association with the nearby municipalities of Aurach, Burgoberbach, and Leutershausen.

Herrieden is located close to the A6 autobahn between Nürnberg and Heilbronn. Herrieden is administratively over the large towns of Neunstetten to the north, Rauenzell to the east and Elbersroth to the southwest. Other villages administratively under Herrieden include Birkach, Bittelhof, Böckau, Brünst, Buschhof, Esbach, Gimpertshausen, Gräbenwinden, Heuberg, Höfstetten, Hohenberg, Lammelbach, Lattenbuch, Leibelbach, Leuckersdorf, Leutenbuch, Limbach, Manndorf, Mühlbruck, Niederdombach, Oberschönbronn, Regmannsdorf, Rös, Roth, Sauerbach, Schernberg, Schönau, Seebronn, Sickersdorf, Stadel, Stegbruck, Steinbach, Velden and Winn.

The first recorded settlement of Herrieden was a monastery called Hasenried (Latin Nazaruda) in 782.
