= Stadel Mountain =

Mountain in New York, United States

- Location within New York Location within the United States

Highest point
- Elevation: 2,224 feet (678 m)
- Coordinates: 41°59′48″N 74°59′33″W

Geography
- Location: Gregorytown, New York, U.S.
- Topo map: USGS Roscoe

Stadel Mountain is a mountain located in the Catskill Mountains of New York southeast of Gregorytown. Morton Hill is located east, and Baxter Mountain is located west-northwest of Stadel Mountain.
