= Whirling Eddy Brook =

- Location of the mouth of Whirling Eddy Brook

Location
- Country: United States
- State: New York
- County: Delaware

Physical characteristics
- Source
  - coordinates: 41°57′20″N 75°01′54″W
- Mouth: Beaver Kill
  - coordinates: 41°58′08″N 75°02′43″W
  - elevation: 1,079 ft (329 m)

Whirling Eddy Brook is a river in Delaware County, New York. It flows into Beaver Kill southeast of the hamlet of Elk Brook.
