= Lew Beach, New York =

- Hamlet
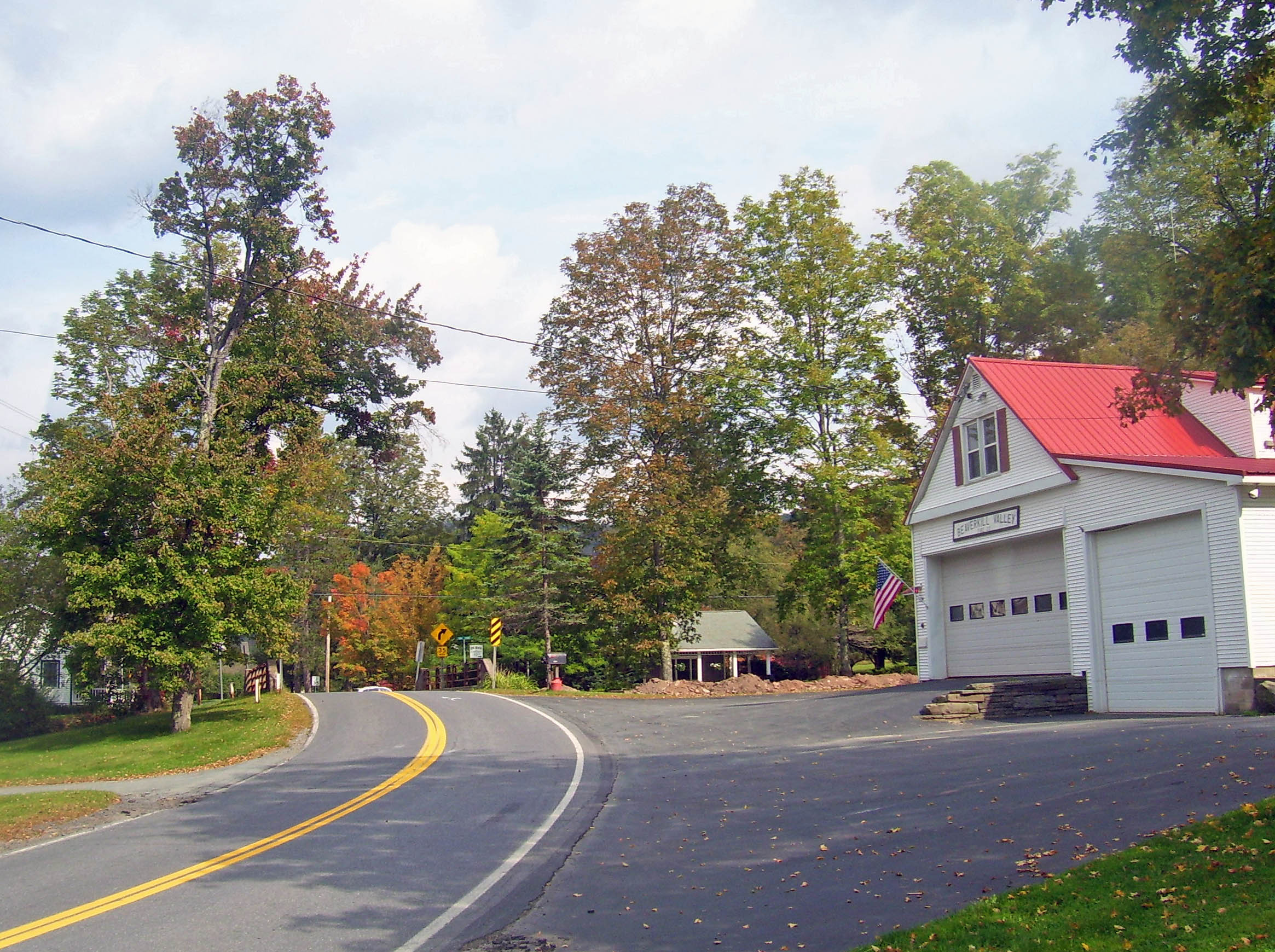
- Downtown Lew Beach

- Location within the state of New York
- Coordinates: 42°0′17″N 74°47′6″W
- Country: United States
- State: New York
- County: Sullivan
- Town: Rockland
- Time zone: UTC-5 (Eastern (EST))
  - Summer (DST): UTC-4 (EDT)

Lew Beach is a hamlet in the town of Rockland, New York, United States. It is at the northernmost corner of the town and thus also of Sullivan County, near the tripoint with Delaware and Ulster counties, within the Catskill Park. Its ZIP code, 12758, extends into the neighboring sections of the latter county's town of Hardenburgh, and some of those areas are considered part of Lew Beach as well.

Its small downtown is located at the confluence of Shin Creek and the Beaver Kill, which brings many fly fishermen to Lew Beach during New York's trout season. It has a few houses, a church, store, firehouse, and park with baseball field.

== History ==
Originally the hamlet was named "Shin Creek", after the Beaver Kill's tributary that flows through town. It was later renamed "Lew Beach" after US Congressman Lewis Beach (March 30, 1835 – August 10, 1886).

The Beaverkill Valley Inn was listed on the National Register of Historic Places in 1985.
