= Roaring Brook (Peakville, Beaver Kill tributary) =

- Location of the mouth of Roaring Brook

Location
- Country: United States
- State: New York
- County: Delaware

Physical characteristics
- Source
  - coordinates: 41°58′26″N 75°03′49″W
- Mouth: Beaver Kill
  - coordinates: 41°58′58″N 75°04′12″W
  - elevation: 1,060 ft (320 m)

Roaring Brook is a river in Delaware County, New York. It flows into Beaver Kill east of the hamlet of Peakville.
