= Horse Brook (Trout Brook tributary) =

- Location of the mouth of Horse Brook

Location
- Country: United States
- State: New York
- County: Delaware

Physical characteristics
- Source
  - coordinates: 41°57′17″N 75°06′35″W
- Mouth: Trout Brook
  - coordinates: 41°58′26″N 75°05′46″W
  - elevation: 1,056 ft (322 m)

Horse Brook is a river in Delaware County, New York. It flows into Trout Brook south of Peakville.
