= Roaring Brook (Roscoe, Beaver Kill tributary) =

- Location of the mouth of Roaring Brook

Location
- Country: United States
- State: New York
- County: Delaware

Physical characteristics
- Source
  - coordinates: 41°57′55″N 74°56′41″W
- Mouth: Beaver Kill
  - coordinates: 41°57′22″N 74°56′38″W
  - elevation: 1,220 ft (370 m)

Roaring Brook is a river in Delaware County, New York. It flows into the Beaver Kill northwest of Roscoe.
