= Beaver Kill =

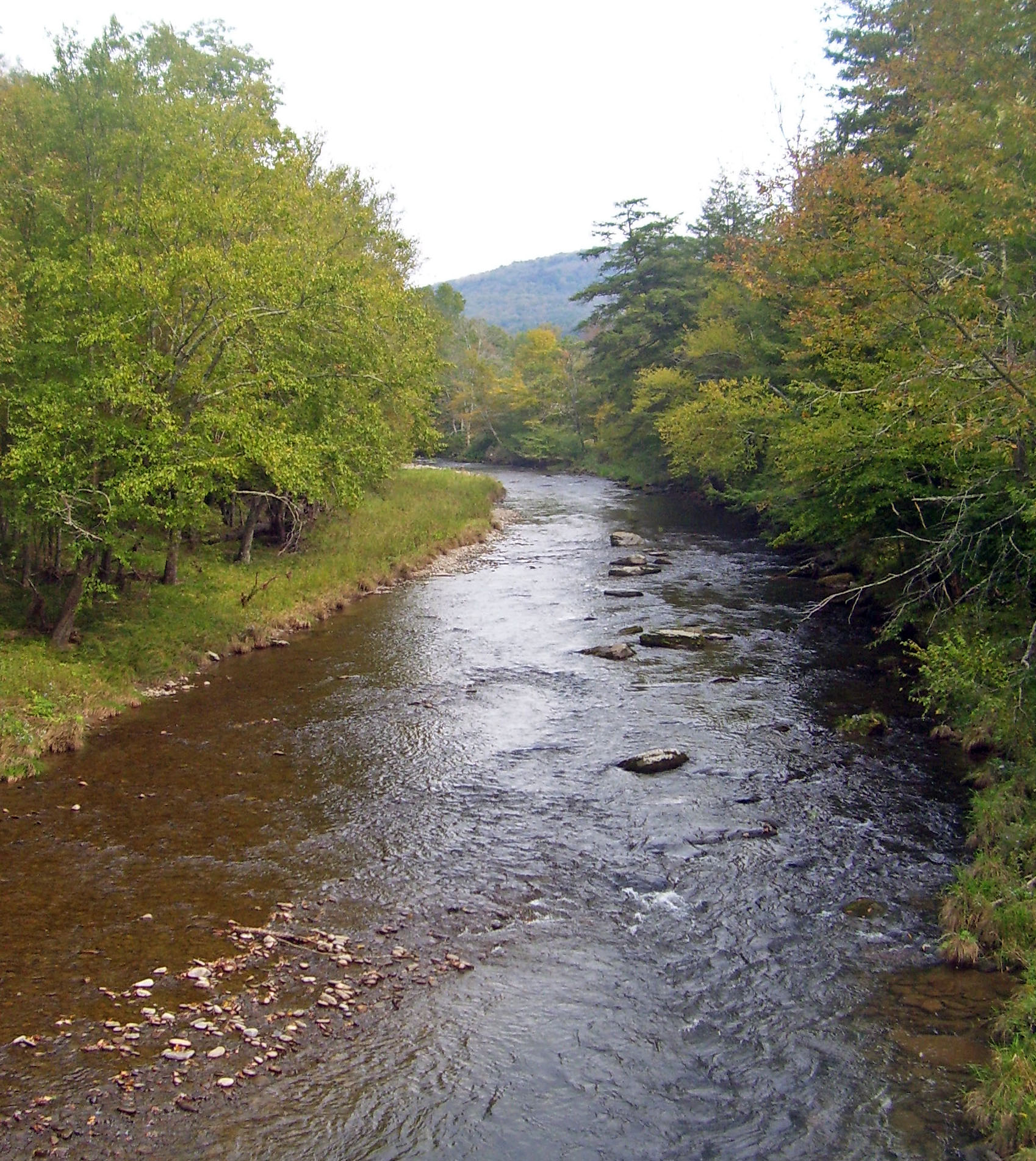
- Beaver Kill below Lew Beach

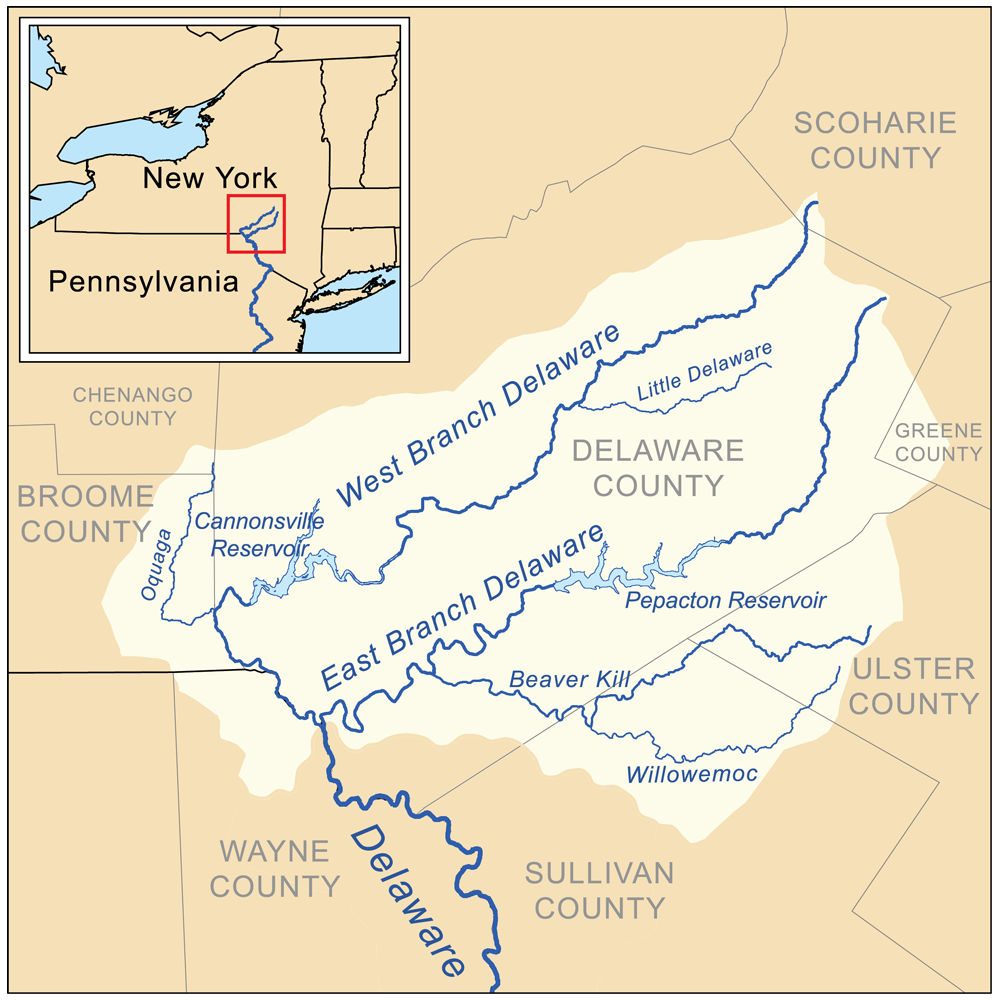
- Beaver Kill within the Delaware headwaters drainage basin.

Location
- Country: United States
- State: New York
- Region: Catskills
- Counties: Ulster, Sullivan, Delaware
- Towns: Hardenburgh, Rockland, Colchester, Hancock

Physical characteristics
- Source: S of col between Graham and Doubletop mountains
  - coordinates: 42°1′47″N 74°32′32″W
  - elevation: 2,760 ft (840 m)
- Mouth: East Branch Delaware River
  - coordinates: 41°59′24″N 74°7′52″W
  - elevation: 980 ft (300 m)
- Length: 44 mi (71 km), NE-SW
- Basin size: 300 sq mi (780 km^{2})
- Discharge
  - average: 771 cu ft/s (21.8 m^{3}/s)
  - maximum: 62,400 cu ft/s (1,770 m^{3}/s)

Basin features
- River system: East Branch Delaware River
- Tributaries
  - left: Willowemoc Creek

The Beaver Kill, sometimes written as the Beaverkill or Beaverkill River, is a tributary of the East Branch Delaware River, a main tributary of the Delaware River, approximately 44 miles (71 km) long, in the U.S. state of New York. The kill drains a 300-square-mile (780 km^{2}) area of the Catskill Mountains and has long been celebrated as one of the most famous trout streams in the United States. Its preservation helped establish many of the basic conservation principles of rivers in the United States.

The river has been popular as a trout stream since the early 19th century, when it became one of the first resort destinations in the United States. The subsequent depletion of the brook trout population by the 1850s led to an early conservation movement to preserve the river, including the introduction of hatcheries for brown trout. Its popularity as a trout stream arises in part from the many cold springs and deep pools in the upper river that keep the water at an even cold temperature. The fly fishing industry is centered on Roscoe, home to several fly-shops and bed and breakfasts catering to fishermen from around the world. More local fly fishing history and information can be found at the Catskill Fly Fishing Center and Museum located in Livingston Manor.

== Course ==
The Beaver Kill rises in western Ulster County, beginning at an elevation of 2,760 feet (840 m) just south of the col between Graham and Doubletop mountains, two of the Catskill High Peaks in the Town of Hardenburgh. It descends gently from here, first on private land belonging to the descendants of Jay Gould, then into the Big Indian-Beaverkill Range Wilderness Area, part of the Forest Preserve in the Catskill Park. Shortly after entering state land, it receives its first tributary, an unnamed stream that flows down steeply from the southeast slopes of Doubletop.

At its first crossing, the Neversink-Hardenburgh Trail, the stream turns west and enters a different state-owned parcel, the Balsam Lake Mountain Wild Forest, paralleling the trail for two miles (3 km) to the Quaker Clearing trailhead at the end of Beaverkill Road. Here it turns southwest again and parallels the road through the minimally developed valley, widening slightly as it does, and receiving from the north tributaries such as Alder Creek. It gradually moves to a more westerly direction until just short of the Delaware County line it turns southwest again and parallels it just past the small hamlet of Lew Beach where it enters Sullivan County.

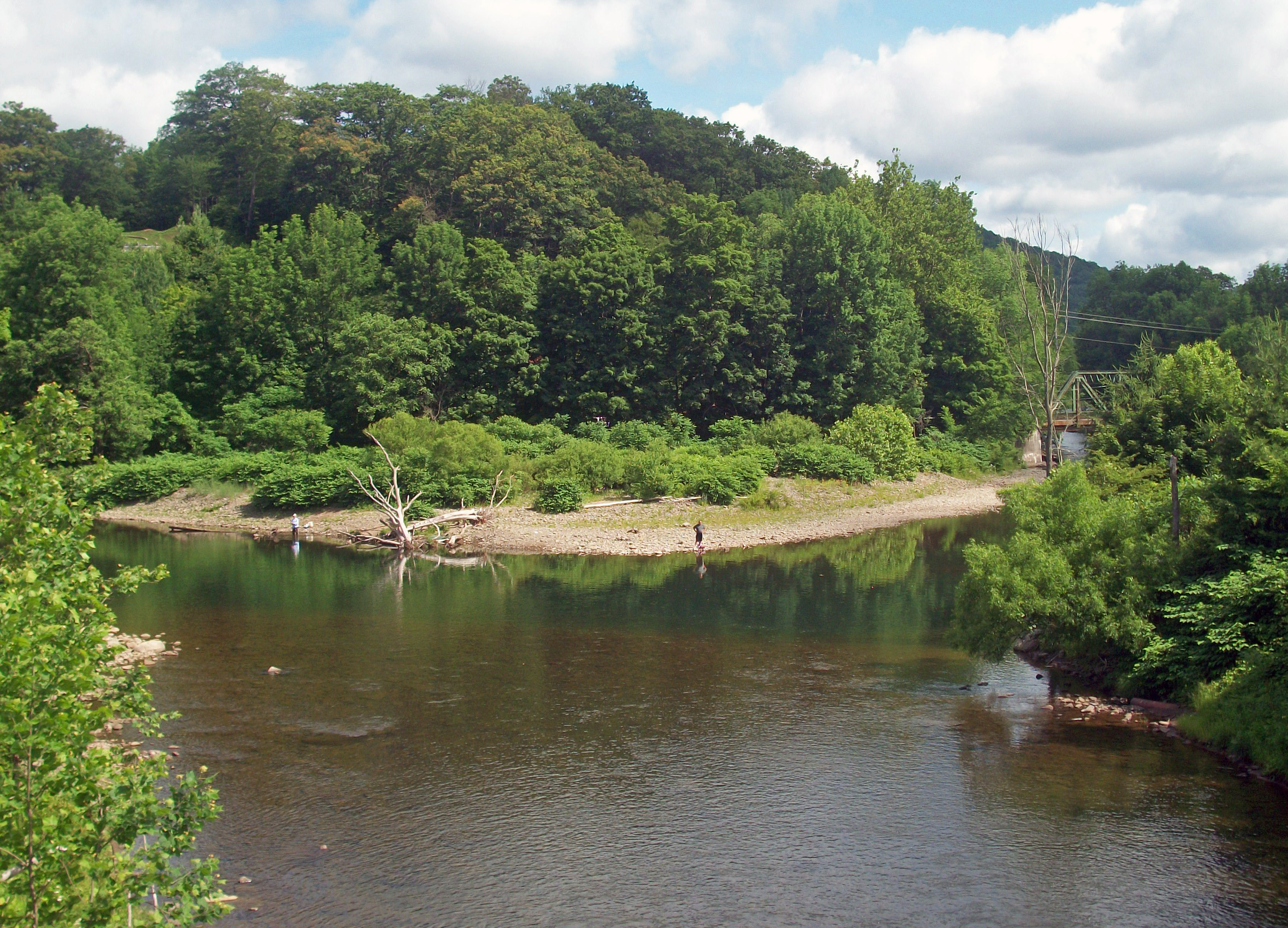
The Junction Pool

Here it keeps the same course. The covered Beaverkill Bridge crosses it at the Beaverkill State Campground, a popular fishing spot. After briefly bending into Delaware County it reaches the only significant settlement along its length, the hamlet of Roscoe, where its largest tributary, Willowemoc Creek, joins it from the east at the Junction Pool, the Beaver Kill's best-known fishing hole. The confluence also marks the point where the Beaver Kill becomes part of the Blue Line, the boundary of the Catskill Park.

It also starts to parallel another road, the NY 17 expressway slowly being converted into Interstate 86. Widening and turning westward again, it soon enters Delaware County and the Town of Colchester for good, passing the small hamlet of Cooks Falls shortly afterwards. The river and the highway remain close, intersecting several times. At the Hancock town line, the Blue Line leaves the river.

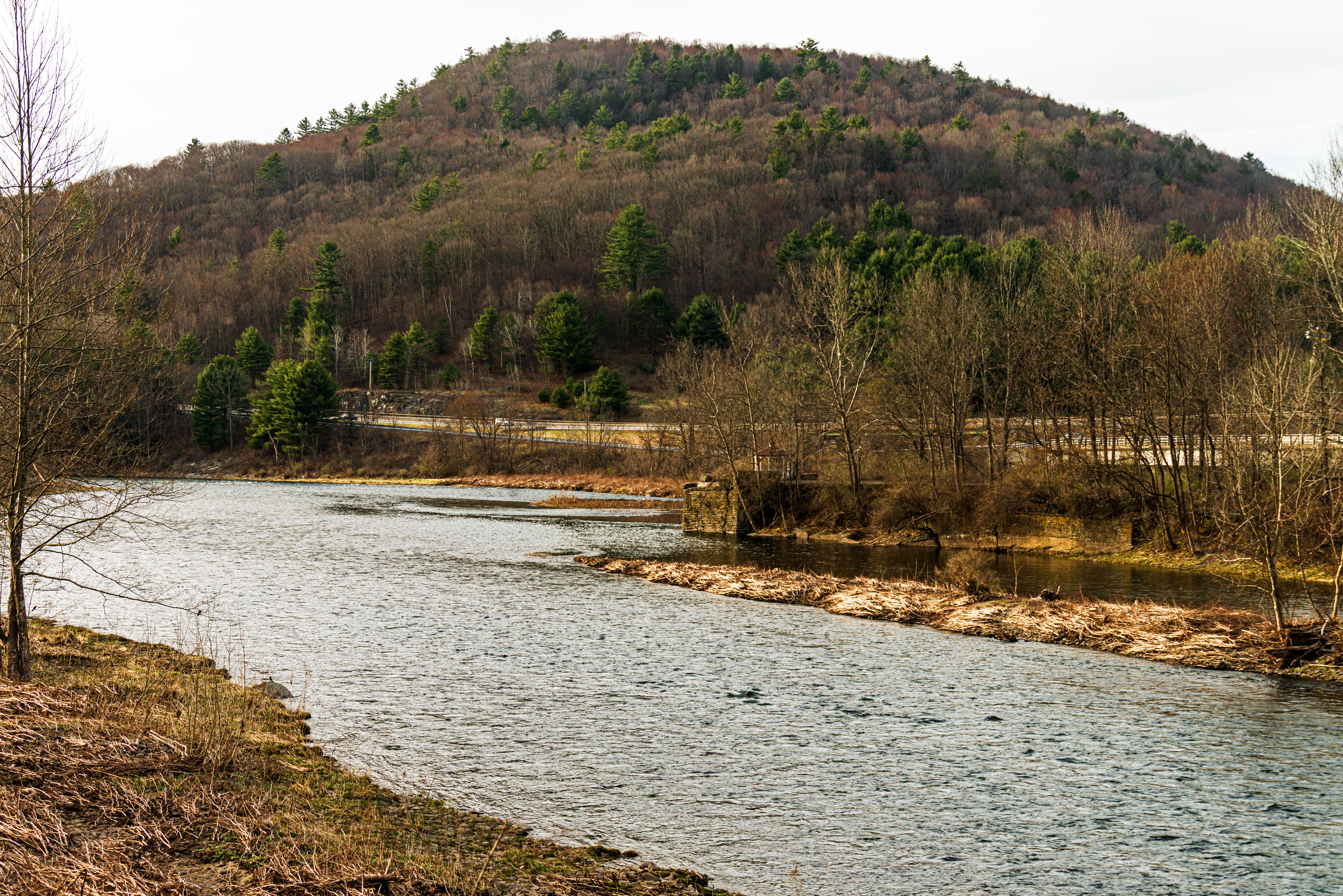
Mouth at the East Branch Delaware River

For its last few miles, it bends northward slightly, staying alongside Route 17. At the hamlet of East Branch, it drains into the East Branch of the Delaware River, approximately 10 miles (16 km) northeast of where it joins the West Branch to form the Delaware's main stem.

== Tributaries ==
Right
Gulf of Mexico Brook
Black Brook
Beecher Brook
Scudder Brook
Alder Creek
Upper Beech Hill Brook
Mary Smith Brook
Berry Brook
Spring Brook
Horse Brook
Roaring Brook
Russell Brook
Crystal Brook
Horton Brook
Spooner Brook
Twadell Brook

Left
Shin Creek
Voorhees Brook
Jersey Brook
Willowemoc Creek
Abe Wood Brook
Cook Brook
Whirling Eddy Brook
Roaring Brook
Trout Brook

== History ==
The combination of its remoteness and contentious disputes over land titles in the Catskills stemming from the Hardenburgh Patent kept the Beaver Kill area unsettled and undeveloped well into the 19th century. Only loggers and trappers visited the area, on a road built in 1815. They told others of the river's clear waters and ample supply of trout, which Washington Irving wrote of in 1819, noting that its isolation kept it out of easy reach of city dwellers attracted to the new sport of angling.

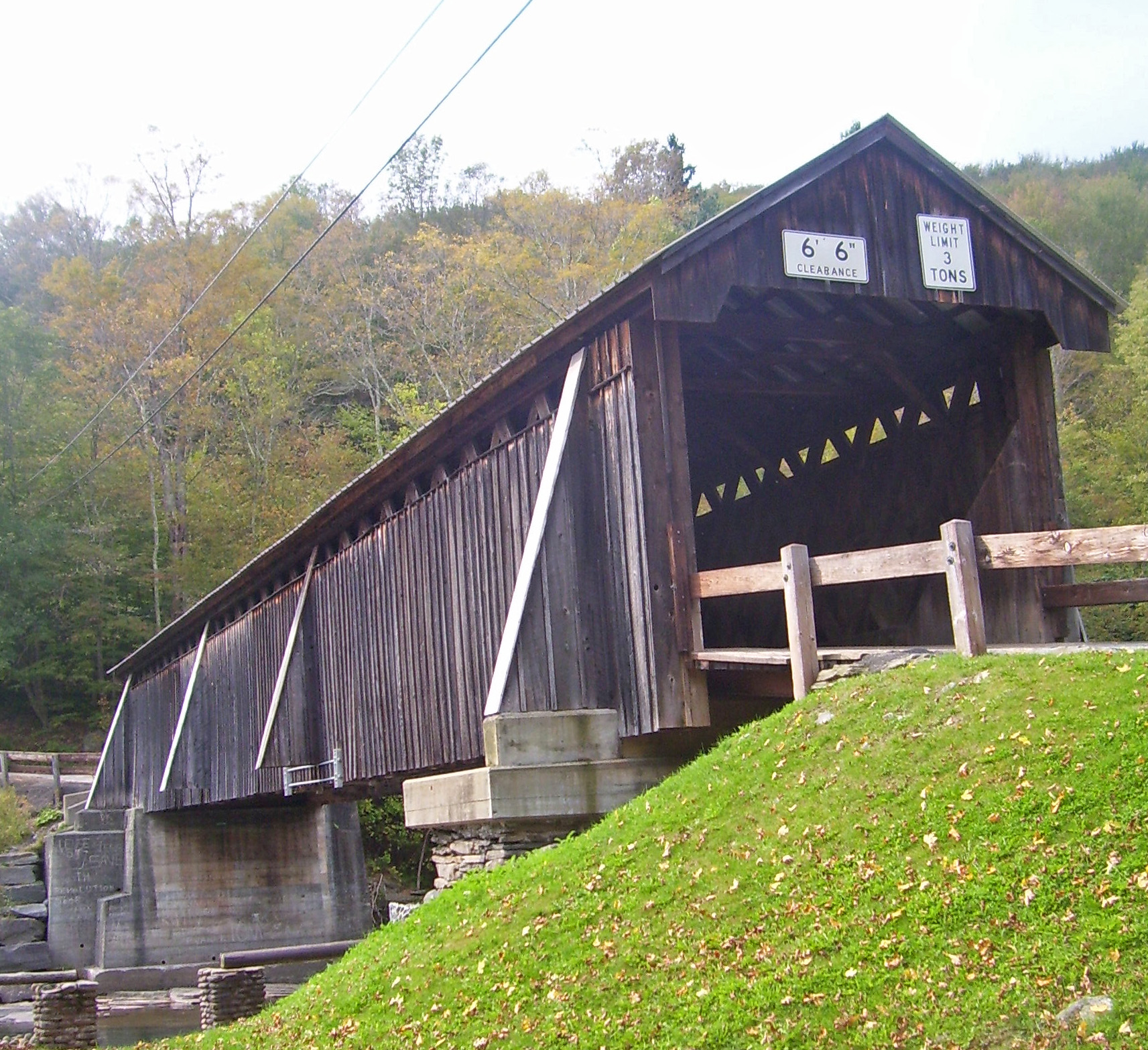
Beaverkill Bridge

Later in the century the valley's first significant industry adversely affected the water quality the trout depended on. Tanneries opened up, harvesting tannin from the bark of the extensive Eastern Hemlock stands on the mountain slopes. There were eventually eight in the valley, their effluents clouding the river and making it less attractive to trout. Charcoal makers also released acids into the river, further affecting its quality. The industries were prosperous enough to sustain the settlements of Beaverkill, where the oldest extant bridge over the river was constructed in 1865, and Shin Creek (today Lew Beach).

Those industries faded away due to changes in technology and depletion of forest resources in the 1880s. That same decade, New York created the Forest Preserve, by which state landholdings in the Adirondacks and Catskills were to be kept forever wild. This shift to conservation helped the region sustain a new tourism economy, as rail connections, and later the automobile, brought dry-fly fishermen to the valley. Many of the new sport's early publicizers, like Theodore Gordon, wrote about the trout of the Beaver Kill, particularly the Junction Pool, rich in fish because the trout could not decide which river to swim up, and the waters from there down to the East Branch.

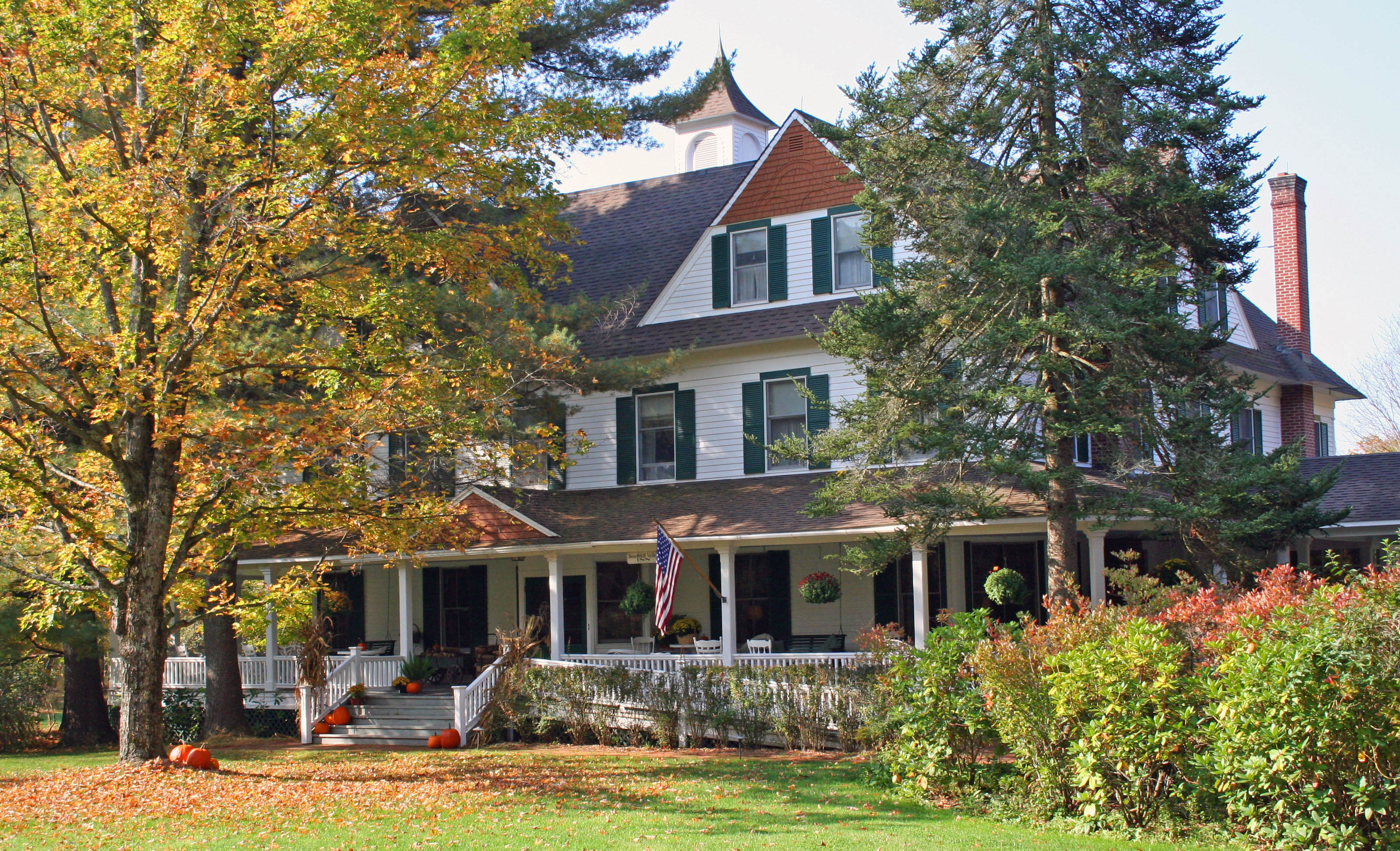
The Beaverkill Valley Inn, a surviving fishing hotel now listed on the National Register of Historic Places

The new attention caused different problems. Overfishing led conservationists and private clubs to buy large sections of the river's banks all the way up to almost its headwaters. The state built Beaverkill campground in the 1920s, one of its first in the Catskill Park, to concentrate angler impact in one area.

In the years after World War II, the river faced the prospect of being dammed by New York City for its water supply, along with the Willowemoc. The fly-fishing community opposed this strongly, and eventually when test borings showed that the bedrock in those valleys could not support the necessary dams, the city relented. It chose to acquire land along both branches of the Delaware and build Cannonsville and Pepacton reservoirs instead.

Anglers later protested the construction of the Quickway, the expressway section of Route 17, along the river. Their efforts resulted in some slight rerouting, and a section near Cooks Falls where the two roadways were stacked on each other in a narrow passage between state Forest Preserve land and the river. It does not appear to have had, by itself, the adverse impact on runoff and stream flows that was originally feared, although both have increased since the highway's construction.

== See also ==
- List of New York rivers
