= Horse Brook (Beaver Kill tributary) =

Location
- Country: United States
- State: New York
- County: Delaware

Physical characteristics
- Source: Lake Mimi
  - location: NNW of Roscoe, New York
  - coordinates: 41°59′19″N 74°55′36″W
  - elevation: 2,087 ft (636 m)
- Mouth: Beaver Kill
  - location: NW of Roscoe, New York
  - coordinates: 41°57′23″N 74°56′04″W
  - elevation: 1,217 ft (371 m)
- Basin size: 2.64 mi^{2} (6.8 km^{2})

Horse Brook is a river in Delaware County, New York. It drains Lake Mimi and flows south before converging with Beaver Kill northwest of Roscoe.
