= Livingston Manor Central School District =

School district in the U.S. state of New York

Address
- 19 School Street Livingston Manor, Sullivan County, New York, 12758-0947; United States

District information
- Type: Public school district
- Grades: PK-12
- Established: 1938; 88 years ago
- Superintendent: John Evans
- Schools: 2
- Budget: $17,884,000
- NCES District ID: 3617580
- District ID: NY-591302040000

Students and staff
- Students: 424
- Teachers: 52.99 (on an FTE basis)
- Staff: 27.50 (on an FTE basis)
- Student–teacher ratio: 8:1
- District mascot: Wildcat
- Colors: Maroon and Gray

Other information
- Website: www.lmcs.k12.ny.us

Livingston Manor Central School District is a school district in Livingston Manor, New York, United States. The superintendent is John Evans.

== History ==
The Livingston Manor High School was built in 1938. It is located on the peninsula of Sherwood Island.

In December 2024, voters in the district voted to merge with the Roscoe Central School District to form Rockland Central School District, effective July 1, 2025.

== Extracurricular activities ==
Livingston Manor competes in Section IX Class "D" for all sports. They were the 2010 and 2011 Class "D" State Champions in Softball and the 2011 State Champion for Baseball. Livingston Manor holds at least 1 Section title in every sports program they have. Former Softball Standout Marissa Diescher was inducted into the New York State High School Softball Hall of Fame as part of the Induction Class of 2022.
