= Stadel bei Herrieden =

Coordinates: 49°13.7′N 10°26.6′E

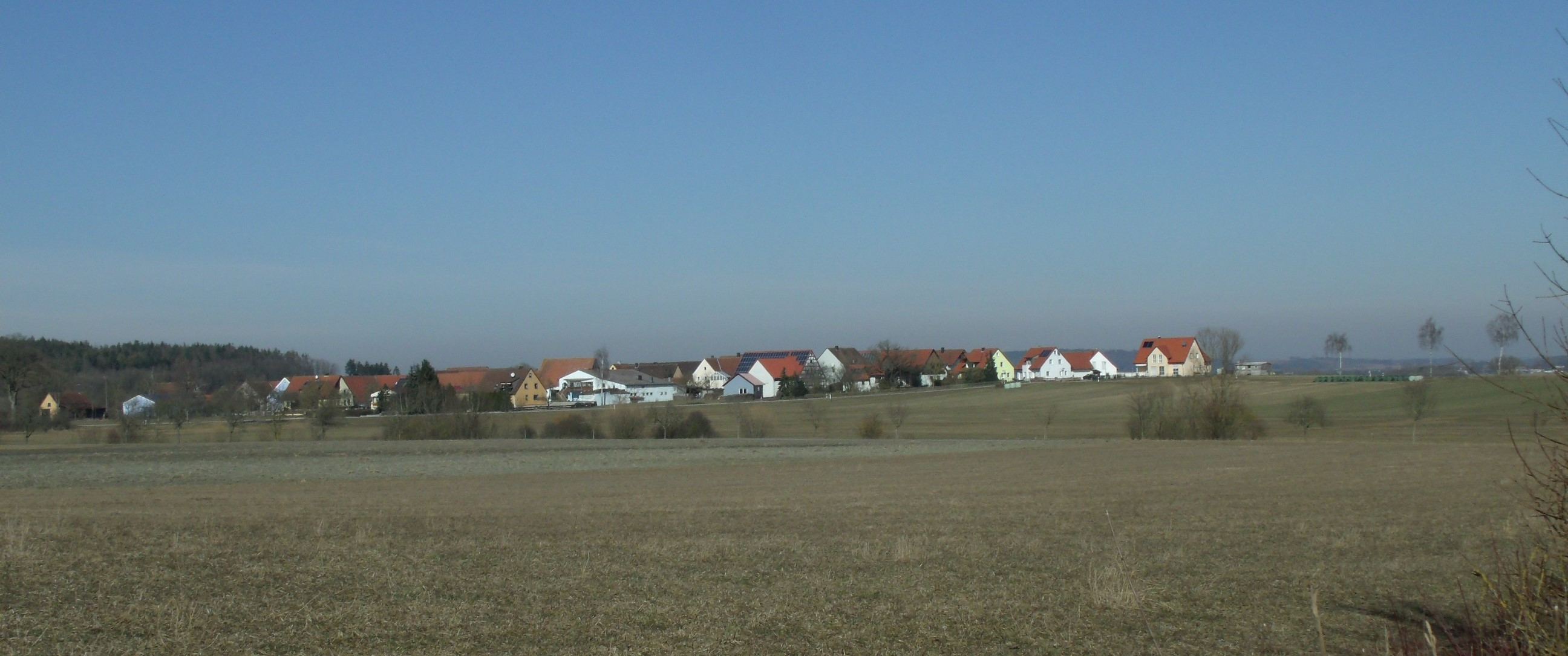
View towards the village

Stadel bei Herrieden is a farm village of approximately 120 residents that is administratively part of the large town of Herrieden and administratively within the city/district of Ansbach. Stadel is situated in the Middle Franconia region of Bavaria, Germany. It is 2 km west of the upper Altmühl river on the main road between the small cities of Herrieden and Aurach. Stadel is about 11 km (7 mi) southwest of the city of Ansbach, 49 km southwest of the city of Nürnberg, 93 km east of Heilbronn and 143 km northwest of Munich. It is situated immediately east of the village of Stegbruck, west of the town of Aurach, north of the village of Schönau and south of the village of Hillsbach. Stadel is the seventh largest village under the town of Herrieden.

Stadel is home to Herrieden's model airplane center, which hosts major international competitions.
