= Rockland, New York =

Town in Sullivan County, New York, US

- Town
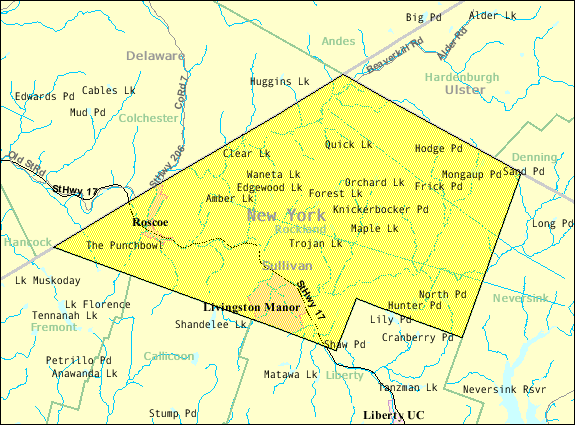
- U.S. Census Map

- Location of Rockland in Sullivan County, New York
- Coordinates: 41°55′46″N 74°49′19″W
- Country: United States
- State: New York
- County: Sullivan

Area
  - Total: 95.27 sq mi (246.75 km^{2})
  - Land: 94.15 sq mi (243.86 km^{2})
  - Water: 1.11 sq mi (2.88 km^{2})
- Elevation: 2,116 ft (645 m)

Population (2020)
  - Total: 3,290
  - Density: 34.9/sq mi (13.5/km^{2})
- Time zone: UTC−5 (Eastern (EST))
  - Summer (DST): UTC−4 (EDT)
- FIPS code: 36-63176
- GNIS feature ID: 0979428

Rockland is a town in the northern part of Sullivan County, New York, United States. At the 2020 census, the population was 3,290.

== History ==
The town, as with most of this part of New York, was part of the Hardenburgh Patent. The town was first settled circa 1789. The town was established in 1910 from the western part of the town of Neversink.

== Geography ==
The northwestern town line is the border of Delaware County, and the northeastern town boundary is the border of Ulster County. Most of the town is within the Catskill Park.

According to the United States Census Bureau, the town has a total area of 95.2 square miles (247 km^{2}), of which 94.3 square miles (244 km^{2}) is land and 1.0 square mile (2.6 km^{2}) (1.01%) is water.

== Demographics ==
Historical population
Census	Pop.	Note	%±
1820	405		—
1830	547		35.1%
1840	826		51.0%
1850	1,175		42.3%
1860	1,616		37.5%
1870	1,946		20.4%
1880	2,481		27.5%
1890	2,868		15.6%
1900	3,426		19.5%
1910	3,455		0.8%
1920	3,247		−6.0%
1930	3,286		1.2%
1940	3,375		2.7%
1950	3,502		3.8%
1960	4,216		20.4%
1970	3,919		−7.0%
1980	4,207		7.3%
1990	4,096		−2.6%
2000	3,913		−4.5%
2010	3,775		−3.5%
2020	3,290		−12.8%
U.S. Decennial Census 2020

=== 2000 ===
At the census of 2000, there were 3,913 people, 1,560 households, and 1,040 families residing in the town. The population density was 41.5 inhabitants per square mile (16.0/km^{2}). There were 2,475 housing units at an average density of 26.2 per square mile (10.1/km^{2}). The racial makeup of the town was 91.31% White, 3.19% African American, 0.05% Native American, 0.89% Asian, 2.71% from other races, and 1.84% from two or more races. Hispanic or Latino of any race were 7.10% of the population.

There were 1,560 households, out of which 29.7% had children under the age of 18 living with them, 50.3% were married couples living together, 11.6% had a female householder with no husband present, and 33.3% were non-families. Of all households 27.8% were made up of individuals, and 12.8% had someone living alone who was 65 years of age or older. The average household size was 2.48 and the average family size was 3.01.

In the town, the population was spread out, with 25.4% under the age of 18, 6.7% from 18 to 24, 24.4% from 25 to 44, 26.1% from 45 to 64, and 17.4% who were 65 years of age or older. The median age was 40 years. For every 100 females, there were 98.4 males. For every 100 females age 18 and over, there were 96.8 males.

The median income for a household in the town was $32,879, and the median income for a family was $38,629. Males had a median income of $33,370 versus $21,094 for females. The per capita income for the town was $16,323. About 11.1% of families and 14.0% of the population were below the poverty line, including 22.0% of those under age 18 and 9.0% of those age 65 or over.

=== 2020 Census and 2023 American Community Survey ===
At the 2020 Census, the population was 3,290 people in a total of 2615 households. The median age is 52.8, nearly 10 years older than that of Sullivan County at 42.2.

The median income for households is $41,776. The employment rate in 2023 was 49.9%, with 16.3% of people living below the poverty line, 29.6% of which are over 65 years old.

== Communities and locations in Rockland ==
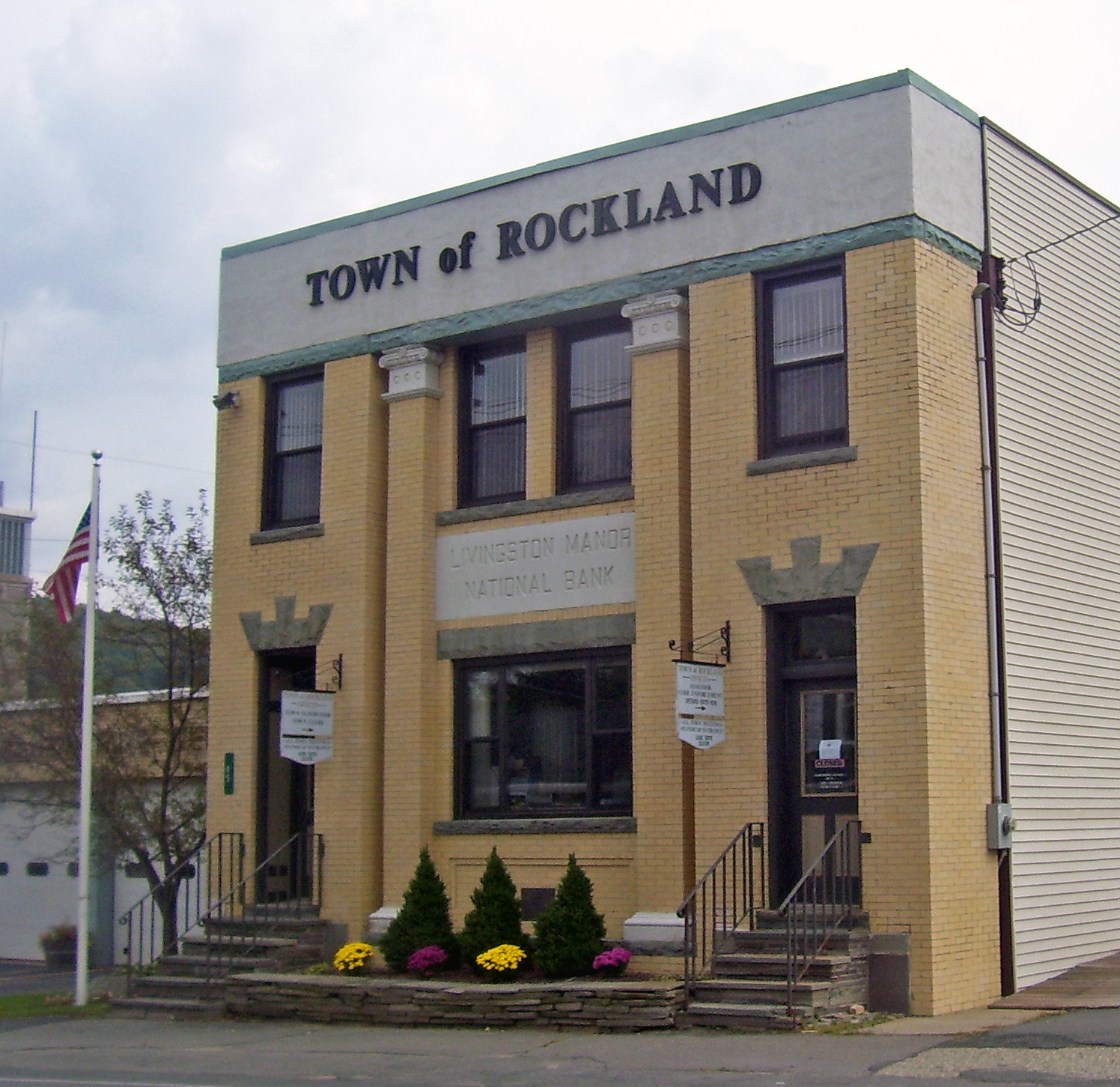
Town Hall, in Livingston Manor

- Anderson: A hamlet near the eastern town line.
- Beaverkill: A hamlet near the northwestern town line. The Beaverkill Bridge was added to the National Register of Historic Places in 2007.
- Craigle Clair: A hamlet in the western part of the town.
- De Bruce: A hamlet five miles east of Livingston Manor; De Bruce, name derived from Land Owner Elias Desbrosses.
- Deckertown: A hamlet north of Livingston Manor.
- Grooville: A hamlet formerly called "Emmonsville." It is in the southeastern part of the town.
- Hazel: A hamlet in the southern part of the town near Route 17.
- Joscelyn: A hamlet in the western part of the town.
- Livingston Manor: A hamlet in the southern part of the town, named after Dr. Edward Livingston.
- Lew Beach: A hamlet at the northernmost corner of the town.
- Morsston: A hamlet near the southern town line.
- Parkston: A hamlet east of Livingston Manor.
- Rockland: The hamlet of Rockland is in the western part of the town, north of Roscoe village. The Rockland Mill Complex was listed on the National Register of Historic Places in 1984.
- Roscoe: A hamlet in the southwestern part of the town. It was formerly known as Westfield Flats.
