= East Branch, New York =

- Hamlet
- Location within New York Location within the United States
- Coordinates: 41°59′18″N 75°08′02″W
- Country: United States
- State: New York
- County: Delaware
- Elevation: 1,007 ft (307 m)
- Time zone: UTC−5 (Eastern (EST))
  - Summer (DST): UTC−4 (EDT)
- ZIP Code: 13756
- Area code: 607
- GNIS feature ID: 948988

East Branch is a hamlet in Delaware County, New York, United States. The community is located at the confluence of the East Branch Delaware River and Beaver Kill and along New York State Route 17, 7.9 miles (12.7 km) east-northeast of Hancock. East Branch has a post office with the ZIP Code 13756.
