= Colchester, New York =

- Town
- Location within New York Location within the United States
- Coordinates: 42°1′45″N 74°57′56″W
- Country: United States
- State: New York
- County: Delaware

Government
  - Type: Town council
  - Town supervisor: Robert Homovich (D)
  - Town council: Members' list: • Gilbert Close (R); • Cindy D'Onofrio (R); • Mark Mattson (R); • Julie Markert (R)

Area
  - Total: 142.17 sq mi (368.23 km^{2})
  - Land: 136.79 sq mi (354.29 km^{2})
  - Water: 5.39 sq mi (13.95 km^{2})
- Elevation: 2,388 ft (728 m)

Population (2020)
  - Total: 1,782
- Time zone: UTC-5 (Eastern (EST))
  - Summer (DST): UTC-4 (EDT)
- ZIP Codes: 13755 (Downsville); 12776 (Roscoe); 13782 (Hamden); 13752 (Delancey)
- Area code: 607
- FIPS code: 36-025-16793
- GNIS feature ID: 0978848
- Website: www.colchesterny.gov

Colchester is a town in Delaware County, New York, United States. The population was 1,782 at the 2020 census. The town is in the southwestern part of the county.

== History ==
Colchester was formed from part of the town of Middletown in 1792. It was named after Colchester, Connecticut.

== Geography ==
The southern town line is the border of Sullivan County.

According to the United States Census Bureau, the town has a total area of 142.2 square miles (368.2 km^{2}), of which 136.8 square miles (354.3 km^{2}) is land and 5.4 square miles (14.0 km^{2}), or 3.80%, is water.

== Demographics ==
Historical population
| Census | Pop. | Note | %± |
|---|---|---|---|
| 1820 | 1,064 | | — |
| 1830 | 1,424 | | 33.8% |
| 1840 | 1,567 | | 10.0% |
| 1850 | 2,184 | | 39.4% |
| 1860 | 2,480 | | 13.6% |
| 1870 | 2,052 | | −17.3% |
| 1880 | 2,941 | | 43.3% |
| 1890 | 2,973 | | 1.1% |
| 1900 | 3,156 | | 6.2% |
| 1910 | 3,193 | | 1.2% |
| 1920 | 2,849 | | −10.8% |
| 1930 | 2,489 | | −12.6% |
| 1940 | 2,092 | | −16.0% |
| 1950 | 2,340 | | 11.9% |
| 1960 | 1,920 | | −17.9% |
| 1970 | 1,665 | | −13.3% |
| 1980 | 1,848 | | 11.0% |
| 1990 | 1,928 | | 4.3% |
| 2000 | 2,042 | | 5.9% |
| 2010 | 2,077 | | 1.7% |
| 2020 | 1,782 | | −14.2% |
U.S. Decennial Census

As of the census of 2000, there were 2,042 people, 837 households, and 547 families residing in the town. The population density was 14.9 inhabitants per square mile (5.8/km^{2}). There were 1,587 housing units at an average density of 11.5 per square mile (4.4/km^{2}). The racial makeup of the town was 98.53% White, 0.34% African American, 0.20% Native American, 0.15% Asian, 0.10% from other races, and 0.69% from two or more races. Hispanic or Latino of any race were 0.78% of the population.

There were 837 households, out of which 24.3% had children under the age of 18 living with them, 54.2% were married couples living together, 7.3% had a female householder with no husband present, and 34.6% were non-families. 29.6% of all households were made up of individuals, and 15.8% had someone living alone who was 65 years of age or older. The average household size was 2.32 and the average family size was 2.86.

In the town, the population was spread out, with 21.0% under the age of 18, 6.1% from 18 to 24, 23.5% from 25 to 44, 26.5% from 45 to 64, and 22.9% who were 65 years of age or older. The median age was 45 years. For every 100 females, there were 93.6 males. For every 100 females age 18 and over, there were 92.9 males.

The median income for a household in the town was $32,147, and the median income for a family was $37,895. Males had a median income of $27,143 versus $20,694 for females. The per capita income for the town was $15,636. About 8.5% of families and 12.7% of the population were below the poverty line, including 22.2% of those under age 18 and 7.8% of those age 65 or over.

== Communities and locations in Colchester ==
- Agloe – A fictional hamlet and copyright trap that served as the inspiration for the 2008 novel Paper Towns
- Butternut Grove – A hamlet located northwest of Cooks Falls.
- Cooks Falls – A hamlet located southeast of Butternut Grove.
- Corbett – A hamlet located north of Horton.
- Downsville – A hamlet and former village in the town.
- Little Spring Brook- A small hamlet on the easternmost side of the town of Colchester, New York, located 5 miles (8 km) north of Roscoe and 5 miles (8 km) south of the Pepacton Reservoir on NYS Route 206. Population is 15 full-time residents and 35 seasonal residents. Little Spring Brook is the gateway to more than 1,000 acres (4.0 km^{2}) of state-owned land and Forest Preserve managed by the New York State Department of Environmental Conservation which is used for seasonal hunting, snowmobiling and hiking.
- Gregorytown – A hamlet located southwest of Corbett.
- Horton – A hamlet located northwest of Butternut Grove.
- Pepacton Reservoir – Part of the New York City Water System.
- Shinhopple – A hamlet located northwest of Horton.

== Notable native ==
- William Elbridge Sewell, governor of Guam, was born here
