= Rusk Mountain =

Mountain in New York, United States

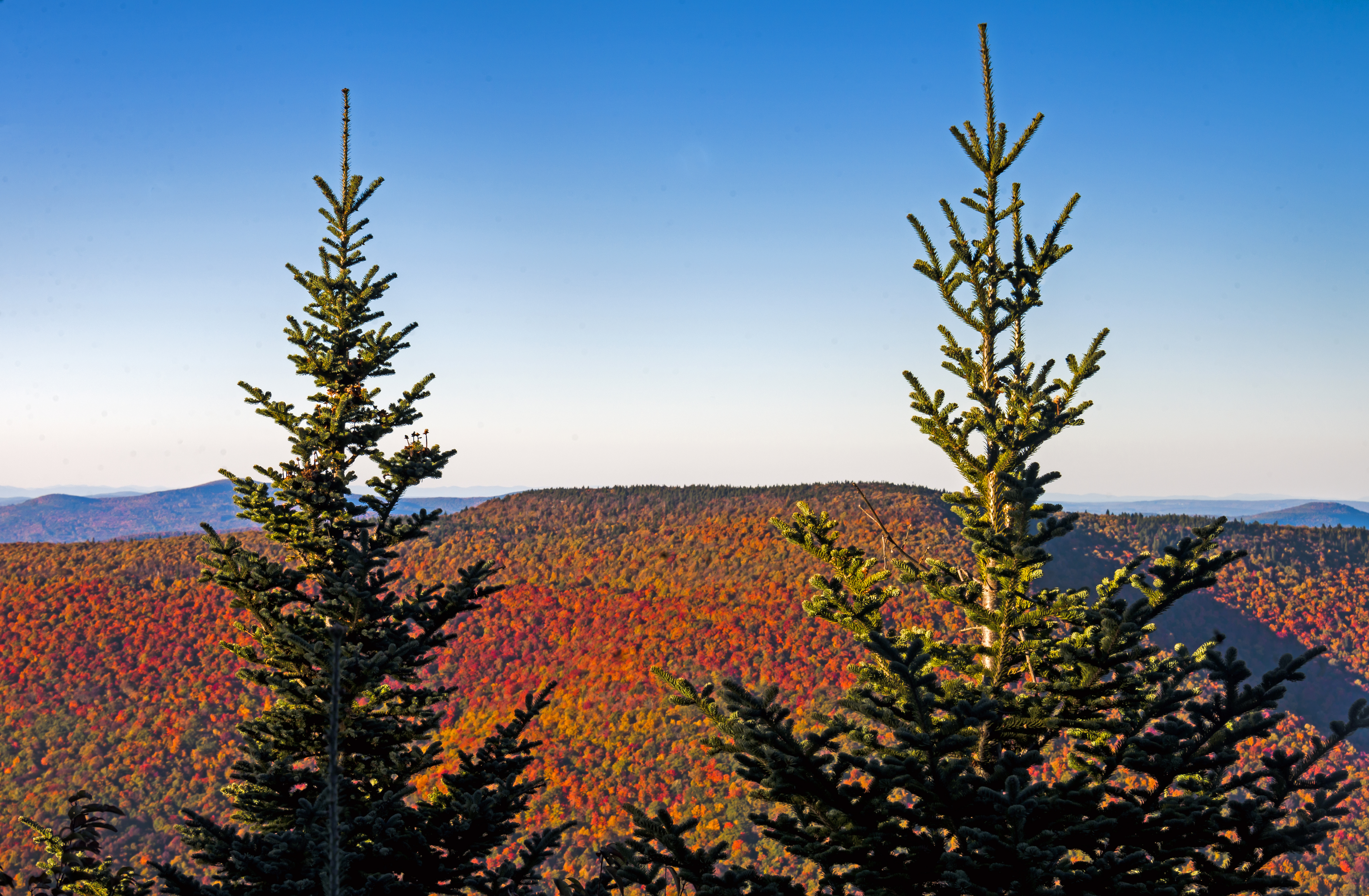
- Rusk in autumn from near the summit of neighboring West Kill Mountain

Highest point
- Elevation: 3,680 feet (1,120 m)
- Prominence: 760 feet (230 m)
- Listing: Catskill High Peaks 21st
- Coordinates: 42°12′02″N 74°16′37″W

Geography
- Location within New York Location within the United States
- Location: Jewett / Lexington, New York, U.S.
- Parent range: Catskills
- Topo map: USGS Lexington

Climbing
- Easiest route: ridge south of Ox Hollow

Rusk Mountain is a peak located in the towns of Jewett and Lexington in Greene County, New York, United States. At 3,680 feet (1,120 m) in elevation, it is the 20th-highest peak in the Catskill Mountains and considered a member of the Catskill High Peaks. While there is no maintained trail, a bushwhack to the summit is considered relatively easy, and required for membership in the Catskill Mountain 3500 Club.

== Geography ==
Rusk is the highest peak (and the only High Peak) on what Catskill forest historian Michael Kudish calls the Lexington Range, the northern of two that fork off from nearby Hunter Mountain, the second-highest Catskill peak. Between Rusk and Taylor Hollow, the col between it and Hunter to its east, there is an unnamed 3,640-foot (1,110 m) summit referred to as East Rusk. The range continues to Evergreen and Packsaddle mountains to the west before ending at Lexington.

The mountain is within the Schoharie Creek watershed. Its southern slopes are drained by an unnamed brook that flows down Ox Hollow into Hunter Brook just above where that stream joins the West Kill, which later drains into the Schoharie. The northern slopes drain directly into the Schoharie headwaters just below them. Its runoff helps feed Schoharie Reservoir, part of the New York City water supply system.

While Rusk is dwarfed from the perspective of the Spruceton Valley by 3,880-foot (1,180 m) West Kill Mountain, it is more impressive due to a greater rise from the valley floor. The north face can be glimpsed in its entirety from NY 296 just north of its junction with NY 23A.

That slope rises up steadily and steeply to the summit ridge. The south is marked by Ox Hollow, and the ridge to its south that is the most frequently used approach when climbing the mountain. The summit ridge leads out to a promontory to the south at the head of the ridge.

Much of the mountain is owned by the state of New York, part of its Forest Preserve, and included in what is currently the Hunter Mountain Wild Forest unit of the Catskill Park. A proposed change, however, would upgrade the lands on Rusk and most of its neighboring peaks into a new unit to be called the Hunter-West Kill wilderness area, while preserving a corridor going up Hunter as the Rusk Mountain Wild Forest (although Rusk would not be a part of that). The only large private landholding on the slopes is to the southwest.

== History ==
Rusk was named by Arnold Henri Guyot after Samuel Rusk, who assisted the Princeton geology professor on what would be the first accurate survey of the Catskills in the 1870s and '80s. There is some evidence, however, that Guyot meant to name what is today East Rusk after Rusk and save Evergreen for today's Rusk, but got confused with his maps.

Guyot made probably what is the first recorded ascent of the mountain during his survey, but it is unknown whether anyone else had come first.

== Natural history ==
According to Kudish, Rusk boasts, in the upper reaches of Ox Hollow, one of the few virgin stands of Eastern Hemlock he has so far identified in the Catskills. This suggests that the barkpeelers of the late 19th century, who deforested large tracts of the region looking for tannin, never got up to this area. The peak was, however, definitely well-explored by the local lumber industry, as skid and wood roads can be found in the woods today, some well above 3,000 feet (910 m) in elevation. The forest below that elevation is thus dominated by the beech and maple trees that are common second-growth in the Catskills.

Above those elevations, those trees persist, albeit in smaller and more stunted forms as elevation increases, until finally they share the summit ridge with the red spruce and balsam fir of the boreal forest found on Catskill summits. Rusk's, however, is more open and passable than some of its neighbors.

== Approaches ==
Land ownership and existing roads in the area have long favored the popular southern approach up the ridge leading up to the summit from Ox Hollow, although easier approaches are theoretically possible. Altogether, there are four routes up the mountain.

=== Ox Hollow ===
Hikers taking this route park at the Spruceton trailhead along Spruceton Road (Greene County Route 7) six miles (9.7 km) east of NY 42 at West Kill. They follow the Spruceton Trail, the old road to the fire tower on Hunter, for roughly 0.5 miles (800 m) until it makes a sharp curve shortly after crossing Hunter Brook.

At that point, an old wood road can be seen intersecting from the southwest. This is followed, making for easy crossings of Hunter's unnamed tributary and the intermittent Ox Hollow drainage brook. A short distance afterward it is at the center of the ridge.

From this point, it is very easy to follow the wide ridge's line straight up to the promontory. A stone wall left over from past attempts to farm this land runs nearly parallel to the route at first, and then it is necessary to either cut across a corner of private property or drop slightly down into the Ox Hollow side to remain on public land. Most hikers choose the former.

The woods here remain fairly open, although stinging nettles flourish here in wetter summers. Above approximately 3,200 feet (980 m), after the last wood road has been crossed and the land belongs to the state once again, the climb becomes more difficult. Not only does the slope becomes steeper and rockier, immature seedlings become denser in the forest understory, making it necessary to gently shove them away and duck underneath or step around them.

Hikers who reach the 3,500-foot (1,100 m) cutoff elevation for High Peak status will find themselves at the base of the shale cliffs around the promontory. This is the crux of the Ox Hollow route. While they are not very sheer and present a number of safe routes to a climber willing to use his or her hands, it can take some time to find one and reach the top. A comparatively easy traverse through the cliffs exists, but is not immediately evident, especially in warmer weather when vegetation limits the view.

Once atop the promontory, the ground is level. Climbers who turn due north at this point, towards the obvious higher ground, invariably find the herd path that leads toward the 3500 Club summit canister. At the point where it climbs up onto the summit cap, there is in all seasons of year an excellent view east and southeast toward Kaaterskill High Peak, Hunter and Southwest Hunter. Next to the top of the short scramble, there is a somewhat limited view across the valley to West Kill's summit nunatak.

Total vertical gain via this route is 1,597 feet (487 m). Approximate distance to the summit from Spruceton Road is 2 miles (3.2 km)

==== Drainage variant ====
A small number of hikers prefer to follow the creek at the bottom of Ox Hollow instead of the ridge and climb the hollow's steep headwall to the summit or the connecting ridge to East Rusk. This requires more effort later on but avoids the cliffs.

=== East from Taylor Hollow ===
When Hunter and Rusk are climbed on the same outing it is common to follow the ridgeline from the Spruceton Trail at Taylor Hollow between the two peaks. This is a gentler rise that also allows for a visit to East Rusk.

=== Southwest ===
Since open land, and driveable roads that run off Rusk Mountain Road, climb a good distance up the mountain in this direction it could, if used, provide a relatively easy hike until just before the promontory. However, this land is privately owned and it would be necessary to get permission to cross it.

=== North face ===
While this slope is on public land, it is also necessary to get permission to cross private property to reach its base. Some hikers have taken this approach, mainly for variety's sake. Total gain via this route would be 2,180 feet (660 m). There is no herd path in this direction. Some hikers report views to the Blackhead Range exist but are not significantly different or better than the many found in more accessible locations.

== Summit ==
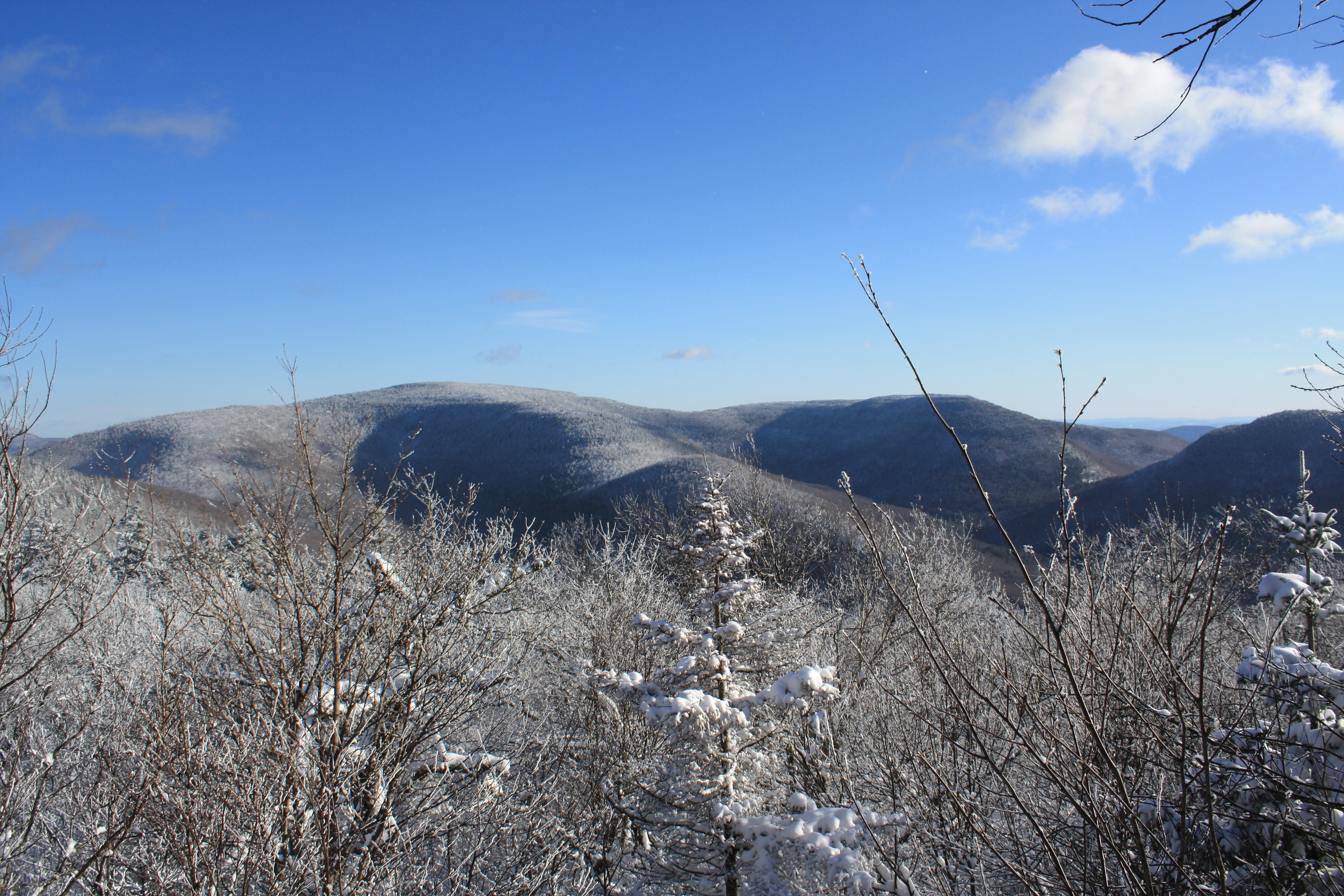
Hunter Mountain from near Rusk's summit, in wintertime

As with many other Catskill peaks, it is difficult to determine where the true high ground on Rusk is as the top is fairly flat. The herd path from the promontory is fairly strong (though some sections near its start can be almost imperceptible in summer when the surrounding ferns grow waist-high) and gets wider and easier to follow as it gets closer to the canister, located near the northwest corner of the summit. There is ample room for a party of hikers to relax and have lunch around it, as many do.

There are few views that equal the viewpoint early on the herd path, though some limited ones to West Kill and its neighbors are available for those who search around in the brush south of the canister, especially if leaves are down.

Anecdotal accounts from GPS readouts on the summit suggest that the mountain may be higher than officially reported.
