= Deep Notch =

Mountain pass in Lexington, New York, United States

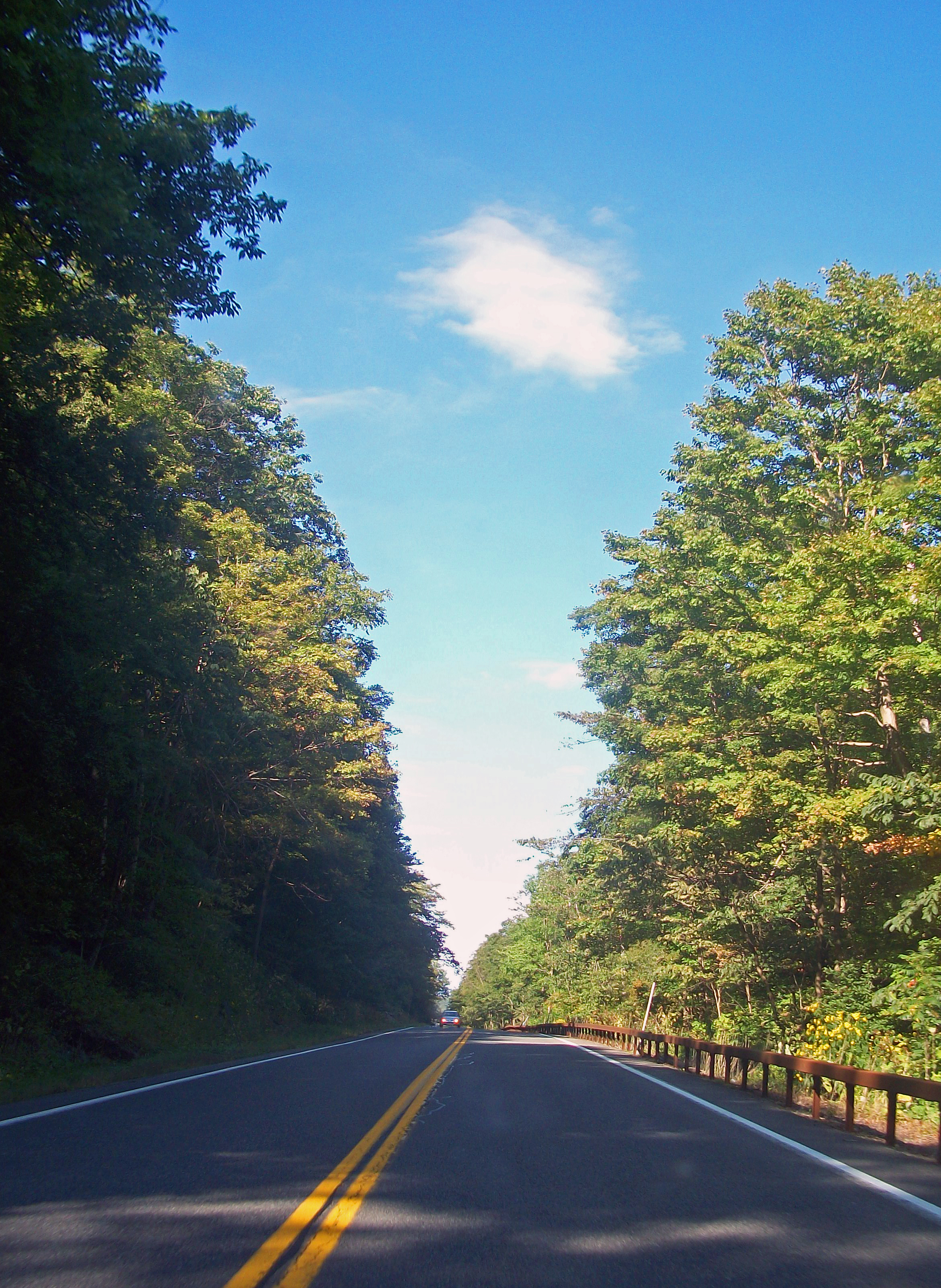
- View north into notch
- Interactive map of Deep Notch
- Elevation: 1,900 feet (580 m)
- Traversed by: NY 42

Third Approach
- Location: Lexington, New York, US
- Range: Catskills
- Coordinates: 42°11′40″N 74°24′20″W

Deep Notch, sometimes West Kill Notch, or Echo Notch, is a mountain pass in Lexington, New York, United States. It divides two Catskill peaks, both subpeaks of high peaks of the range. The narrow groove between the steep, high slopes on either side is traversed by state highway NY 42 and the Shandaken Tunnel, part of the New York City water supply system. It has been called "striking" and "a marvel of grandeur and beauty".

The rocky slopes have required extra fencing at the base to prevent slides from blocking the road, the only paved road from northwestern Ulster County to neighboring towns in Greene County. Their steepness has also made them attractive to ice climbers, a recreational opportunity not widely available elsewhere in the Catskills.

== Geography ==
"Deep Notch" is sometimes used to refer to the entire section of Route 42 from Bushnellville at the county line to West Kill, where the road runs through the narrow valley of Bushnellville Creek between 3,520-foot (1,070 m) Halcott Mountain on the west and 3,540-foot (1,080 m) Mount Sherrill, both High Peaks of the range, to the east. The actual notch is the roughly 1.5-mile (2.4 km) section north of the upper tributary of the creek to West Kill. On the west is an unnamed 3,408-foot (1,039 m) peak known as Northeast Halcott or Sleeping Lion; to the west is a 3,280-foot (1,000 m) false summit of Balsam Mountain, itself a subpeak of Sherrill.

The two generally level summits are separated by roughly one mile (1.6 km). Between them, the road crests at 1,900 feet (580 m) in the notch. On the west, that leaves a slope that rises 1,400 feet (430 m) to where it levels off below the summit of Northeast Halcott in 2,000 horizontal feet (610 m), complemented by a 1,300-foot (400 m) rise over a similar distance on the east. The grades are 70 percent and 65 percent respectively.

Both slopes are property of the state of New York, managed by the Department of Environmental Conservation as part of the Catskill Park Forest Preserve. The western land is in the Halcott Mountain Wild Forest and the eastern property in the West Kill Wilderness Area. As part of the Forest Preserve they remain forever wild, in accordance with the state constitution. There is little development in the area save some houses along the road to the south.

South of the notch the land rises gently but steadily into it, gaining about 450 feet (140 m) over two miles (3.2 km) from Bushnellville. To the north it descends more rapidly to the hamlet of West Kill. The highway drops 525 feet (160 m) in a half-mile (1 km) to the junction with Greene County Route 6.

Route 42 is one of only three paved roads crossing gaps in a long chain of ranges that extends from Plattekill Mountain in the east to Utsayantha Mountain, near Stamford, in the west. It allows residents of the areas of Ulster and Delaware counties to the south and southwest, such as Pine Hill, Fleischmanns and Margaretville, to get to places like Prattsville and Windham to the north without having to go a long distance out of their way. In addition, it is the most common route to the rest of Greene County for residents of the Town of Halcott to the west, isolated from the rest of the county by mountains along its eastern and northern border.

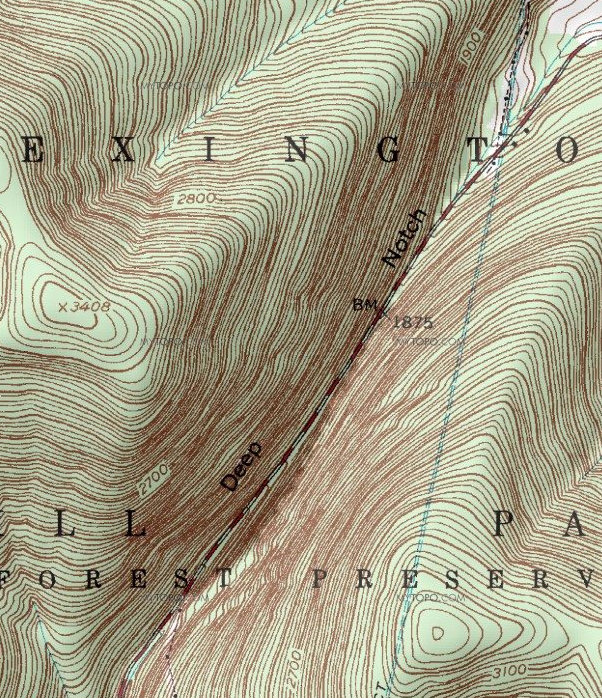
Topographic map of Deep Notch

All of Deep Notch is within the Hudson River watershed. Bushnellville Creek drains into Esopus Creek to the south, and the north side feeds the West Kill, a Schoharie Creek tributary. The Schoharie's waters ultimately reach the Hudson via a circuitous route ending with the Mohawk River.

== History ==
The Catskills as a whole were formed during the Devonian period, 250–350 million years ago, when the former delta of a river that drained the Taconic and Acadian mountain ranges to the northeast lifted up as one. Erosion dissected the resulting plateau into mountains. The sandstones and shales left from the river deposits make up the notch's rock outcrops and deposits.

Like Stony Clove Notch to the east, Deep Notch was formed more recently, at the end of the last Ice Age. Waters from the glacial lake of meltwater that covered the Schoharie headlands eventually spilled over the gap between the peaks, opening up the valley to the south. Eventually, it carved out the notch and then the water drained away.

Due to its steep slopes, the notch largely avoided any of the exploitation that characterized Catskill forests prior to the establishment of the Forest Preserve in 1885. In the late 1820s the Greene and Delaware Turnpike was built through the notch, connecting the large tannery at Hunter with Middletown in Delaware County. In addition to the entire northern segment of Route 42 from Shandaken to Lexington, this route is today followed by corresponding portions of routes 23A and 28 at the north and south respectively.

Catskill forest historian Michael Kudish has found evidence of some disturbance on the east slope. That side is mostly second-growth forest to about 2,950–3,000 feet (900–910 m). Above that first-growth resumes. Within that lower area he reported that charcoal was abundant in the soil and northern red oak in the forest, suggesting a past fire there. He believes it occurred around 1894.

In the late 1910s the notch area was slightly disturbed when New York City began building the Shandaken Tunnel, allowing water from Schoharie Reservoir to flow 18 miles (29 km) underground to the Esopus near Shandaken, where it would eventually reach Ashokan Reservoir. It followed the road through the notch, and its air vents and a cleared right-of-way can be seen where it crosses Route 42 north of the notch. Under the slopes of Balsam Mountain just east of Deep Notch, it reaches its greatest depth below the surface, 2,215 feet (675 m).

== Recreation ==
The steep pitch of the slopes has made Deep Notch attractive to ice climbers, who have mapped out several ice routes along the seeps of wintertime. They are generally rated as WI2–3 on the ice grading system, which puts them among the easier ice climbs. It is one of the few climbing areas in the Catskills, a range whose sedimentary bedrock makes its cliffs generally unsuitable for rock climbing, and one of the only ice climbing areas within a reasonable day's drive of New York City.
