= Bennett Brook (West Kill tributary) =

- Location of the mouth of Bennett Brook

Location
- Country: United States
- State: New York
- County: Greene

Physical characteristics
- Source
  - coordinates: 42°10′49″N 74°21′46″W
- Mouth: West Kill
  - location: West Kill, New York, United States
  - coordinates: 42°11′48″N 74°21′40″W
  - elevation: 1,591 ft (485 m)
- Basin size: .99 sq mi (2.6 km^{2})

Bennett Brook is a river in Greene County, New York. It converges with West Kill east of the hamlet of West Kill, New York. Bennett Brook drains the northwestern slopes of North Dome and the northeastern slopes of Mount Sherrill.
