= Beech Ridge Brook =

Location
- Country: United States
- State: New York

Physical characteristics
- Mouth: West Kill
  - location: West Kill, New York, United States
  - coordinates: 42°13′52″N 74°23′38″W
- Basin size: 1.62 mi^{2} (4.2 km^{2})

Beech Ridge Brook converges with West Kill near West Kill, New York.
