= Newton Brook (West Kill tributary) =

Location
- Country: United States
- State: New York

Physical characteristics
- Mouth: West Kill
  - location: West Kill, New York, United States
  - coordinates: 42°12′01″N 74°22′12″W
- Basin size: .47 mi^{2} (1.2 km^{2})

Newton Brook converges with West Kill near West Kill, New York.
