= Vly Mountain =

Mountain in New York, United States

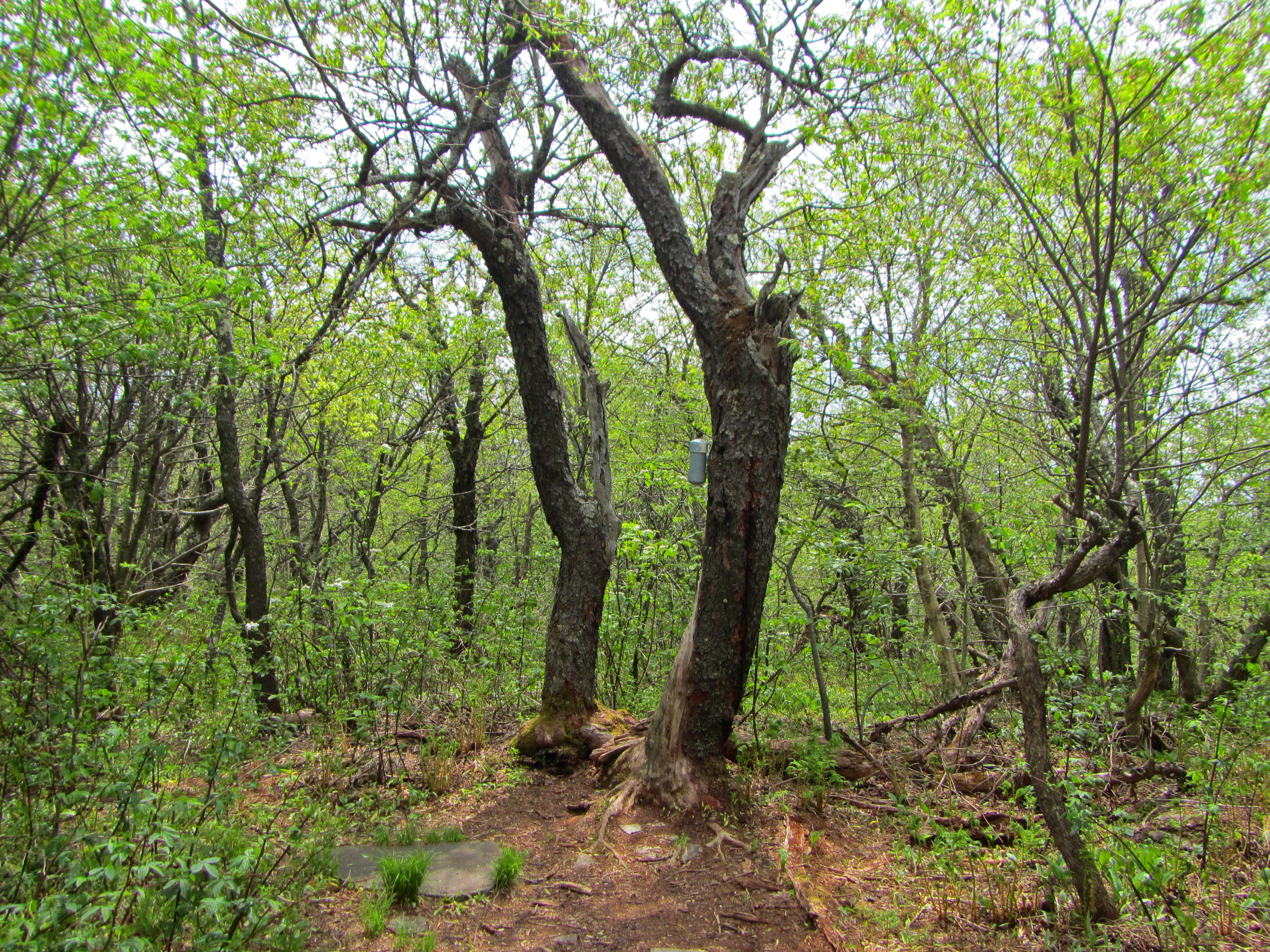
- Summit, with canister attached to tree

Highest point
- Elevation: 3,529 ft (1,076 m) NGVD 29
- Prominence: 649 ft (198 m)
- Listing: Catskill High Peaks 33rd
- Coordinates: 42°14.75′N 74°26.90′W

Geography
- Location within New York Location within the United States
- Location: Halcott, Greene County, New York
- Parent range: Catskill Mountains
- Topo map: USGS West Kill

Vly Mountain is a mountain located in the town of Halcott, New York, United States in Greene County. The mountain is part of the Catskill Mountains. Vly Mountain is flanked to the northwest by Bearpen Mountain, to the east by Vinegar Hill, to the northeast by Kipp Hill, and to the southeast by Beech Ridge.

The north side of Vly Mountain drains into Little West Kill, thence into Schoharie Creek, the Mohawk River, the Hudson River, and into New York Bay. The east side of Vly Mtn. drains through Roarback Brook into the West Kill, thence into Schoharie Creek. The south and west sides of Vly Mountain drain into Vly Creek, thence into Bush Kill, Dry Brook, the East Branch of the Delaware River, and into Delaware Bay. Near the bottom of the trail from the hunters cabin there are some old cars left in the woods. Keep watch they are in an overgrown area

== See also ==
- List of mountains in New York
