= Schoolhouse Brook =

Location
- Country: United States
- State: New York

Physical characteristics
- Mouth: West Kill
  - location: West Kill, New York, United States
  - coordinates: 42°11′56″N 74°21′18″W
- Basin size: .73 mi^{2} (1.9 km^{2})

Schoolhouse Brook converges with West Kill by West Kill, New York.
