= Evergreen Mountain =

Mountain in New York, United States

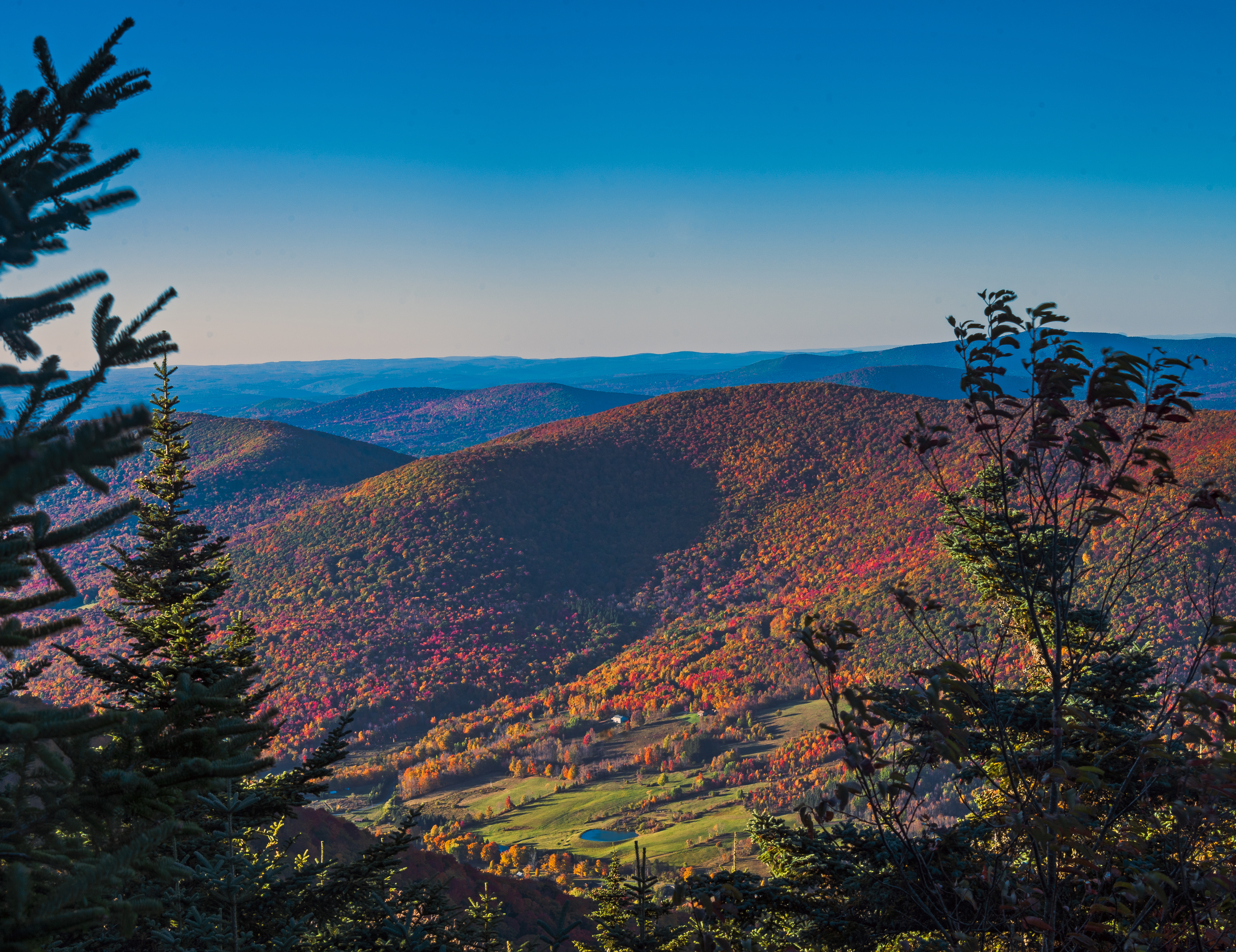
- View of Evergreen Mountain from Buck Ridge Lookout in Autumn of 2016.

Highest point
- Elevation: 3,369 ft (1,027 m)
- Coordinates: 42°12′42″N 74°18′29″W

Geography
- Location within New York Location within the United States
- Location: N of Spruceton, New York, U.S.
- Topo map: USGS Lexington

Evergreen Mountain is a mountain located in Greene County, New York north of Spruceton, New York. Herdman Brook drains the southeastern portion of the mountain and flows south before converging with West Kill. West Kill flows westwards, south of Evergreen Mountain and the Schoharie Creek flows eastwards, north of the mountain.
