= Halcott Grange No. 881 =

- U.S. National Register of Historic Places
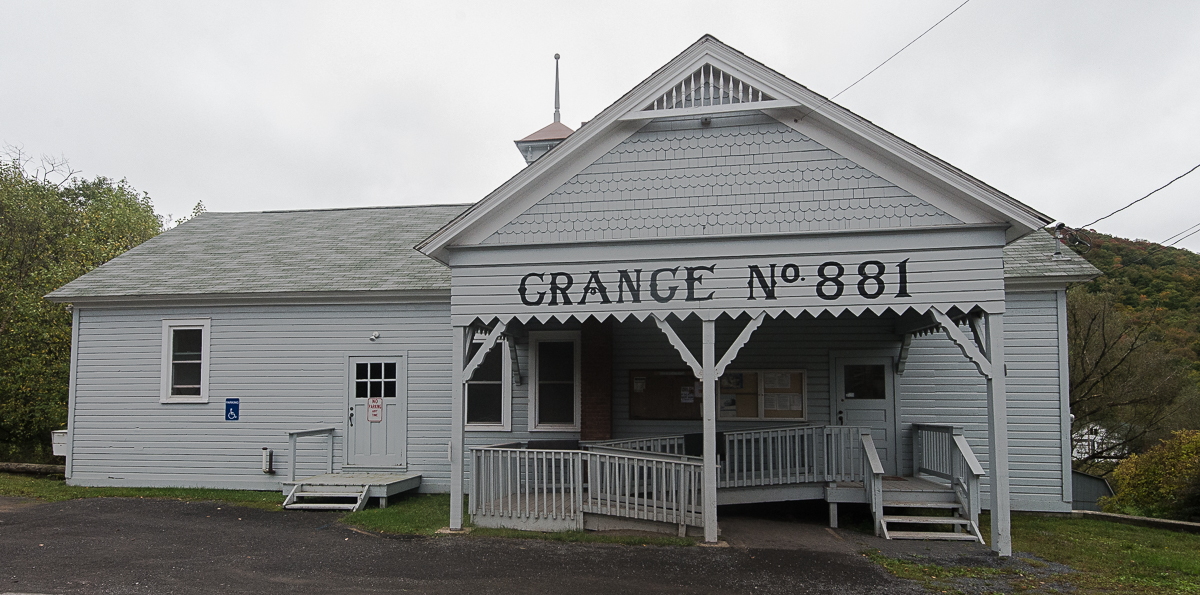
- East (front) elevation, 2016

- Location within New York Location within the United States
- Location: Cty Rte. 3, Halcott, New York
- Coordinates: 42°11′27″N 74°29′10″W
- Area: less than one acre
- Built: 1889
- Architectural style: Queen Anne
- NRHP reference No.: 00000351
- Added to NRHP: April 6, 2000

Halcott Grange No. 881, also known as Green Valley Grange, is a historic Grange building located at Halcott in Greene County, New York. It was built in 1889 and is a 1 1/2-story, rectangular gable-roofed structure. It features a prominent portico and cupola with Italianate brackets. It was originally built as a creamery and converted for use as a Grange after 1914.

It was listed on the National Register of Historic Places in 2000. The Halcott Town Board holds its meetings there, making it the town hall for practical purposes.
