= Styles Brook =

- Location of the mouth of Styles Brook within New York

Location
- Country: United States
- State: New York

Physical characteristics
- Mouth: West Kill
  - location: Spruceton, New York, United States
  - coordinates: 42°11′32″N 74°18′35″W
- Basin size: 1.48 sq mi (3.8 km^{2})

Styles Brook converges with West Kill by Spruceton, New York.
