= Roarback Brook =

- Location of the mouth of Roarback Brook Roarback Brook (the United States)

Location
- Country: United States
- State: New York
- Region: Greene County

Physical characteristics
- Source
  - coordinates: 42°14′38″N 74°25′49″W
- Mouth: West Kill
  - location: WSW of Lexington, New York, United States
  - coordinates: 42°14′06″N 74°23′21″W
  - elevation: 1,362 ft (415 m)

Roarback Brook begins on the eastern side of Vly Mountain and travels east, passing to the south of Vinegar Hill before converging with West Kill west-southwest of Lexington, New York.
