= Pettit Brook =

Location
- Country: United States
- State: New York

Physical characteristics
- Mouth: West Kill
  - location: Spruceton, New York, United States
  - coordinates: 42°11′06″N 74°16′45″W
- Basin size: .30 mi^{2} (0.78 km^{2})

Pettit Brook is a river that converges with West Kill east of Spruceton, New York.
