= Hagadone Brook =

Location
- Country: United States
- State: New York

Physical characteristics
- Source: North slope of North Dome
  - coordinates: 42°10′57″N 74°20′54″W
- Mouth: West Kill
  - location: Spruceton, New York, United States
  - coordinates: 42°11′51″N 74°20′46″W
  - elevation: 1,686 ft (514 m)
- Basin size: .64 mi^{2} (1.7 km^{2})

Hagadone Brook converges with West Kill west of Spruceton, New York. Hagadone Brook drains the northern slopes of North Dome.
