= Diamond Notch Falls =

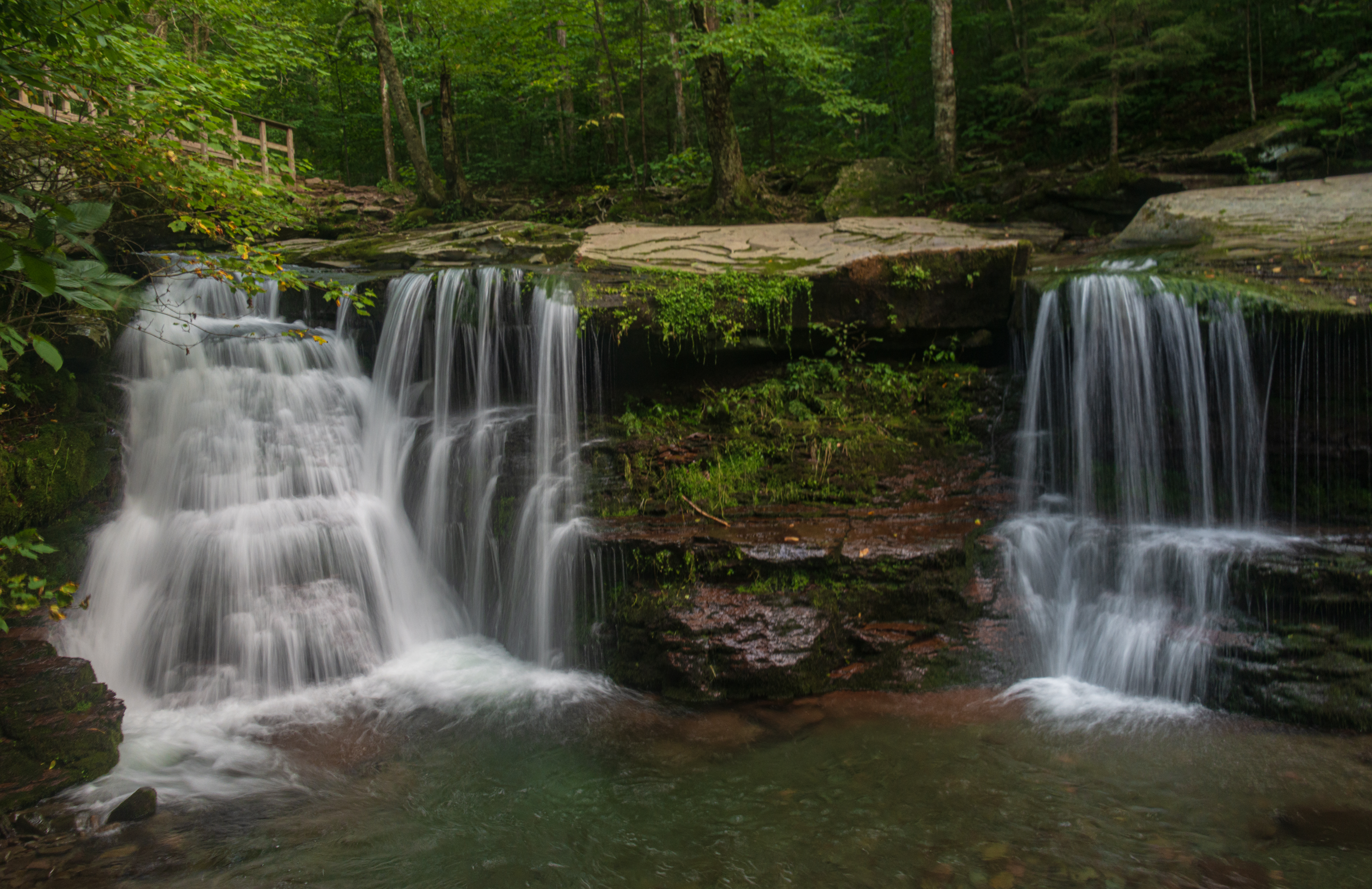
- Diamond Notch Falls on the upper West Kill

- Location within New York
- Location: Lexington, NY, US
- Coordinates: 42.176926°N 74.260658°W
- Elevation: 2,240 ft (680 m)
- Total height: 15 feet (4.6 m)
- Watercourse: West Kill

Diamond Notch Falls is a waterfall located on the West Kill, east of Spruceton in the Hunter-West Kill Wilderness in Greene County, New York. Diamond Notch Falls is a side by side waterfall, both being about 15 feet (4.6 m) in height.

The Diamond Notch Trail passes Diamond Notch Falls. The trail begins at Spruceton Road and travels south through Diamond Notch, and descends down to connect with Diamond Notch Road, north of Lanesville. At 1 mile from Sprucetown Road, the trail passes Diamond Notch Falls and then the intersection with the Devil's Path. Then at 2.2 miles, the trail passes the Diamond Notch wind gap.
