= Hunter Brook =

Location
- Country: United States
- State: New York

Physical characteristics
- Mouth: West Kill
  - location: Spruceton, New York, United States
  - coordinates: 42°11′03″N 74°16′31″W
- Basin size: 1.95 mi^{2} (5.1 km^{2})

Hunter Brook is a brook that converges with West Kill east of Spruceton, New York, USA.
