= Herdman Brook =

Location
- Country: United States
- State: New York

Physical characteristics
- Mouth: West Kill
  - location: Spruceton, New York, United States
  - coordinates: 42°11′32″N 74°18′33″W
- Basin size: .75 mi^{2} (1.9 km^{2})

Herdman Brook converges with West Kill by Spruceton, New York.
