= North Dome (New York) =

Mountain in the United States

- Location within New York Location within the United States

Highest point
- Elevation: 3,610 ft (1,100 m)
- Prominence: 1,160 ft (350 m)
- Listing: Catskill High Peaks 26th
- Coordinates: 42°10.43′N 74°20.93′W

Geography
- Location: Greene County, New York
- Parent range: Catskill Mountains
- Topo map: USGS Lexington

North Dome is a mountain located in Greene County, New York. The mountain is part of the Catskill Mountains. North Dome is flanked to the east by West Kill Mountain, and to the west faces Mount Sherrill.

North Dome stands within the watershed of the Hudson River, which drains into New York Bay. The northern slopes of North Dome drain into the West Kill via Hagadone Brook and Bennett Brook, thence into Schoharie Creek, the Mohawk River, and the Hudson River. The southern slopes of North Dome drain into Esopus Creek, and thence into the Hudson River.

North Dome is contained within the Westkill Mountain Wilderness Area of New York's Catskill State Park. There is no hiking trail over the mountain, though an extension of the Devil's Path west from West Kill Mtn. has been contemplated. The ascent is made by bushwack, most often from Spruceton Road.

== See also ==
- List of mountains in New York
