= Halcott, New York =

- Town
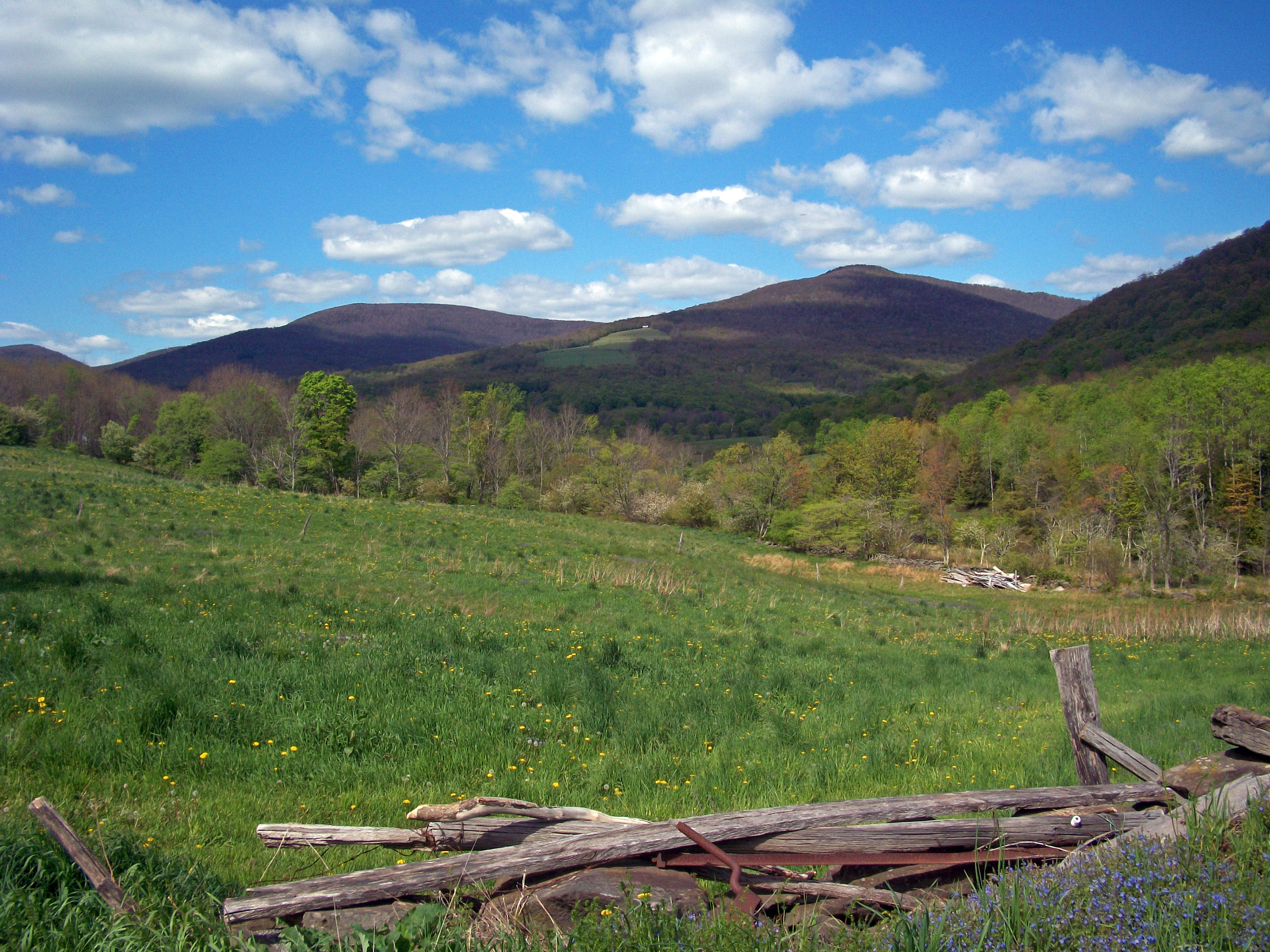
- Vly and South Vly mountains from the center of town
- Etymology: Early settler
- Location in Greene County and the state of New York.

- Location of New York in the United States
- Coordinates: 42°11′26″N 74°29′9″W
- Country: United States
- State: New York
- County: Greene
- Founded: 1851

Government
  - Type: Town Hall
  - Mayor: A. Innes Kasanof (D, R)

Area
  - Total: 23.04 sq mi (59.68 km^{2})
  - Land: 23.04 sq mi (59.68 km^{2})
  - Water: 0 sq mi (0.00 km^{2})
- Elevation: 1,760 ft (540 m)
- Highest elevation (Bearpen Mountain): 3,600 ft (1,100 m)
- Lowest elevation (Vly Creek at Delaware County line): 1,700 ft (520 m)

Population (2020)
  - Total: 249
- Time zone: UTC-5 (Eastern (EST))
  - Summer (DST): UTC-4 (Eastern Daylight Time)
- ZIP Code: 12430 (Halcott Center)
- Area code: 845
- FIPS code: 36-039-31379
- FIPS code: 36-31379
- GNIS feature ID: 0979034
- Website: www.townofhalcott.org

Halcott is a town in Greene County, New York, United States. The population was 249 in 2020, down from 258 at the 2010 census. The town is in the southwestern corner of the county.

== History ==
The first recorded settlers, the Valkenburg family, arrived around 1813, although some non-permanent settlers had attempted to live in the area about 1790. The town was established in 1851 from the town of Lexington. It was named for sheriff George W. Halcott.

In 1900, the town population was 272.

== Geography ==
According to the United States Census Bureau, the town has a total area of 23.0 square miles (60 km^{2}), all land.

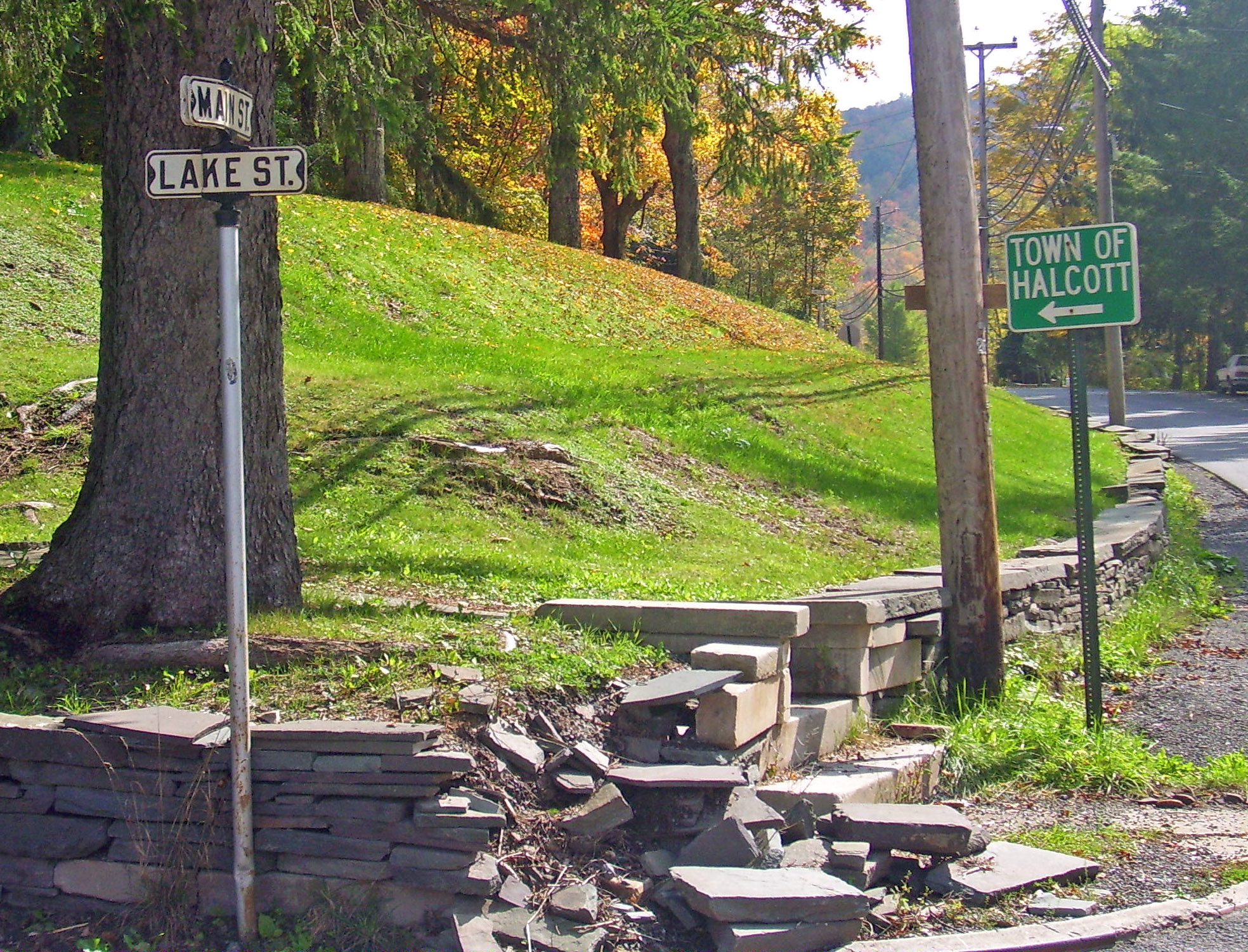
Sign pointing to Halcott in the Delaware County village of Fleischmanns to the south

Halcott is in the Catskill Mountains. The western and southern town lines are the border of Delaware County. The northern and eastern borders are the range of mountains from Bearpen Mountain to Halcott Mountain, beyond which lies the neighboring town of Lexington. The town of Halcott is basically the valley of Vly Creek, and ringed by mountains on three sides. Most access to the town is from the south, via the Delaware County village of Fleischmanns.

The pass between Bearpen and neighboring Vly Mountain is traversed by Halcott Mountain Road, an unimproved county highway which reaches 2,800 feet (850 m) at the col, making it the highest elevation free public through road in New York State. It is also the only route between Halcott and the rest of Greene County. Like Hardenburgh in nearby Ulster County, to reach the rest of the county via a paved road one must leave and go through a portion of either Ulster or Delaware counties.

Due to this geographic isolation, Halcott is the only place in Greene County whose telephones are in the 845 area code.

== Demographics ==
Historical population
Census	Pop.	Note	%±
1860	504		—
1870	426		−15.5%
1880	396		−7.0%
1890	357		−9.8%
1900	350		−2.0%
1910	331		−5.4%
1920	272		−17.8%
1930	223		−18.0%
1940	273		22.4%
1950	244		−10.6%
1960	193		−20.9%
1970	199		3.1%
1980	150		−24.6%
1990	189		26.0%
2000	193		2.1%
2010	258		33.7%
2020	249		−3.5%
U.S. Decennial Census

At the 2000 census, there were 193 people, 84 households and 54 families residing in the town. The population density was 8.4 inhabitants per square mile (3.2/km^{2}). There were 288 housing units at an average density of 12.5 per square mile (4.8/km^{2}). The racial makeup of the town was 98.45% White, and 1.55% from two or more races. Hispanic or Latino of any race were 1.04% of the population.

There were 84 households, of which 20.2% had children under the age of 18 living with them, 52.4% were married couples living together, 7.1% had a female householder with no husband present, and 35.7% were non-families. 28.6% of all households were made up of individuals, and 11.9% had someone living alone who was 65 years of age or older. The average household size was 2.30 and the average family size was 2.70.

Age distribution was 18.7% under the age of 18, 4.7% from 18 to 24, 25.9% from 25 to 44, 29.0% from 45 to 64, and 21.8% who were 65 years of age or older. The median age was 45 years. For every 100 females, there were 96.9 males. For every 100 females age 18 and over, there were 109.3 males.

The median household income was $31,094, and the median family income was $40,000. Males had a median income of $31,250 versus $20,417 for females. The per capita income for the town was $21,627. About 14.5% of families and 20.8% of the population were below the poverty line, including 31.6% of those under the age of eighteen and 11.4% of those 65 or over.

== Communities and locations in Halcott ==
- Halcott Center – A hamlet near the southern town line, in Greene County. This is the only named community in the town, and the locale to which most mail is addressed. The town's post office was located in this area until 1985, when its 12437 ZIP code was retired and mail service was merged with the 12430 post office in neighboring Fleischmanns located in Delaware County. The hamlet of Halcottsville is to the west, also in Delaware County.
- Halcott Mountain – A mountain east of the town in the Catskill Park. It is one of the Catskill High Peaks. The summit and much of the mountain are actually in Lexington.
- Vly Creek – A stream that flows southward past Halcott Center. The town is its basin.
- Vly Mountain – A mountain along the northeastern town line, also one of the Catskill High Peaks.
- Bearpen Mountain – Another of the Catskill High Peaks, with a summit of 3,600 feet (1,100 m).
