= Summit register =

Record of visitors to a mountain's summit

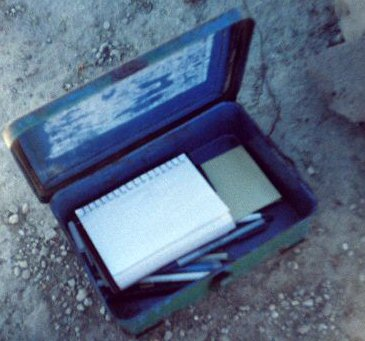
Summit book on White Butte, the highpoint of North Dakota

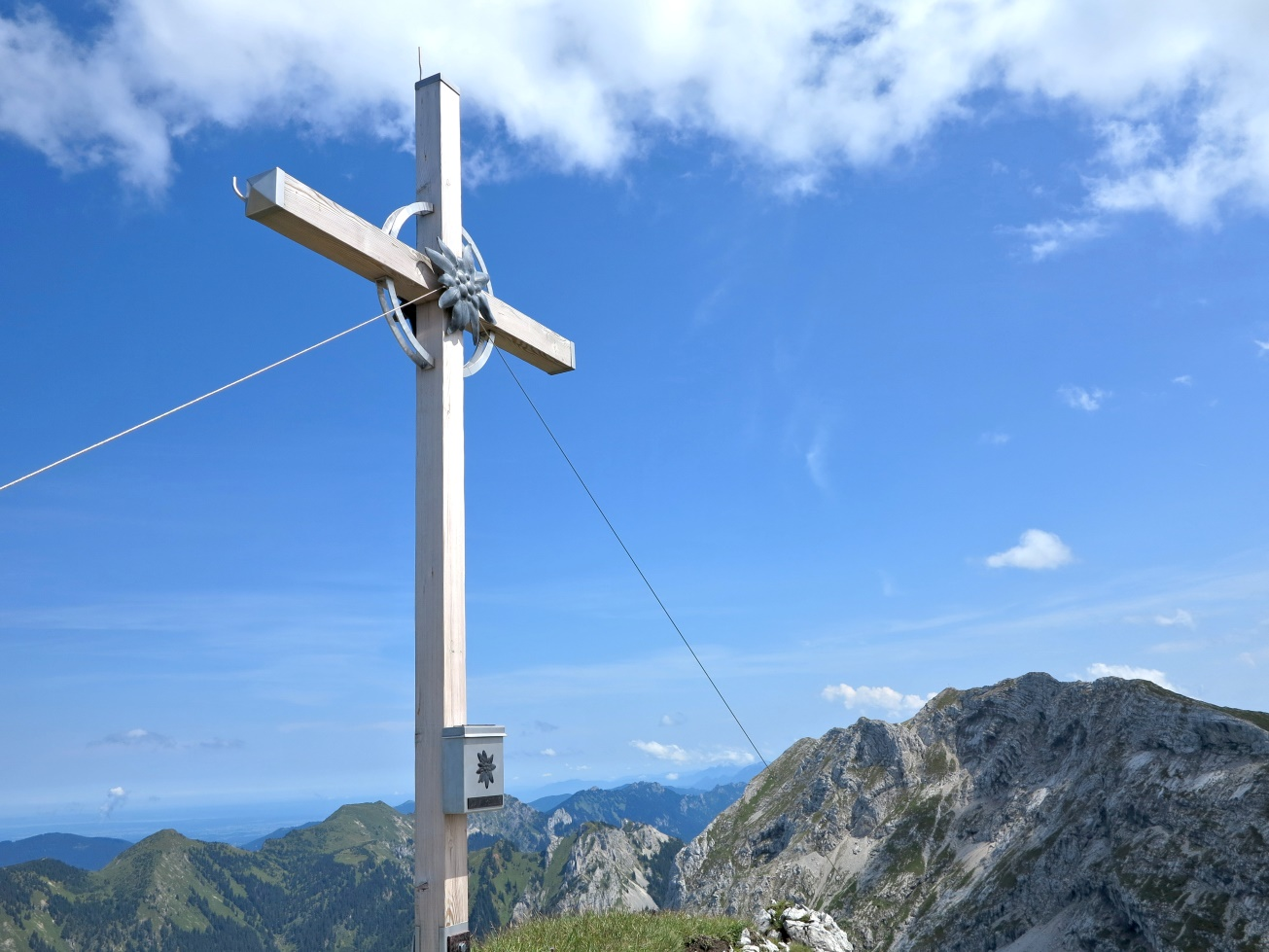
A summit cross in Austria with an attached container at the bottom for the summit book.

A summit book or summit register is a record of visitors to the summit of a mountain. It is usually enclosed in a weatherproof, animal-proof metal casing. Some books are maintained in an informal manner by an individual or small group, while others are maintained by a club. Well-known and often-climbed peaks, such as those on peak bagging lists, are more likely to have summit books. On the other hand, mountains which are very heavily climbed or have popular trails up, such as Mount Whitney or Ben Nevis, may not have registers, or may have a daily logbook that is changed out often.

The Sierra Club places official registers on many mountains throughout California and the United States, typically small notebooks put inside large, metal boxes. When the registers are filled up, these are collected and stored in the Bancroft Library in Berkeley, California where they are available for viewing.

Entries in a summit book vary in format, from a simple note of a person's name and date of the climb, to notes about the scenery, or long essays about the events of the climb. Some summit books contain a record of climbs going back many years. On infrequently climbed peaks, this record may exist in one volume at the peak itself, while more popular peaks have well-maintained registers spread across many volumes, with all except the current one with a keeper or the club.

== Bibliography ==
- Òscar Masó García: Libros de cima. A History of Passion and Conquest. Madrid 2018, Desnivel Editions, ISBN 9788498294200
