= Mount Sherrill =

Mountain in the United States

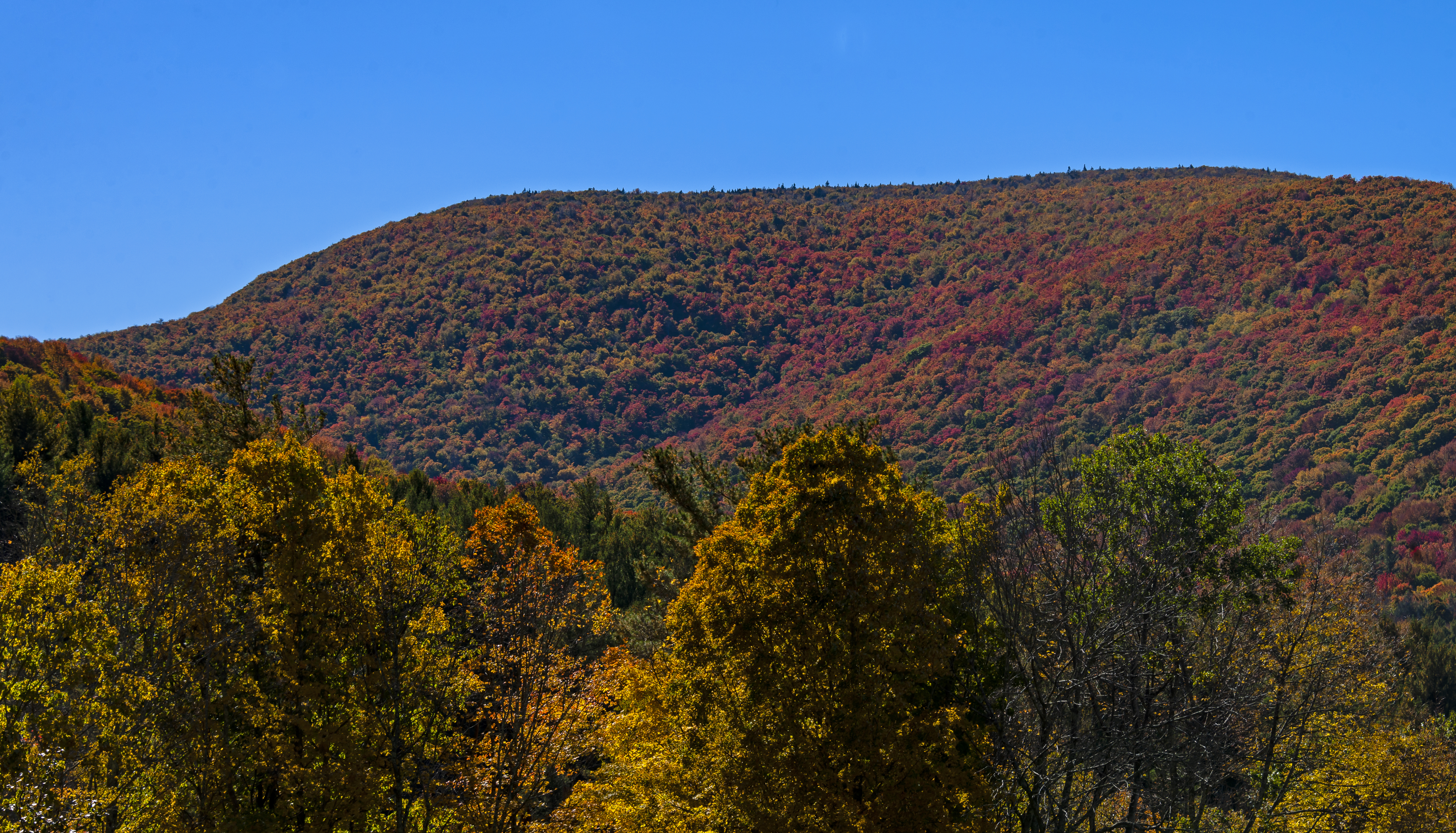
- Sherrill from Spruceton Road east of West Kill

Highest point
- Elevation: 3,550 ft (1,080 m)
- Prominence: 540 ft (160 m)
- Listing: Catskill High Peaks 31st
- Coordinates: 42°10′32″N 74°22′23″W

Geography
- Location within New York Location within the United States
- Location: Hunter-West Kill Wilderness, Catskill Forest Preserve, Greene County, New York
- Parent range: Central Catskills
- Topo map: USGS Lexington

Climbing
- Easiest route: Hike

Mount Sherrill is a mountain located in Greene County, New York, and is named after Eliakim Sherrill, and is part of the Catskill Mountains. Mount Sherrill is flanked to the east by North Dome, and to the west by Balsam Mountain.

Mount Sherrill stands within the watershed of the Hudson River, which drains into New York Bay. The northern slopes of Mt. Sherrill drain via Bennett Brook and Newton Brook into the West Kill, then into Schoharie Creek, the Mohawk River, and, finally, the Hudson River. The west side of Mt. Sherrill drains into Bushnellsville Creek, thence into Esopus Creek, and the Hudson River. The southeast side of Mt. Sherrill drains through Peck Hollow into Esopus Creek.

Mount Sherrill is contained within the Westkill Mountain Wilderness Area of New York's Catskill State Park. There is no hiking trail over the mountain, although an extension of the Devil's Path west from West Kill Mtn. has been contemplated. An old bus is located near 3200 ft but the location is very difficult to find.

== See also ==
- Catskill High Peaks
- List of mountains in New York
