= West Kill, New York =

- Hamlet and CDP
- Location within New York Location within the United States
- Coordinates: 42°12′30″N 74°23′12″W
- Country: United States
- State: New York
- County: Greene
- Town: Lexington

Area
  - Total: 1.23 sq mi (3.18 km^{2})
- Elevation: 1,470 ft (450 m)
- Time zone: UTC-5 (Eastern (EST))
  - Summer (DST): UTC-4 (EDT)
- ZIP code: 12492
- Area code: 518
- GNIS feature ID: 970772

West Kill is a hamlet (and census-designated place) in the town of Lexington, Greene County, New York, United States. West Kill flows through the hamlet. The ZIP Code is 12492.

As of the 2020 census, West Kill had a population of 121.
