= Fallsburg, New York =

- Town
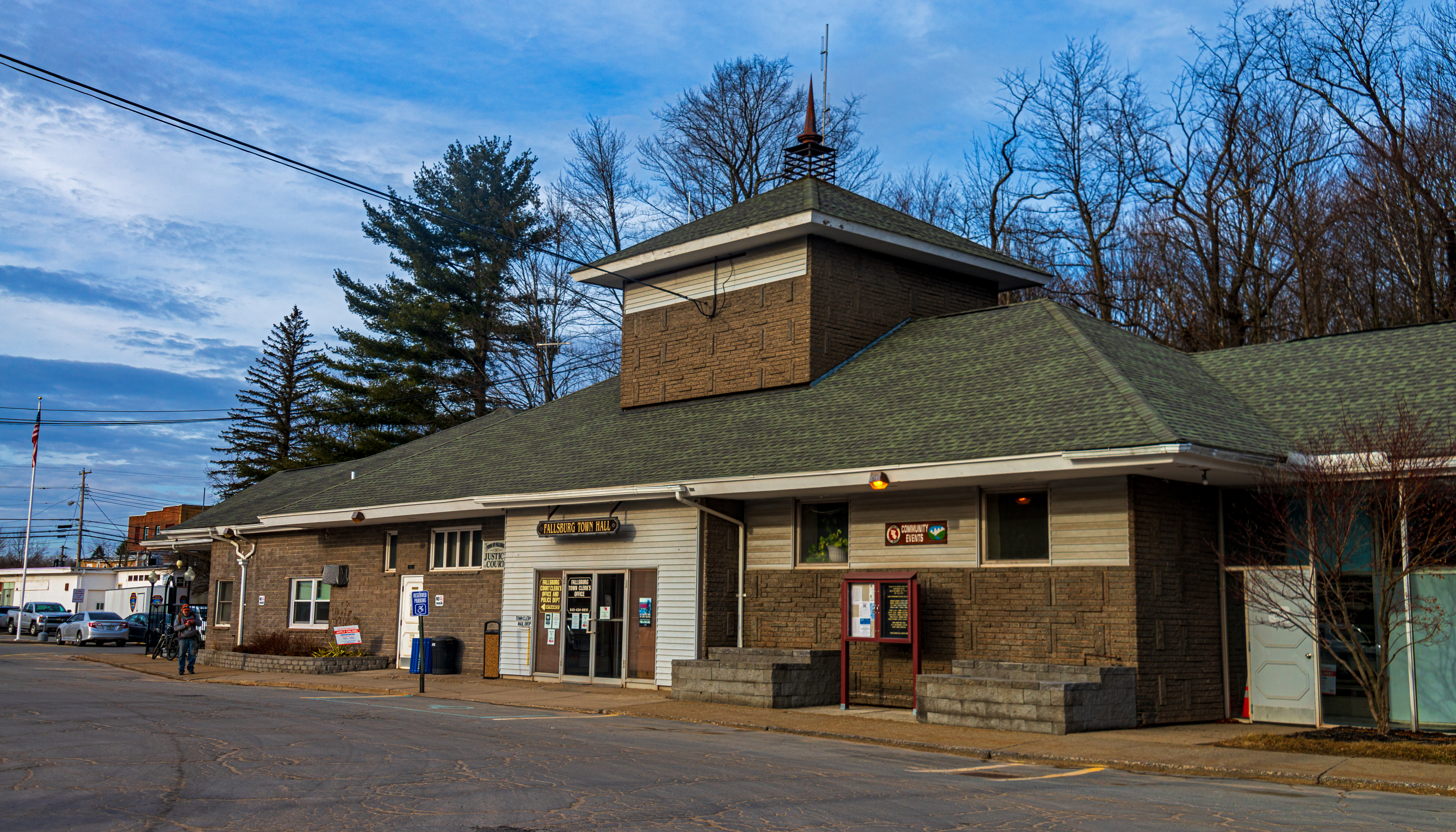
- Town hall

- Location within Sullivan County, New York
- Coordinates: 41°44′N 74°36′W
- Country: United States
- State: New York
- County: Sullivan

Area
  - Total: 79.11 sq mi (204.89 km^{2})
  - Land: 77.62 sq mi (201.04 km^{2})
  - Water: 1.49 sq mi (3.86 km^{2})
- Elevation: 1,168 ft (356 m)

Population (2020)
  - Total: 14,192
- Demonym: Fallsburger
- Time zone: UTC-5 (Eastern (EST))
  - Summer (DST): UTC-4 (EDT)
- ZIP code: 12733
- Area code: 845
- FIPS code: 36-25241
- GNIS feature ID: 0978951
- Website: www.townoffallsburg.com

Fallsburg is a town in Sullivan County, New York, United States. The town is in the eastern part of the county. The population was 14,192 at the 2020 census. It is not to be confused with the hamlet of Fallsburg which bears a similar name and is within the town of Fallsburg.

== History ==
On March 9, 1826, the New York State Legislature passed an act establishing the town of Fallsburg. The town was created from parts of the towns of Thompson and Neversink. Fallsburg takes its name from a waterfall on the Neversink River and was established in 1826. One month later, on April 4, the first town meeting was held in the schoolhouse where the hamlet of Fallsburg is today.

The Neversink River runs from north to south through the town and played an important role in its early development. In the late 1780s, the valley above the falls on the Neversink was known as having fertile and cheap land. This brought an influx of settlers from Ulster County. By 1800, the upper areas along the river were well settled by the people in the already existing towns and by newcomers.

The region was primarily a farming community during the first part of the 1800s. Life during this time was frugal. The long haul over the mountains to Kingston prevented a lot of trade, and it sometimes took 90 days for mail to reach Fallsburg from Kingston. When the Delaware and Hudson Canal opened in the area in 1828, it brought many changes. Now the nearest place to trade was Ellenville. Up until this time, Hasbrouck was the major settlement in the area. The upper Neversink River between Woodbourne and Hasbrouck was the most settled because of the right flatlands that were found along the river. In the 1790s, there were a number of sawmills and gristmills that were built to further establish the area. The hamlet was a major business area for many years with a variety of shops and stores and its own post office from 1846 to 1923.

The town, within the Catskill Mountains, is in the heart of a once-popular predominantly Jewish summer resort area known as the Borscht Belt.

== Geography ==
The eastern town line is the border of Ulster County. Fallsburg is bordered to the southeast by the town of Mamakating, to the south by the town of Thompson, to the west by the town of Liberty, to the north by the town of Neversink, and to the east by the town of Wawarsing.

The town has many small lakes, ponds, wooded areas, and former dairy farms. It is also by the Catskill Mountains.

Major bodies of water in the town include Loch Sheldrake (also known as Sheldrake Pond), Echo Lake, Evans Lake, Morningside Lake, Pleasure Lake, East Pond, and the Neversink River.

According to the United States Census Bureau, the town has a total area of 79.0 square miles (205 km^{2}), of which 77.6 square miles (201 km^{2}) are land and 1.4 square miles (3.6 km^{2}) (1.73%) are water.

== Demographics ==
Historical population
Census	Pop.	Note	%±
1830	1,173		—
1840	1,782		51.9%
1850	2,626		47.4%
1860	3,333		26.9%
1870	3,206		−3.8%
1880	2,945		−8.1%
1890	3,041		3.3%
1900	2,974		−2.2%
1910	3,782		27.2%
1920	4,769		26.1%
1930	4,716		−1.1%
1940	5,682		20.5%
1950	6,321		11.2%
1960	6,748		6.8%
1970	7,959		17.9%
1980	9,862		23.9%
1990	11,445		16.1%
2000	12,231		6.9%
2010	12,870		5.2%
2020	14,192		10.3%
U.S. Decennial Census 2020

As of the census of 2000, there were 12,234 people, 3,761 households, and 2,478 families residing in the town. The population density was 157.6 inhabitants per square mile (60.8/km^{2}). There were 6,661 housing units at an average density of 85.8 per square mile (33.1/km^{2}). The racial makeup of the town was 75.19% White, 15.56% African American, 0.43% Native American, 1.17% Asian, 0.03% Pacific Islander, 5.04% from other races, and 2.58% from two or more races. Hispanic or Latino of any race were 14.53% of the population.

There were 3,761 households, out of which 33.3% had children under the age of 18 living with them, 47.0% were married couples living together, 14.0% had a female householder with no husband present, and 34.1% were non-families. 27.6% of all households were made up of individuals, and 10.2% had someone living alone who was 65 years of age or older. The average household size was 2.60 and the average family size was 3.16.

In the town, the population was spread out, with 23.3% under the age of 18, 8.9% from 18 to 24, 32.8% from 25 to 44, 24.0% from 45 to 64, and 11.0% who were 65 years of age or older. The median age was 37 years. For every 100 females, there were 133.8 males. For every 100 females age 18 and over, there were 142.2 males.

The median income for a household in the town was $33,036, and the median income for a family was $39,216. Males had a median income of $31,949 versus $24,583 for females. The per capita income for the town was $16,744. About 15.9% of families and 20.5% of the population were below the poverty line, including 30.2% of those under age 18 and 14.0% of those age 65 or over.

== Arts and culture ==
=== Annual cultural events ===
Fallsburg celebrates Francis Currey Day each year in honor of Francis S. Currey and other military veterans. Currey received a Medal of Honor for his bravery in World War II.

=== Tourism ===
The Living Torah Museum, an Orthodox Jewish museum, has a branch in Fallsburg. The area has also served as a bastion for stand-up comedy since the mid-20th century. Comedy legends, including Woody Allen, Rodney Dangerfield, Jerry Seinfeld, and Henny Youngman, performed there, as did Sid Caesar, Billy Crystal, Buddy Hackett, Gabe Kaplan, Andy Kaufman, and Joan Rivers. Jerry Lewis worked as a busboy while his parents did a vaudeville act. He would entertain customers while cleaning tables, giving him a chance to hone his skills while upping his tips. Famed prize fighters, former world heavyweight champions like Rocky Marciano, Sonny Liston, and Muhammad Ali, Leon Spinks, Ingemar Johansson and Floyd Patterson trained there.

== Parks and recreation ==
Several parks and golf courses are located in the area, including Terry Brae Golf Course, Lochmor Golf Course, Pines Golf Course, Morningside Park and Mountaindale Park. International retreat center Shree Muktananda Ashram is also located in Fallsburg. The center provides a location for students of Siddha Yoga to practice the daily practices of sadhana.

== Education ==
=== Primary and secondary schools ===
The Fallsburg Central School District serves the town of Fallsburg. The district is the "Home of the Comets". Schools in the district include Benjamin Cosor Elementary School and Fallsburg Junior Senior High School.

=== Colleges and universities ===
Two colleges in the area serve Fallsburg. Sullivan County Community College, now known as SUNY Sullivan, is located in Fallsburg and is a two-year community college. Yeshiva Gedolah Zichron Moshe is a rabbinical college located in Fallsburg.

=== Summer camps ===
Stagedoor Manor is a performing arts summer camp located in Loch Sheldrake, New York. Each summer, Stagedoor Manor holds three three-week-long sessions that start in late June and end in late August. Approximately 280 campers, ranging in age from 10 to 18, attend each session.

There are numerous summer day camps and summer sleepaway camps in the township. Lansman's Day Camp. located on Murphy Road in Woodbourne, New York, is the longest continuous operating day camp in Sullivan County. The day camp first opened its doors in the summer of 1949. LDC has an eight-week session starting the end of June. Lesser periods of half season and weekly sessions are available. Age ranges from three (nursery) to "senior" campers at 13 and 14 years old.

=== Public libraries ===
The Fallsburg Library serves the town and is located in South Fallsburg. It has been in operation since 1991.

== Prisons ==
Two correctional facilities are located in the area and operated by the New York State Department of Correctional Services. Woodbourne Correctional Facility is a medium security men's prison located in the hamlet of Woodbourne, New York and Sullivan Correctional Facility is a maximum security prison for male inmates located in Fallsburg. Sullivan Correctional is slated to close in November 2024.

== Notable people ==
- Francis S. Currey – former United States Army soldier and a recipient of the United States military's highest decoration—the Medal of Honor—for his actions in World War II. Grew up in Hurleyville in a dairy farming family.
- Gavin DeGraw – singer
- Joey DeGraw, singer-songwriter
- Sari Feldman, librarian
- Andrew Neiderman – former English teacher at Fallsburg Central High School. Prolific author of horror novels, including The Devil's Advocate, made into a movie starring Al Pacino.
- Rufus Palen– U.S. congressman, grew up in Fallsburg
- Joseph "Diamond Jo" Reynolds– steamship tycoon, born in Fallsburg
- Allen Young – writer, grew up in Glen Wild

== Communities and locations in Fallsburg ==
- Divine Corners – A location north of Loch Sheldrake. Home to many bungalow colonies.
- Fallsburg – The hamlet of Fallsburg, formerly known as "Neversink Falls" or "Old Falls," or "Fallsburgh", is on Route 42.
- Glen Wild – A hamlet by the southern town line.
- Hasbrouck – A hamlet in the northern part of the town.
- Hurleyville – A hamlet formerly called "Luzon Station."
- Loch Sheldrake – A hamlet in the northwestern part of the town on Route 52.
- Mountain Dale – A hamlet in the southeastern part of the town, formerly called "Sandburg."
- South Fallsburg – A hamlet by the western town line.
- Woodridge – The Village of Woodridge. Formerly known as "Centreville."
- Woodbourne – A hamlet on Route 52 north of Fallsburg hamlet.
- Woodbourne Correctional Facility – A New York prison south of Woodbourne.
- Shree Muktananda Ashram is located on Brickman Road. It is the Western headquarters of the Siddha Yoga organisation.
- Gardnertown was a town between Fallsburg and Woodridge at the base of Olympic Hill. It no longer exists.

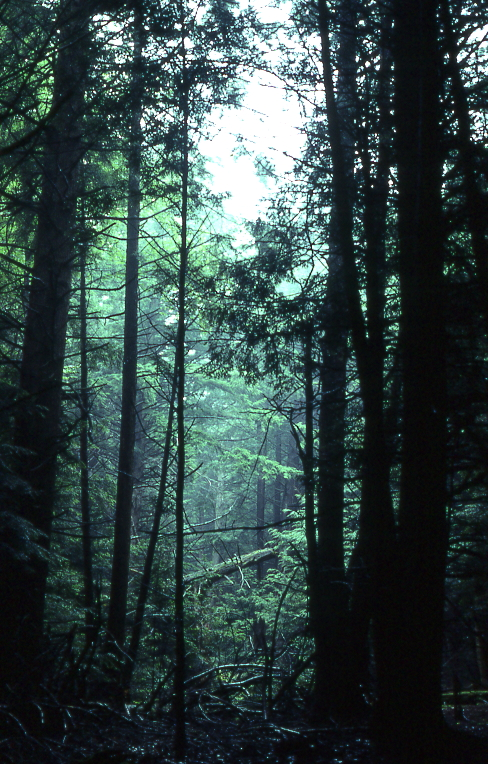
Characteristic evergreen forest at Fallsburg

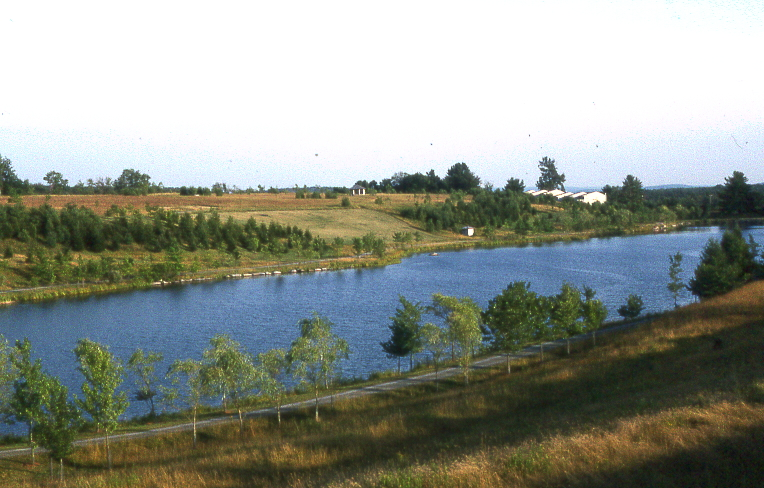
Lake Nityananda, on the property of the Shree Muktananda Ashram, Fallsburg
