= Hurleyville, New York =

Hurleyville
- hamlet and CDP
- Location of Hurleyville in New York
- Coordinates: 41°43′55″N 74°36′05″W
- Country: United States
- State: New York
- County: Sullivan
- Elevation: 1,401 ft (427 m)
- ZIP code: 12747
- Area code: 845

Hurleyville is a hamlet in the town of Fallsburg in Sullivan County, New York, United States. The town lies along County Route 104 and was originally developed because it was on the main route between the villages of Liberty and Monticello, New York. The zip code for Hurleyville is 12747.

Hurleyville is bordered by the town of Thompson, the town of Liberty, the hamlet of Loch Sheldrake and the hamlet of South Fallsburg.

== History ==
Hurleyville was originally settled by William Hurley. The local economy was originally centered on dairy farming, but gradually became part of the Catskills Borscht Belt resort area. During its heyday as a resort Hurleyville was home to many popular summer hotels, bungalow colonies and boarding houses, the biggest and best known was the rather grand Columbia Hotel located atop Columbia Hill.

Hurleyville was a station stop along the New York, Ontario & Western Railway (O&W). Due to mail getting mixed in with that of Hurley, New York, Hurleyville was temporarily renamed "Luzon Station". This name was chosen because the postmaster had a son stationed at Luzon Island in the Philippines. Automobile competition led to abandonment of the O&W in 1957.

There are currently two restaurants in the hamlet named "Casa Mia" and the "Tango Cafe".

== Services ==
Hurleyville residents are part of the town of Fallsburg. Students attend Benjamen Coser Elementary School and Fallsburg Central High School. Sullivan County Community College is approximately one mile away in Loch Sheldrake.

Hurleyville is served by the Hurleyville Volunteer Fire Department; law enforcement services are provided by the Fallsburg Police Department. Hurleyville is also home to the Sullivan County Historical Society and the Sullivan County Museum.

== Former resorts ==
- Arcadia Lake Hotel
- Ascot House
- Elmore House
- Columbia Hotel
- Brophy's Hotel
- Fialkowsky's Bungalow Colony
- Kramer's on Luzon Lake
- Replansky's Bungalow Colony
- Forest Inn Hotel
- Pidhorodeckys Resort
- The Clinton House
- Morningside Hotel
- Grandview Hotel

== Notable people ==
- Francis S. Currey, World War II Medal of Honor recipient
- Mel Brooks, American comedian, actor, writer, director, producer and composer
