= NJCAA Division III men's basketball championship =

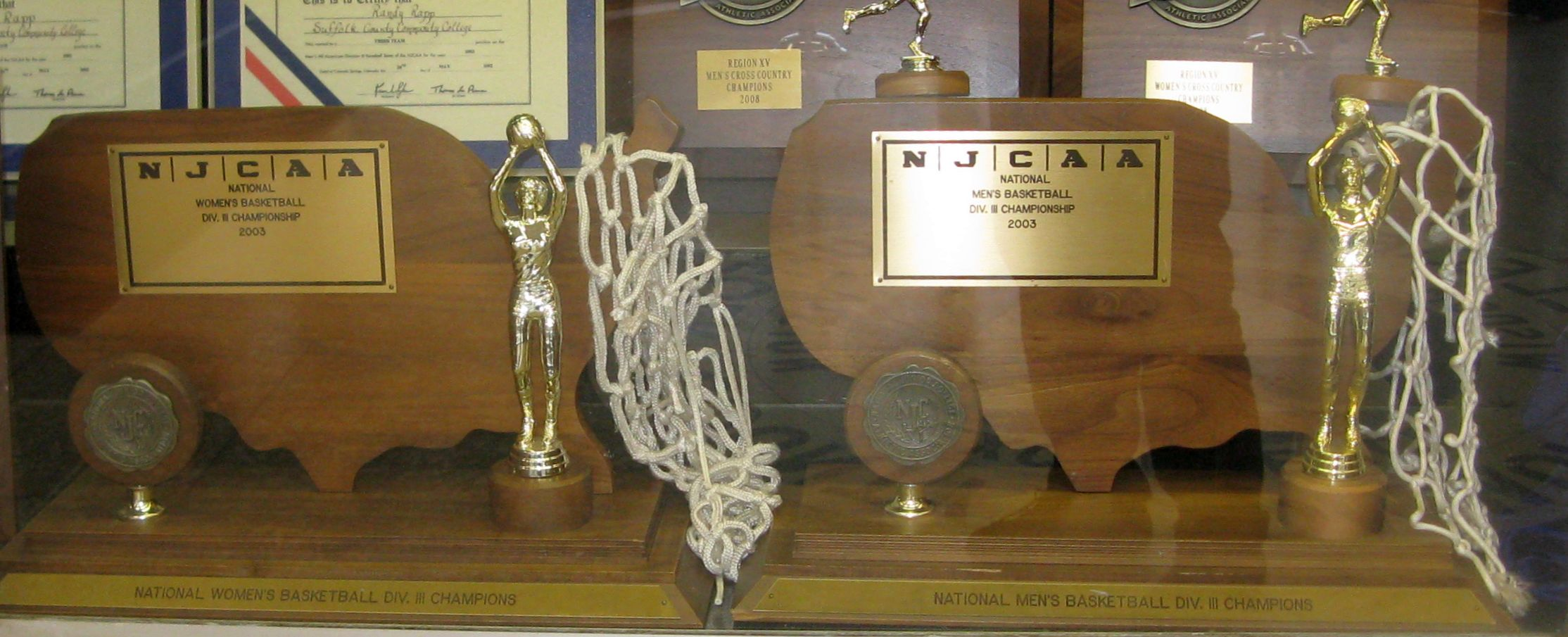
2003 men and women trophies at Suffolk County Community College

The National Junior College Athletic Association (NJCAA) Men's Division III Basketball Championships consists of eight teams playing over a three-day period (Thursday-Saturday) in March to determine a National Champion. The tournament field is made up of teams that win either region or district championships that are required to earn entry into the tournament.

== Format ==
The Tournament is a standard eight-team tournament. Each team will play three games in the Tournament to determine first through eighth places.

One qualifier will emerge from each of the following districts

District 1	Region III
District 2	Regions IV & VII
District 3	Regions II & V
District 4	Region XIII
District 5	Region XV
District 6	Region XIX
District 7	Regions X, XVII & XX
District 8	Region XXI

Before teams begin to qualify for the tournament, a Blind Draw is done to determine the match-ups between the different districts in the Quarterfinals.

Quarterfinals
Game 1: Blind Draw vs. Blind Draw
Game 2: Blind Draw vs. Blind Draw
Game 3: Blind Draw vs. Blind Draw
Game 4: Blind Draw vs. Blind Draw

The Semi-Finals of the Tournament consist of the Winners of Game 1 and Game 2 of the Quarterfinals playing each other followed by the Winners of Game 3 and Game 4 of the Quarterfinals.

The Consolation Games consist of the Losers of Games 1 and 2 of the Quarters playing each other followed by the Losers of Games 3 and 4 of the Quarters playing each other.

Consolation Games & Semi-Finals
Game 5: Loser of Game 1 vs. Loser of Game 2
Game 6: Loser of Game 3 vs. Loser of Game 4
Game 7: Winner of Game 1 vs. Winner of Game 2
Game 8: Winner of Game 3 vs. Winner of Game 4

On the final day of the Tournament, teams play each other to find out which place they will finish.

Three teams ranging from 2nd place to 4th place are guaranteed to finish 2-1, with the National Title game loser finishing in 2nd.

Teams finishing from 5th place to 7th place will finish 1-2.

Only one team will finish 0-3 and that team will place in 8th.

The only team that finishes the tournament 3-0 will be the National Champion.

Championship Round
7th/8th Place Game: Loser of Game 5 vs. Loser of Game 6
4th/6th Place Game: Winner of Game 5 vs. Winner of Game 6
3rd/5th Place Game: Loser of Game 7 vs. Loser of Game 8
National Championship Game: Winner of Game 7 vs. Winner of Game 8

== Tournament hosts ==
SUNY Delhi (1991–2010) (Delhi, New York)

Sullivan County Community College (2011–2016) (Loch Sheldrake, New York)

Rochester Community and Technical College (2017, 2019–2020, 2027) (Rochester, Minnesota)

SUNY Sullivan (2018) (Loch Sheldrake, New York)

Rock Valley College (2022) (Rockford, Illinois)

Herkimer College (2023–2026, 2028) (Herkimer, New York)

== Past tournament results ==
The list of NJCAA Division III Men's Basketball Championship winners, along with runners-up and final scores, follows.

Year	Winner	Runner up	Score
2026	Northern Essex Community College	Dallas College	68-62
2025	Mohawk Valley Community College	Herkimer College	58-51
2024	North Lake College	Herkimer College	74-61
2023	Brookdale Community College	Sandhills Community College	90-82
2022	North Lake College	Genesee Community College	83-80 ^{OT}
2020	Sandhills Community College	Mohawk Valley Community College	93-89
2019	Herkimer College	Rock Valley College	72-60
2018	Brookdale Community College	Nassau Community College	70-57
2017	North Lake College	Elgin Community College	66-56
2016	Rock Valley College	Rochester Community and Technical College	88-75
2015	Richland College	Rock Valley College	67-64
2014	Rock Valley College	Caldwell Community College & Technical Institute	79-69
2013	Brookdale Community College	Eastfield College	61-55
2012	Sandhills Community College	Cedar Valley College	101-86
2011	Mountain View College	Rochester Community and Technical College	72-64
2010	Joliet Junior College	Rochester Community and Technical College	94-82
2009	Richland College	Minneapolis Community and Technical College	58-57
2008	North Lake College	Joliet Junior College	73-70
2007	Sullivan County Community College	Northland Community and Technical College	74-68
2006	North Lake College	Gloucester County College	78-65
2005	Hostos Community College	Joliet Junior College	73-71
2004	Suffolk County Community College	Eastfield College	83-81 ^{OT}
2003	Suffolk County Community College	College of DuPage	61-56
2002	College of DuPage	Sullivan County Community College	73-58
2001	Cedar Valley College	Sullivan County Community College	78-55
2000	Roxbury Community College	College of DuPage	103-79
1999	Richland College	Vermilion Community College	80-76
1998	Minnesota State Community and Technical College	Monroe College	94-85 ^{OT}
1997	Eastfield College	Jefferson Community College	79-75
1996	Sullivan County Community College	Gloucester County College	74-63
1995	Sullivan County Community College	Corning Community College	93-80
1994	Gloucester County College	Sullivan County Community College	71-69
1993	Onondaga Community College	Minneapolis Community and Technical College	84-78
1992	Sullivan County Community College	Eastfield College	101-76
1991	Herkimer County Community College	Community College of Rhode Island	108-105

== Championship leaders ==
Team	Championships	Winning year(s)
North Lake College	5	2006, 2008, 2017, 2022, 2024
Sullivan County Community College	4	1992, 1995, 1996, 2007
Brookdale Community College	3	2013, 2018, 2023
Richland College	3	1999, 2009, 2015
Sandhills Community College	2	2012, 2020
Herkimer County Community College	2	1991, 2019
Rock Valley College	2	2014, 2016
Suffolk County Community College	2	2003, 2004
Northern Essex Community College	1	2026
Mohawk Valley Community College	1	2025
Mountain View College	1	2011
Joliet Junior College	1	2010
Hostos Community College	1	2005
College of DuPage	1	2002
Cedar Valley College	1	2001
Roxbury Community College	1	2000
Minnesota State Community and Technical College	1	1998
Eastfield College	1	1997
Gloucester County College	1	1994
Onondaga Community College	1	1993

== See also ==
- NJCAA Men's Division I Basketball Championship
- NJCAA Men's Division II Basketball Championship
- NJCAA Women's Basketball Championship
