= New York State Route 42 =

Highway in New York

New York State Route 42
- NY 42 highlighted in red, former segment in grey

Route information
- Maintained by NYSDOT and the city of Port Jervis
- Length: 52.08 mi (83.81 km)
- Existed: 1930–present

Southern segment
- Length: 40.66 mi (65.44 km)
- South end: US 6 / US 209 in Port Jervis
- Major intersections: Future I-86 / NY 17 in Monticello
- North end: NY 55 in Neversink

Northern segment
- Length: 11.42 mi (18.38 km)
- South end: NY 28 in Shandaken
- North end: NY 23A in Lexington

Location
- Country: United States
- State: New York
- Counties: Orange, Sullivan, Ulster, Greene

Highway system
- New York Highways; Interstate; US; State; Reference; Parkways
← NY 41A	→ NY 43

New York State Route 42 (NY 42) is a north–south, discontinuous state highway in the Catskill Mountains region of New York in the United States. The southernmost of the highway's two segments begins at an intersection with U.S. Route 6 (US 6) and US 209 in Port Jervis and ends at a junction with NY 55 near the Rondout Reservoir in Neversink. NY 42's northern segment runs from NY 28 in Shandaken to NY 23A in Lexington. The 41-mile (66 km) southern segment is located in Orange County and Sullivan County, while the 11-mile (18 km) northern segment is in Ulster County and Greene County.

NY 42 is one of three state routes in New York that is split into two segments; the others are NY 24 and NY 878, both located on Long Island. Like NY 24, NY 42 was a continuous route when it was assigned as part of the 1930 renumbering of state highways in New York. The portion of the route between Neversink and Shandaken was eliminated in the mid-1930s.

== Route description ==
=== Southern segment ===
==== Port Jervis to Forestburgh Pond ====
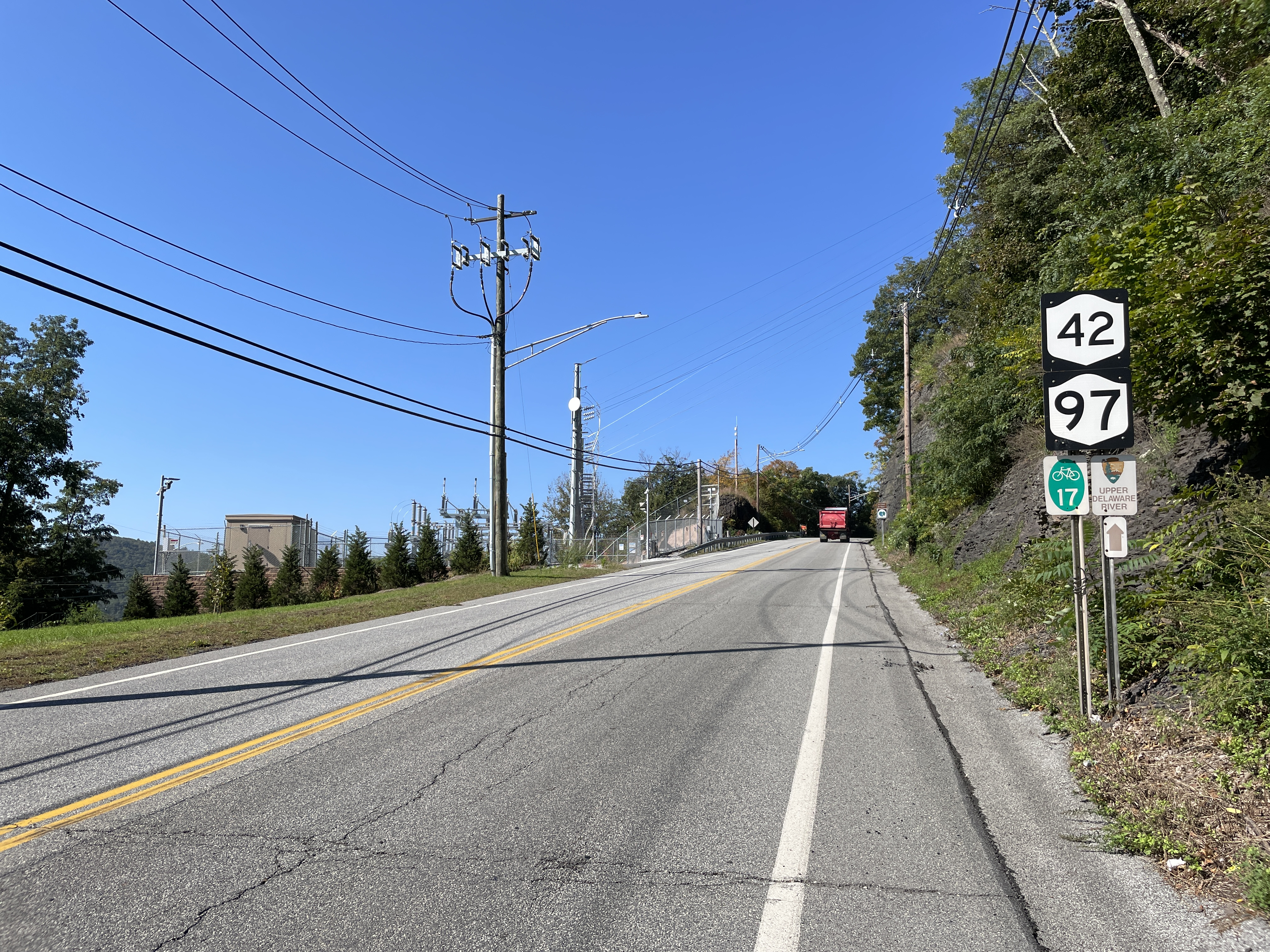
NY 42/NY 97 northbound in Port Jervis

NY 42 begins at an intersection with US 6 and US 209 (Pike Street / East Main Street) in the city of Port Jervis. NY 42 proceeds northwestward, immediately concurrent with NY 97 on West Main Street, a two-lane commercial street through Port Jervis. After passing far east of the Port Jervis station on Metro-North Railroad's Port Jervis Line, NY 42 and NY 97 break off West Main Street for Park Avenue, paralleling the Norfolk Southern Southern Tier Line (ex-Erie Railroad Delaware Division tracks) and Elks–Brox Memorial Park. NY 42/NY 97 continue northwest through Port Jervis as a two-lane wooded road before crossing into the town of Deerpark. In Deerpark, NY 42 and NY 97 are a two-lane commercial roadway alongside the Southern Tier Line, entering the hamlet of Sparrowbush.

In Sparrowbush, NY 42 and NY 97 becomes residential, accessing Eddy Farm Golf to the south, before entering the center of the hamlet, where NY 97 continues northwest on the right-of-way, while NY 42 proceeds north on a new roadway. NY 42 proceeds northward a two-lane residential street through Sparrowbush, soon passing Old Cahoonzie Road to the south. Running up a mountainside, the route parallels NY 97, which runs to the west, north out of Sparrowbush. Through the town of Deerpark, NY 42 continues as a two-lane residential street, intersecting with Old Cahoonzie Road as it becomes a two-lane rural road. A short distance from the change of scenery, NY 42 enters the hamlet of Cahoonzie, which consists of a few residences and dense woods. After an intersection with Peenpack Trail, the route bends northwest into dense woods, running past ponds and a cluster of homes on the nearby hillside.

NY 42 continues through Deerpark, crossing a creek near Whitehead Road as it winds north and northwest for several miles. The route intersects with Old Plank Road, where it bends northward once again, becoming a two-lane rural road once again through fields before crossing the county line into Sullivan County. In Sullivan County, NY 42 is in the town of Forestburgh and immediately into the hamlet of Hartwood Club. Running east of the Rib Reservoir, the route remains a two-lane road through fields, until Baer Road, where residences begin to appear once again. Making an elongated bend to the northwest, the route passes east of Burnt Hope Lake as it winds northwest through the town of Forestburgh. At an intersection with King Road, NY 42 bends northward once again, entering the hamlet of Forestburg, where NY 42 intersects with County Route 43 (CR 43; Forestburgh Road) and CR 48 (Hartwood Road) alongside Forestburgh Pond.

==== Monticello and Kiamesha Lake ====
Continuing north of Forestburgh Pond, NY 42 bends northeast as a two-lane field road, passing through the hamlet of Forestburgh, north of Merriewold Lake. In the hamlet, NY 42 passes several residences on the southern end and in downtown, where CR 108 (St. Josephs Road) intersects. After bending northeast alongside some residences, NY 42 comes near St. Josephs Lake in the town of Thompson. In Thompson, NY 42 continues northward as a two-lane residential roadway, passing east of Wildwood Lake and to the west of Monticello Airport, which is accessible via Cantrell Road. After Cantrell Road, NY 42 bends northwest, varying as a two-lane residential and rural roadway through Thompson. The route bends northeast once again, returning to its residential state as it intersects with CR 45 and CR 45A (Sackett Lake Road). After crossing under power lines, it enters the village of Monticello.

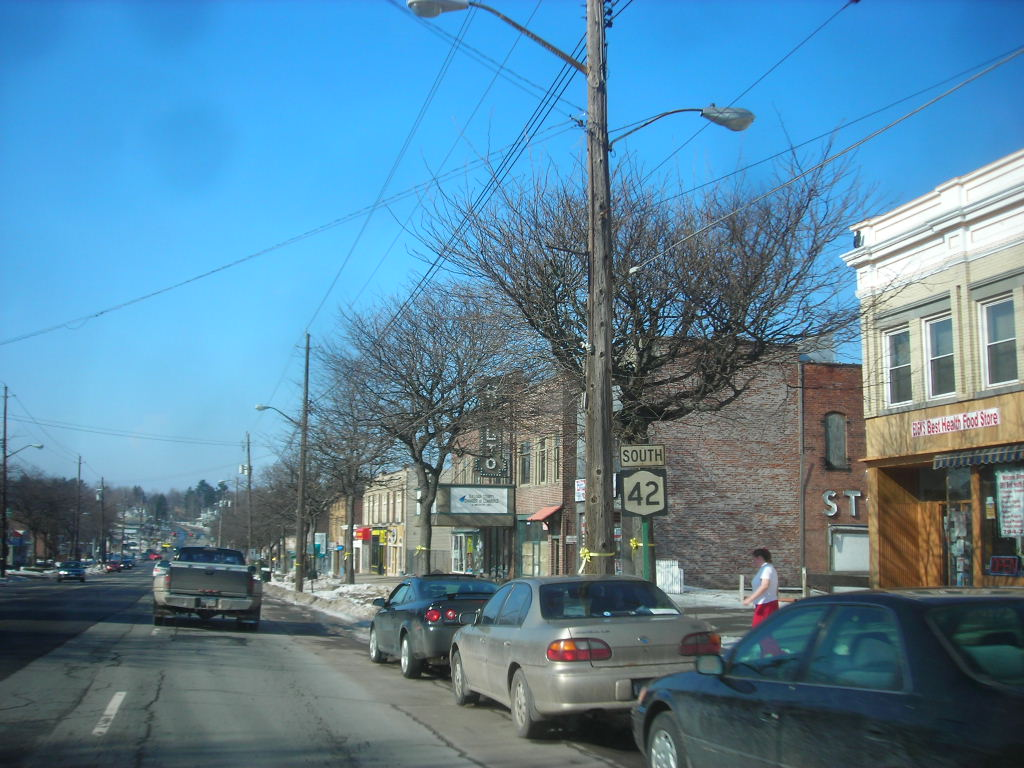
NY 42 southbound through the village of Monticello

In Monticello, NY 42 gains the moniker of Forestburgh Road, passing through a large residential section of the village. After passing Monticello High School, the route bends northeast, entering downtown Monticello. The route becomes commercial just before an intersecting with Broadway, where NY 42 turns east onto Broadway and crosses through town as a four-lane main commercial street. A block after intersecting with the village continuation of CR 102 (St. John Street), NY 42 abandons Broadway for Pleasant Street, another two-lane commercial street through downtown Monticello. After an intersection with Rock Ridge Avenue, NY 42 enters an interchange with NY 17 (the Quickway; exit 105). The Pleasant Street moniker is dropped after the cloverleaf interchange, as NY 42 returns into the town of Thompson.

In Thompson, NY 42 continues north, intersecting with the southern terminus of CR 103 (Anawana Lake Road). NY 42 passes west of Thompson Square Mall as it bends north into the area of Kiamesha Lake. After bending south through the valley, NY 42 intersects with Concord Road and becomes a lakeside roadway alongside the western shore of Kiamesha Lake, soon bending northeast into the hamlet of Kiamesha Lake. Through Kiamesha Lake, the route is a two-lane shore roadway, with residences running along the northern side. After bending to the northern end to the lake, NY 42 intersects with CR 109 (Kiamesha Lake Road). Crossing northeast from Kiamesha Lake, NY 42 winds its way through the town of Thompson.

==== South Fallsburg to Grahamsville ====
After leaving Kiamesha Lake, NY 42 continues through the town of Thompson as a two-lane residential/rural roadway before crossing into the town of Fallsburg. In Fallsburg, NY 42 winds northeast past a large residential development, intersecting with the northern terminus of CR 161 (Heiden Road). With the moniker of Main Street, NY 42 enters the hamlet of South Fallsburg as a two-lane residential street. At an intersection with Stratton Hill Road, the route and Main Street bend eastward, crossing over the northern edge of Pleasure Lake. Bending northeast through downtown South Fallsburg, NY 42 becomes a two-lane residential street, crossing a former railroad grade at Railroad Plaza. After Railroad Plaza, NY 42 continues through South Fallsburg as a residential street before leaving the hamlet.

Northeast of South Fallsburg, NY 42 drops the Main Street moniker, making a bend eastward past a large residential complex. Beginning a parallel of the Neversink River, NY 42 bends northward into the hamlet of Fallsburg, where CR 52 (Brickman Road) and CR 53 (Old Falls Road) intersect and terminate at the same junction. Through Fallsburg, NY 42 is a two-lane residential street alongside the Neversink. NY 42 bends away from the Neversink north of the hamlet, entering an industrial area next to a large pond, bending northwest into the hamlet of Woodbourne. In Woodbourne, NY 42 intersects with NY 52 and becomes a two-lane commercial street concurrency. The routes soon become residential as they pass through Woodbourne, crossing over the Neversink and NY 42 bends north away from NY 52 along the riverside.

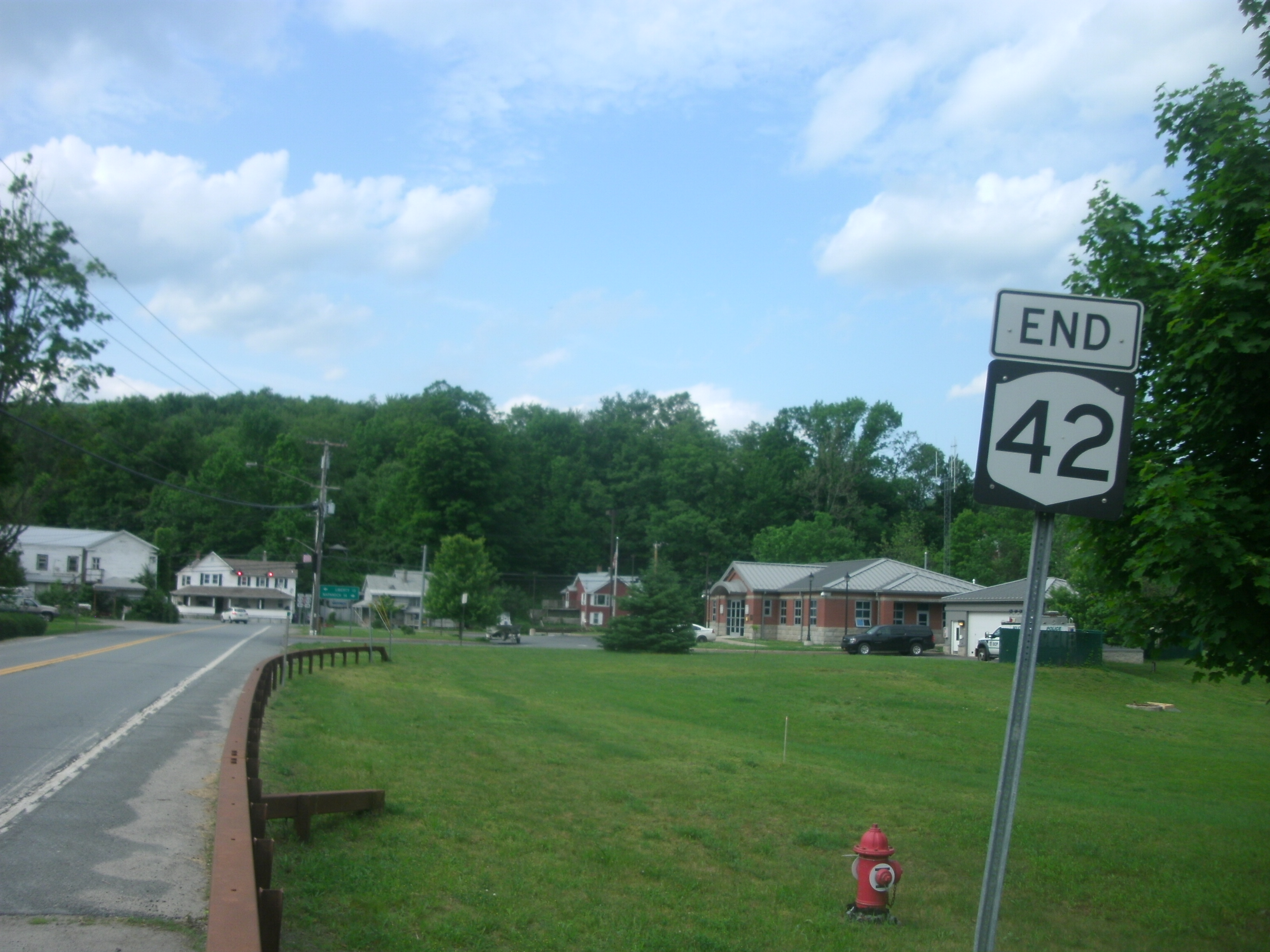
NY 42's terminus for the southern segment at NY 55 in Grahamsville

Continuing north through the town of Fallsburg, NY 42 remains a two-lane residential street alongside the Neversink River. The Neversink forks eastward as NY 42 bends northeast, but both soon rejoin as it passes a small residential segment. At the junction with Hasbrouck Road, NY 42 darts eastward alongside a brook as a two-lane wooded residential road. At Couzines Road, NY 42 bends northeast again, passing a large pond, entering the hamlet of Hasbrouck. In Hasbrouck, NY 42 passes several residences before intersecting with the western terminus of CR 154 (Ulster Heights Road). After CR 154, NY 42 intersects with Thunder Hill Road, where it bends eastward once again, paralleling to the north of CR 154. The route bends northeast at a junction with Low Road, passing west of Beaverdam Pond. NY 42 continues northward away from the Pond into the town of Neversink.

In the town of Neversink, NY 42 continues northward as a two-lane residential/rural street, entering the Catskill State Park. After crossing into the park, NY 42 intersects with the western terminus of CR 156 (South Hill Road), where NY 42 turns northwest and enters the hamlet of Grahamsville. In Grahamsville, NY 42 passes several local commercial businesses before crossing over Chestnut Creek. A short distance into Grahamsville, NY 42 intersects with NY 55. This intersection serves as the northern terminus of the southern segment of NY 42.

=== Former middle segment ===
Upon its inception in the 1930 state highway renumbering, NY 42 was routed along a stretch of roadway through the Catskill State Park from Grahamsville to Shandaken, connecting to its current-day northern segment. This alignment consists of alignments of NY 55, Sullivan County Routes 19 and 157, Ulster County Route 47 and NY 28.

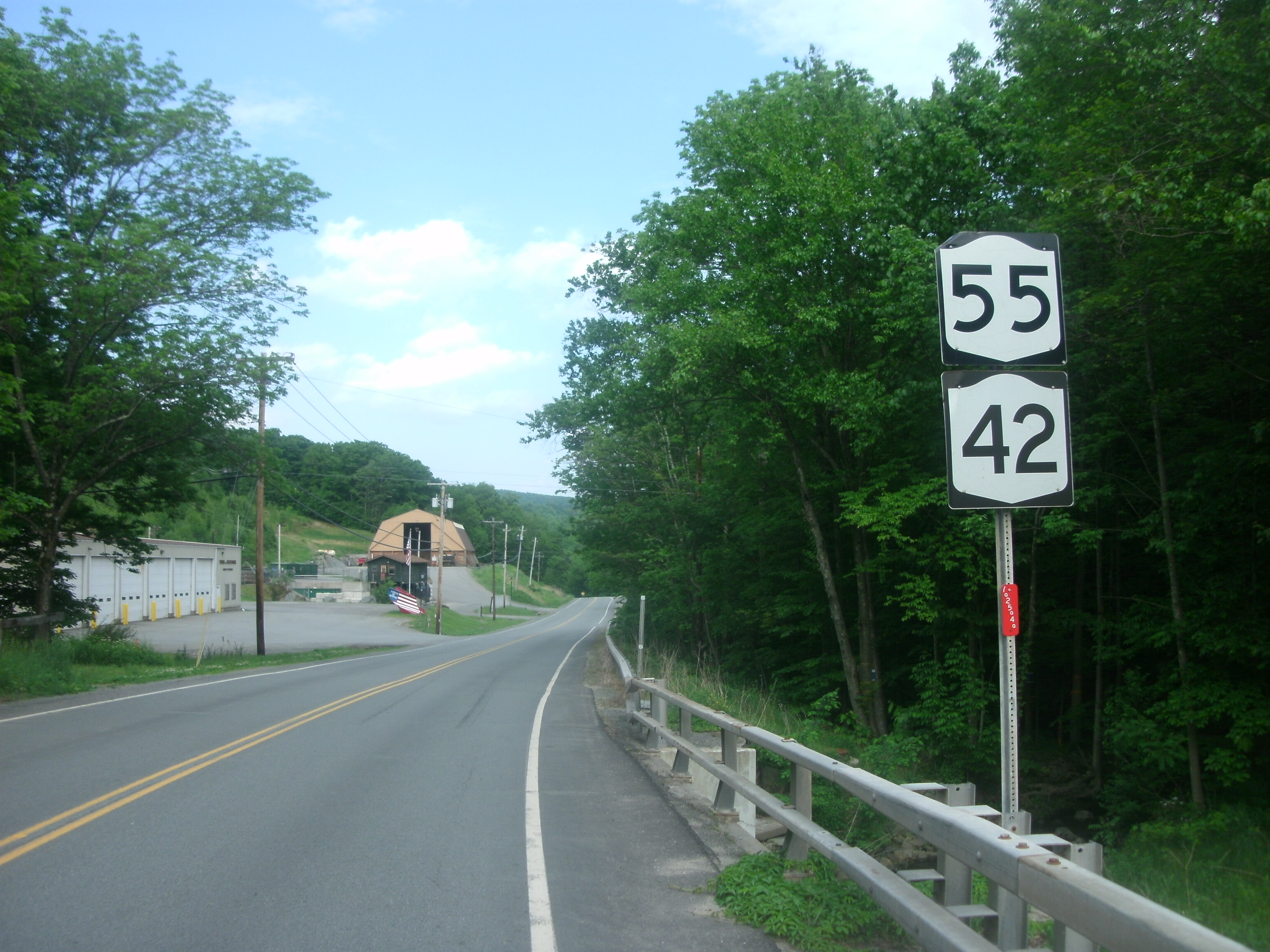
Sign on NY 55 in Curry near junction with beginning of former middle segment of NY 42, suggesting the concurrency still exists

==== Sullivan County ====
In Grahamsville, NY 55 proceeds northwest through the hamlet as a two-lane commercial and residential street. Bending north, the route soon leaves Grahamsville for the hamlet of Unionville, also within the town of Neversink, passing the Town of Neversink Park. Through Unionville, NY 55 is a two-lane residential street proceeding westward, intersecting with Pepacton Hollow Road. At this junction, NY 55 bends southwest into the hamlet of Curry. In Curry, the route crosses over a brook and intersects with CR 19 (Claryville Road). At this junction, CR 19 proceeds northward as a two-lane residential street at the initial junction. The route becomes rural, passing east of the Neversink River, as a two-lane woods road through the town of Neversink. CR 19 intersects with Cummings Road, where it bends northeast and comes within 1 mile (1.6 km) of the Neversink.

Still known as Claryville Road, CR 19 continues northeast, running alongside the Neversink River, where it passes a dirt road bridge over the river. A short distance after, CR 19 intersects with Hunter Road, which also crosses over the Neversink nearby. The route soon parallels the winding river north into the hamlet of Claryville, becoming a two-lane residential street through the hamlet. After passing the Claryville Reformed Church and its namesake cemetery, CR 19 intersects with the southern terminus of CR 157 (Frost Valley Road). CR 157 proceeds west across the Neversink River as a two-lane rural street north of Claryville. CR 157 continues north for a short distance alongside the West Branch of the Neversink before crossing the county line into Ulster County.

==== Ulster County ====
After crossing the county line, Sullivan CR 157 becomes Ulster CR 47, but retains the Frost Valley Road moniker in the town of Denning. CR 47 proceeds north through Denning alongside the West Branch in spurts. The route bends with the river in multiple directions before maintaining a northeastern pattern through the town. Running through the West Branch's narrow valley, CR 47 enters a small section of non-dense woods, with several buildings through the hamlet of Frost Valley. After passing the Frost Valley YMCA, CR 47 leaves the hamlet. Returning to the dense woods, CR 47, bends northeast, then southeast then east as it remains alongside the West Branch. The route bends northeast again, running into large spurts of residences on the hills above the roadway or alongside. After passing the hamlet of Branch, CR 47 crosses the Shandaken town line.

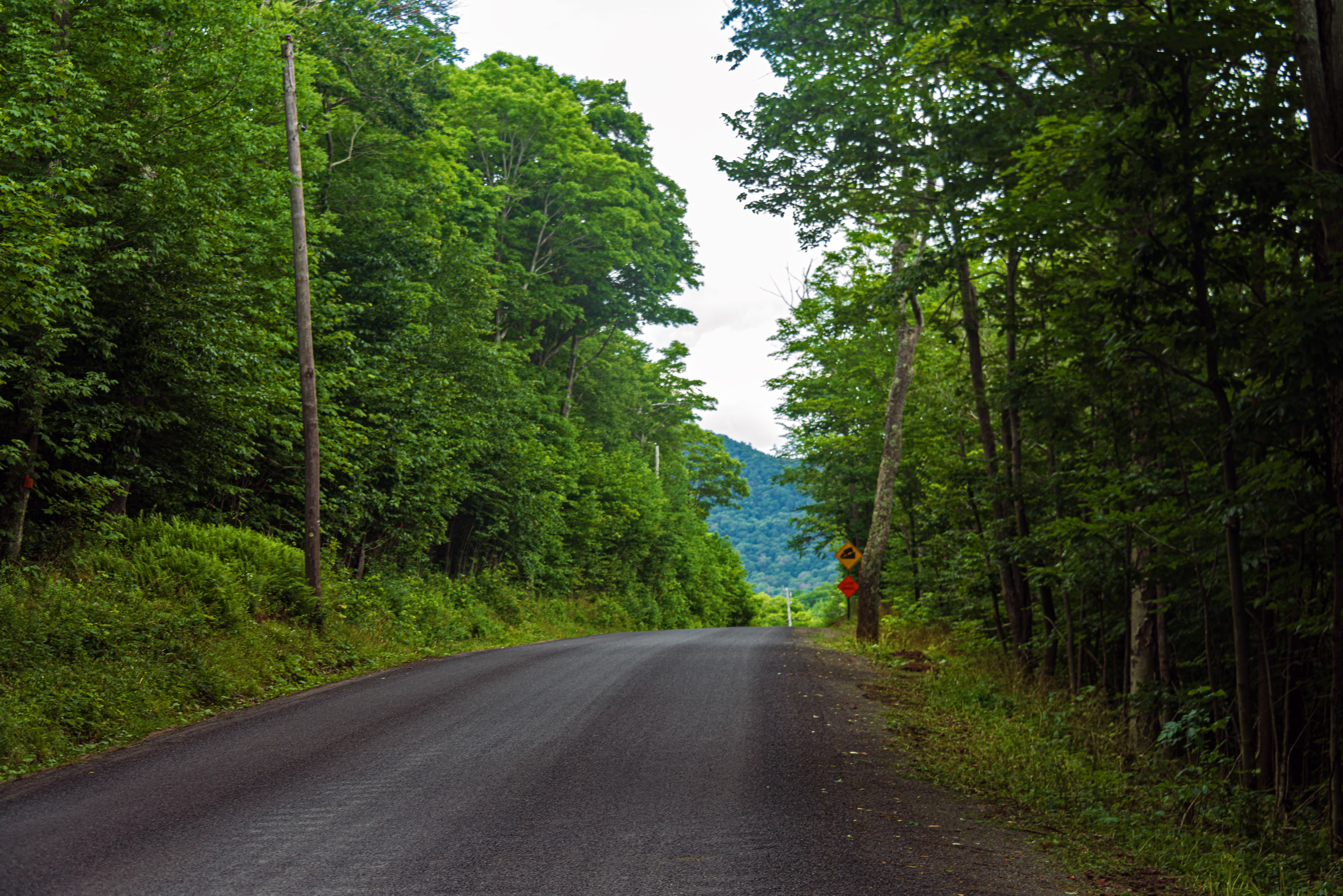
CR 47 next to Winnisook Lake

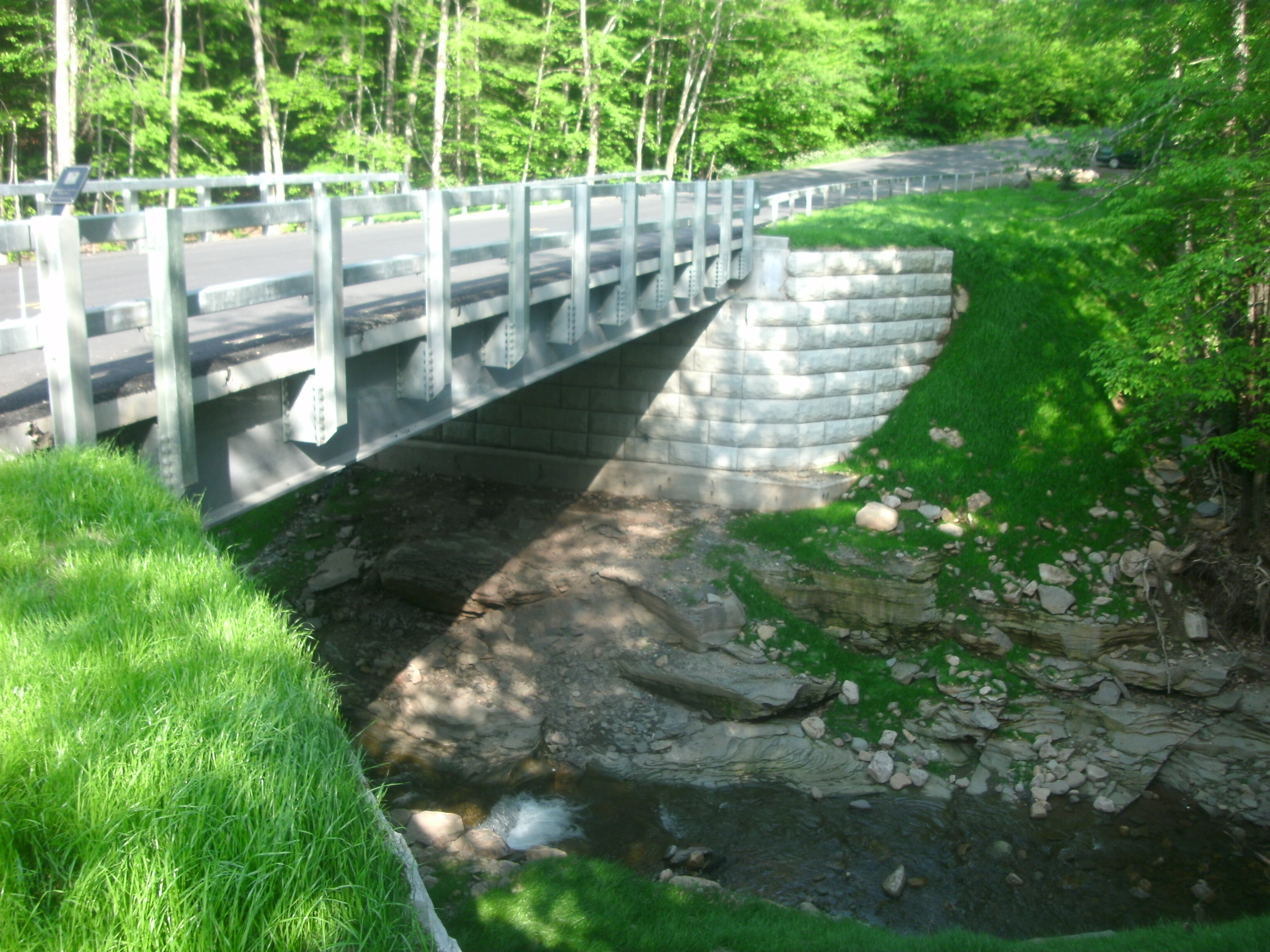
CR 47 crossing over Cascade Brook via the Stephen Fischer Memorial Cascade Brook Bridge in Shandaken

In Shandaken, CR 47 becomes Oliverea Road, continuing northeast. The route remains the two-lane dense woods road, passing the hiking trailhead for Slide Mountain, the Catskills' highest peak, then the range's highest lake, Winnisook Lake, on the east side of the roadway. Here CR 47 reaches 2,690 feet (820 m) in elevation, making it one of the highest paved public roads in New York. After a dart to the north, CR 47 bends east and enters a large hairpin turn, where it begins a descent alongside the Esopus Creek. After the hairpin turn, CR 47 proceeds westward, crossing over Cascade Brook and the Stephen F. Fischer Memorial Cascade Brooke Bridge, opened in May 2012 after the previous culvert bridge was destroyed by Hurricane Irene in 2011. After the Stephen F. Fischer Memorial Cascade Brooke Bridge, CR 47 continues west through Shandaken, passing several residences before turning northward near Valley View Road. CR 47 bends northwest, crossing alongside the Esopus Creek past some residences and a tennis court on the western side of the highway. After another dart to the northeast, CR 47 enters the hamlet of Oliverea, where it intersects with McKinley Hollow Road east of the creek.

After Oliverea, CR 47 bends northward and soon northeast as it continues away from the hamlet. CR 47 then bends northeast past some residences and soon north into the hamlet of Big Indian (also known as Big Indian Hollow). In Big Indian, CR 47 passes several residences before turning northeast and descending into a valley. After the descent, CR 47 intersects with NY 28 east of Big Indian Park. CR 47 continues north past NY 28, but NY 28 proceeds eastward through Shandaken as a two-lane rural roadway, paralleling Esopus Creek to the north and passing a large parking area before entering the hamlet of Shandaken. In Shandaken, NY 28 intersects with the southern terminus of the northern segment of NY 42.

=== Northern segment ===
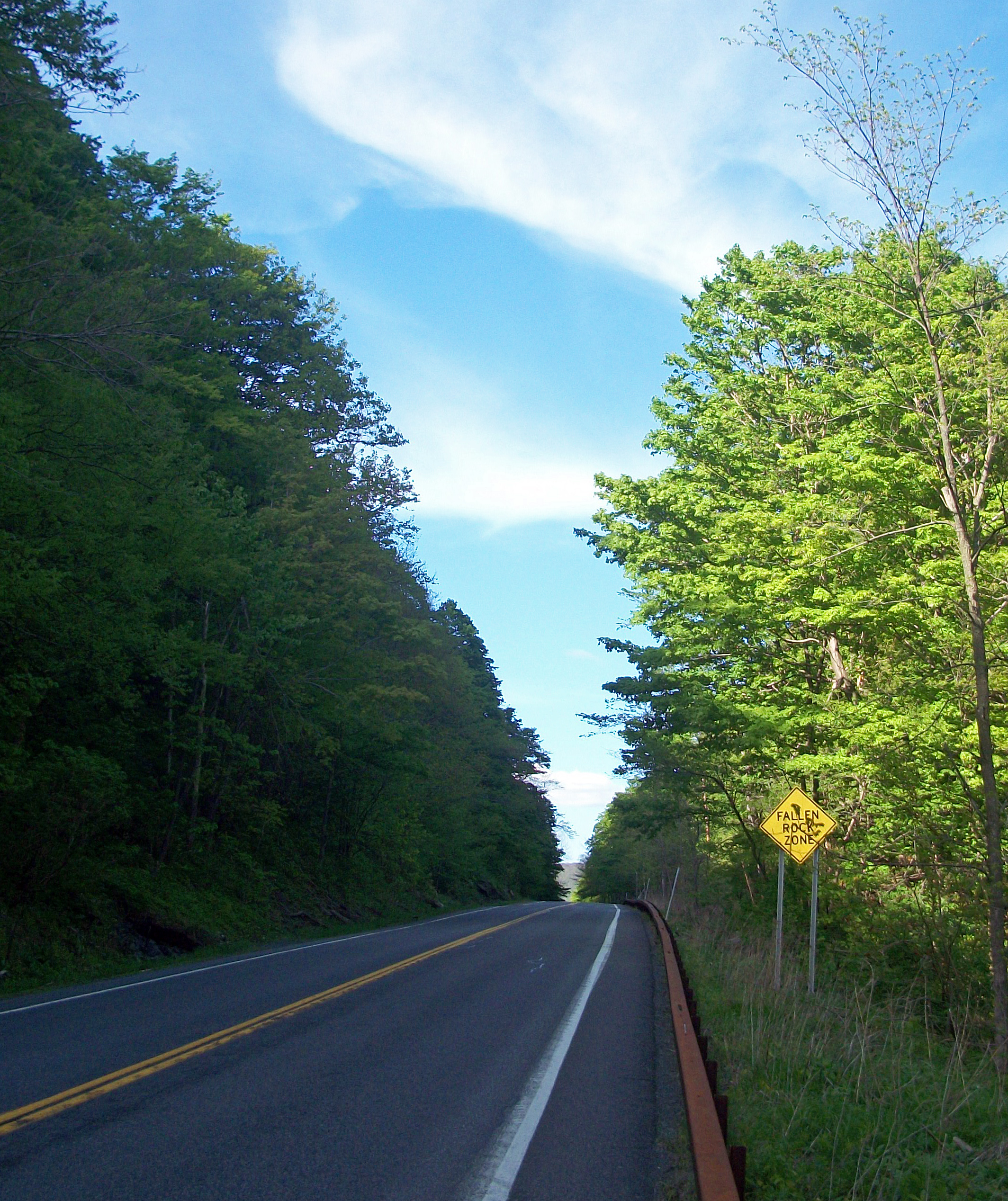
NY 42 northbound through Deep Notch in the town of Lexington

NY 42's northern segment proceeds northwest through the hamlet of Shandaken as a two-lane residential street, intersecting with the northern terminus of CR 47 (Creek Side Drive) at the shore of Esopus Creek. After CR 47, NY 42 passes south of Glen Brook Park, continuing northwest through the hamlet as a two-lane residential road. Before crossing under some power lines, NY 42 bends northeast, intersecting with Ford Road, where it turns northwest once again, paralleling the power lines. During this northwestern stretch alongside Halcott Mountain, NY 42 intersects with a former alignment of itself, which parallels to the west for a short distance. The route soon enters the hamlet of Bushnellville, where it becomes a two-lane residential street. Just after the intersection with Gooding Road, NY 42 bends northeast and crosses the county line into Greene County.

Upon crossing into Greene County, NY 42 is in the town of Lexington. Residences become more sporadic as NY 42 continues northward through Lexington, crossing under the power lines before bending northward through the dense woods of Halcott Mountain and Deep Notch, soon bending northeast into a large field area, where it enters the hamlet of West Kill. In West Kill, NY 42 intersects with the western terminus of CR 6 (Spruceton Road). NY 42 through West Kill consists of several residences along both sides of the highway before crossing over the namesake kill and bending northwest out of the hamlet. While running east of West Kill, NY 42 remains a two-lane residential roadway, crossing over the waterway once again and intersecting with Beechridge Road North.

At Beechridge Road North, NY 42 bends northeast along runs west of the West Kill before bending southeast into the hamlet of Lexington. In Lexington, NY 42 is a two-lane residential street that soon runs along Schoharie Creek through downtown. The two-lane street continues southeast until an intersection with Rappleyea Road, where NY 42 crosses the creek and intersects with the terminus of CR 13A. After CR 13A, NY 42 bends southeast then northeast through downtown Lexington and intersects with NY 23A. This junction serves as the northern terminus of the northern segment of NY 42, while the right-of-way continues north as CR 13 through the Catskill Park.

== History ==
When NY 42 was originally assigned as part of the 1930 renumbering of state highways in New York, it was a continuous route extending along a previously unnumbered roadway from Port Jervis in the south to Lexington in the north via Monticello, Neversink, and Shandaken. The section of NY 42 between Neversink and Shandaken was eliminated c. 1934 due to its low traffic volume and maintenance difficulties arising from the road's high elevation and exposure to severe winter weather. Even today the portion in Ulster County is visibly affected by these conditions.

=== Flooding ===
In 2014, the town of Lexington's Flood Commission hired Milone & MacBroom, a New Paltz engineering firm, to evaluate various options related to West Kill's stream course between the hamlets of West Kill and Lexington. Two years later, after having run computer simulations of flood events at all frequency levels up to 500-year, the firm concluded that the only option which provided benefit worth the cost was to replace the lowest bridge over the West Kill on NY 42, just below where Loucks Road forks off to the west.

Milone & MacBroom explained that the former bridge, due to both the 45-degree angle at which it crossed the West Kill and its height over the stream, constricted the stream flow during 100-year floods. The firm indicated it was consulting with the state Department of Transportation on the design for a new bridge. It called for the bridge's lower chord to be raised a foot; the additional freeboard would allow more water to flow downstream during floods, thus lowering their levels upstream, away from homes and businesses along the road. In 2017, the bridge was replaced at a cost of $4.1 million, part of a larger ongoing project to replace bridges all over the state; a temporary bridge over the West Kill allowed traffic to continue using the route during construction.

== Major intersections ==
County	Location	mi	km	Destinations	Notes
Orange	Port Jervis	0.00	0.00	US 6 / US 209 to I-84 – Port Jervis station NY 97 begins	Southern terminus; southern terminus of NY 97
Orange	Town of Deerpark	2.95	4.75	NY 97 north – Mongaup	North end of NY 97 overlap; hamlet of Sparrow Bush
Sullivan	Monticello	23.67	38.09	Future I-86 / NY 17 – New York, Binghamton	Exit 105 on NY 17
Sullivan	Town of Fallsburg	32.17	51.77	NY 52 west – Loch Sheldrake	South end of NY 52 overlap; hamlet of Woodbourne
Sullivan	Town of Fallsburg	32.44	52.21	NY 52 east – Ellenville	North end of NY 52 overlap; hamlet of Woodbourne
Sullivan	Neversink	40.66	65.44	NY 55 – Liberty, Napanoch	Northern terminus; hamlet of Grahamsville
Gap in route
Ulster	Shandaken	0.00	0.00	NY 28 – Kingston, Pine Hill	Southern terminus
Greene	Lexington	11.42	18.38	NY 23A – Stamford, Prattsville, Hunter	Northern terminus
1.000 mi = 1.609 km; 1.000 km = 0.621 mi: Concurrency terminus
