= Loch Sheldrake, New York =

Loch Sheldrake
- CDP & hamlet
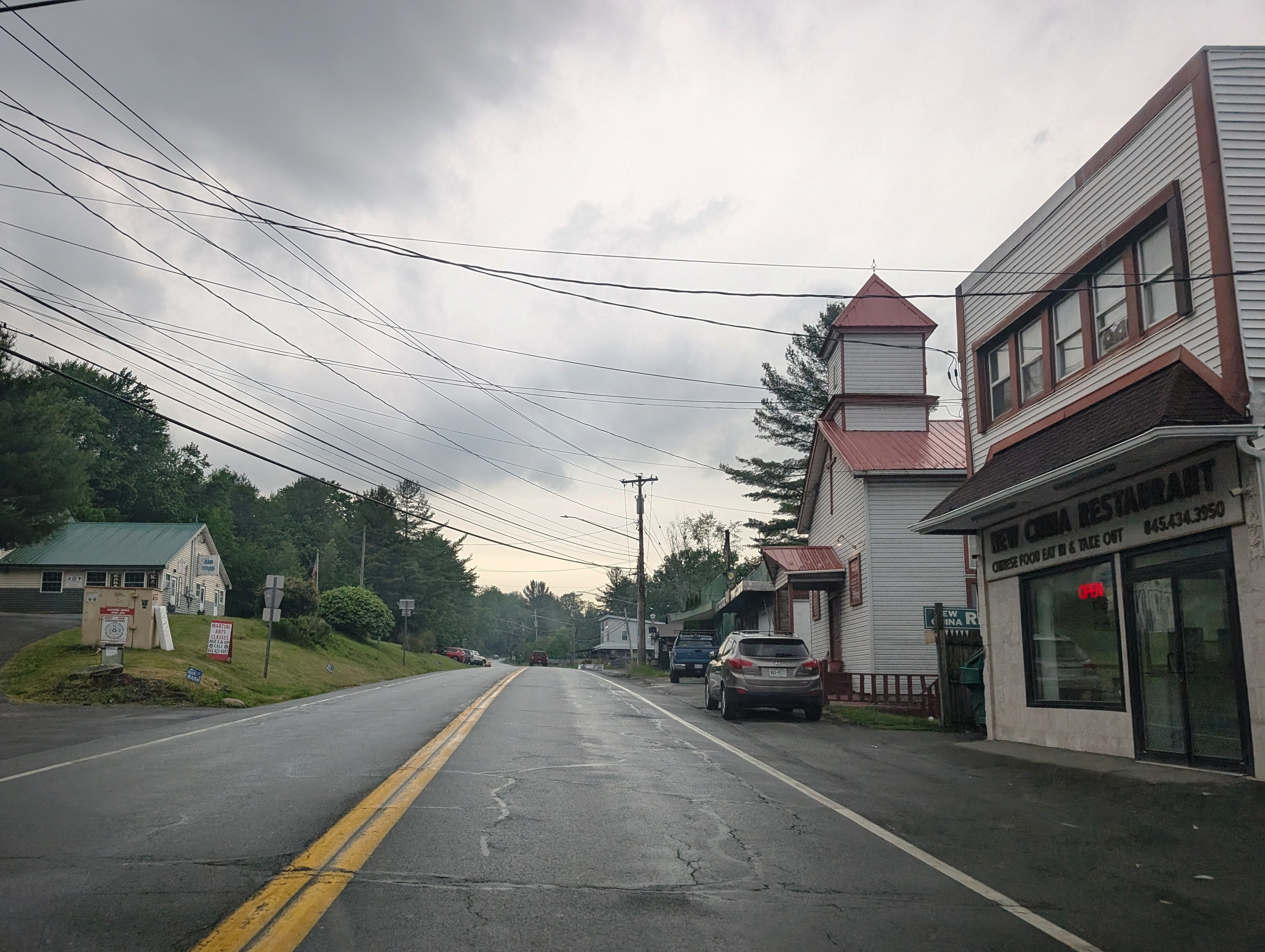
- NY 52 westbound in Loch Sheldrake

- Location of Loch Sheldrake in Sullivan County, New York
- Coordinates: 41°46′13″N 74°39′27″W
- Country: United States
- State: New York
- County: Sullivan
- Time zone: UTC-5 (Eastern (EST))
  - Summer (DST): UTC-4 (EDT)
- ZIP code: 12759

Loch Sheldrake is a hamlet and census-designated place (CDP) in the town of Fallsburg, New York, United States, in Sullivan County. The zip code for Loch Sheldrake is 12759. As of the 2020 census, Loch Sheldrake had a population of 1,025.

The community was originally named Sheldrake Pond after a deep, glacially formed pond, which forms the center of town. It is bordered by the hamlet of Hurleyville, the Town of Liberty, the hamlet of Hasbrouck, the hamlet of Divine Corners, and the hamlet of Woodbourne.

The commercial center of Loch Sheldrake is the intersection of County Route 104 and State Route 52, at the edge of Sheldrake Pond.

In its heyday as a Catskills Borscht Belt resort it was home to numerous hotels, bungalow colonies and boarding houses. Some of the best known of these were the Brown's Hotel, where comedian Jerry Lewis worked; the Evans Hotel (now a gated community called Vacation Village); and the Karmel Hotel, now Stagedoor Manor, a renowned performing arts summer camp.

It is also the home of SUNY Sullivan (formerly known as Sullivan County Community College) and the Lochmor Golf Course.

Congregation Adath Israel, the Loch Sheldrake Synagogue was listed on the National Register of Historic Places in 1997. The Synagogue is open in the summer and for the High Holidays, under the leadership of Rabbi Dr. Rashi Shapiro.

In 2012, a year-round Hasidic community was founded in Loch Sheldrake, in Town and Country Estates, with a synagogue, mikvah, a boys cheder, and a girls nursery school.

== Notable institutions ==
- Sullivan County Community College - a community college that has won several NJCAA Men's Division III Basketball Championships
- Stagedoor Manor - a performing arts summer camp

== Notable people ==
- Erich Bergen - Actor, singer, and presenter studied at the Stagedoor Manor in the town for seven years
- Francis S. Currey - birthplace of World War II Medal of Honor recipient
- Cleanthony Early - played college basketball at SUNY Sullivan and Wichita State; former NBA player for the New York Knicks from 2014 to 2016
