= Fallsburg Central School District =

School district in the U.S. state of New York

Location
- Fallsburg, New York; United States

District information
- Grades: K-12
- Superintendent: Dr. Ivan Katz
- Budget: about 36 million

Students and staff
- Students: 1,491 (2006–07)
- Teachers: 124.8 (on FTE basis)
- District mascot: Comets
- Colors: Black and Gold

Other information
- Student:teacher ratio: 11.9:1 .
- Website: www.fallsburgcsd.net

Fallsburg Central School District is a small school district located in Fallsburg, New York in Eastern Sullivan County 90 miles from New York City. The district consists of two schools: Benjamin Cosor Elementary School (BCES), and Fallsburg Junior and Senior High School. The elementary school is Kindergarten to 6. The junior and senior high school is 7-12. Originally called Fallsburgh High School, the 'h' was officially dropped by the township several decades ago.

== Scholarships and awards ==
Fallsburg Junior and Senior High school lists 46 different local scholarships and awards with various qualifying criterion which are awarded annually to deserving and worthy graduates, representing such organizations as the Lions Club, Rotary, Elks, Kiwanis, B'nai B'rith and the American Red Cross. A number of scholarships also commemorate the memory of departed teachers and students. The Samuel Beytin Fallsburg Community Scholarships, the Milton Brizel Scholarship, the Hertz-LaRuffa Scholarships, The Brian Ingber Memorial Foundation, the Provident Bank Community Involvement Scholarship, and the Scholarship For Excellence in Community Service are among the more prominent awards.

== Athletic programs ==
Fallsburg Junior and Senior High School offers boys and girls athletic programs in soccer, football, golf, tennis, volleyball, wrestling, alpine skiing, basketball, baseball, softball, cross country, track, and cheerleading at junior varsity, varsity and modified levels of competition.

== Noted graduates and instructors ==
- Gavin DeGraw, American musician and singer-songwriter.
