= Fallsburg (CDP), New York =

Fallsburg, New York
- Census-designated place
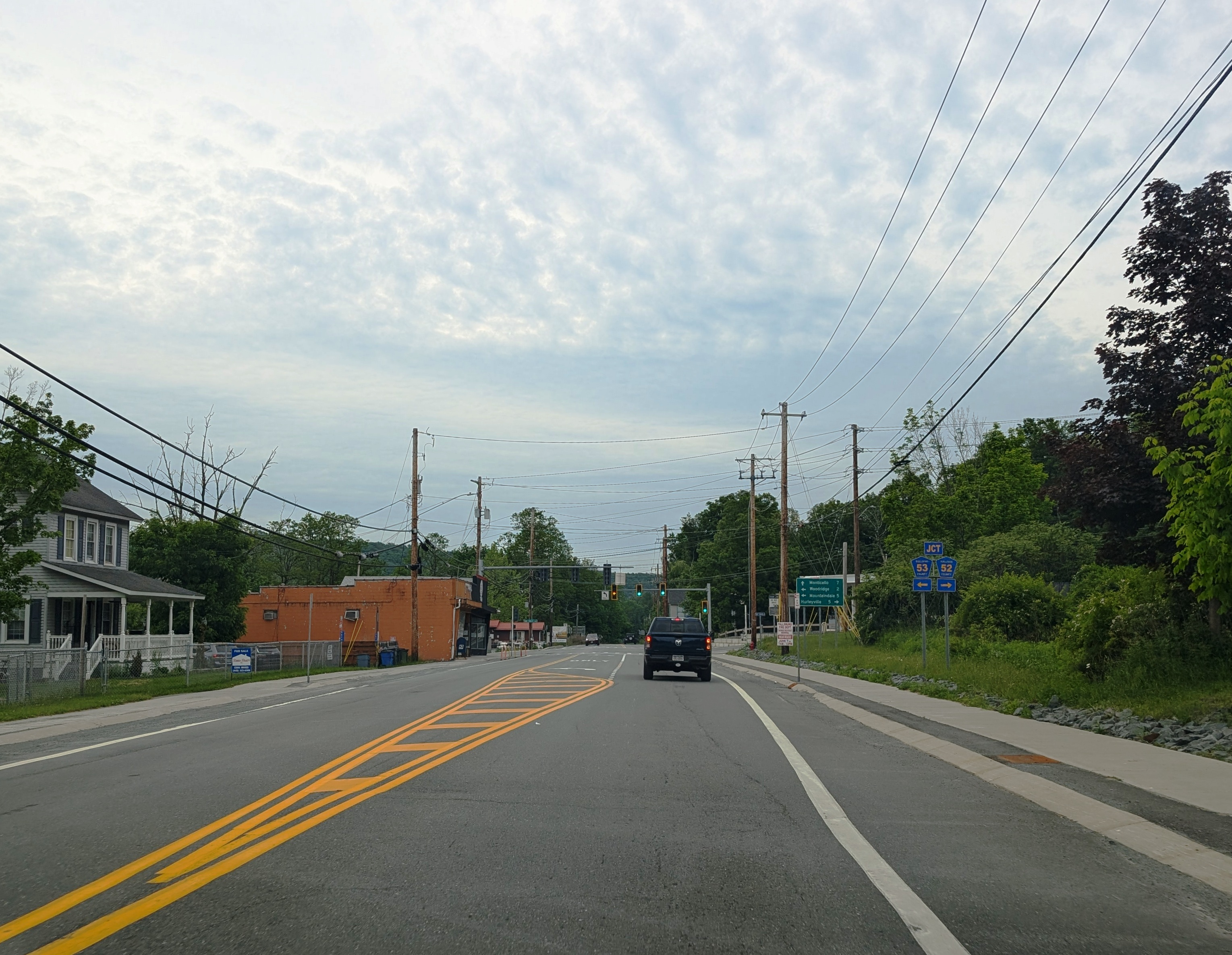
- NY 42 southbound in the hamlet of Fallsburg

- Location within New York Location within the United States
- Coordinates: 41°43′49″N 74°36′17″W
- Country: United States
- State: New York
- County: Sullivan
- Town: Fallsburg

Area
  - Total: 3.41 sq mi (8.84 km^{2})
  - Land: 3.37 sq mi (8.73 km^{2})
  - Water: 0.046 sq mi (0.12 km^{2})
- Elevation: 1,162 ft (354 m)

Population (2020)
  - Total: 1,862
  - Density: 552.5/sq mi (213.33/km^{2})
- Time zone: UTC-5 (Eastern (EST))
  - Summer (DST): UTC-4 (EDT)
- ZIP Codes: 12733 (Fallsburg); 12788 (Woodbourne); 12779 (South Fallsburg)
- Area code: 845
- FIPS code: 36-25230
- GNIS feature ID: 2806964

Fallsburg is a hamlet and census-designated place (CDP) in the town of Fallsburg in Sullivan County, New York, United States. It was first listed as a CDP prior to the 2020 census.

The community is in eastern Sullivan County, in the center of the town of Fallsburg. It is bordered to the south by South Fallsburg and to the north by Woodbourne. The Neversink River, a tributary of the Delaware River, flows from north to south through the community. New York State Route 42 passes through the community, following the west side of the Neversink. The highway leads north 2 miles (3 km) to Woodbourne and 10 miles (16 km) to Grahamsville, while to the southwest it leads 8 miles (13 km) to Monticello.

== Demographics ==
Historical population
Census	Pop.	Note	%±
2020	1,862		—
U.S. Decennial Census
