= Loch Sheldrake Synagogue =

Historic synagogue in Sullivan County, New York, United States

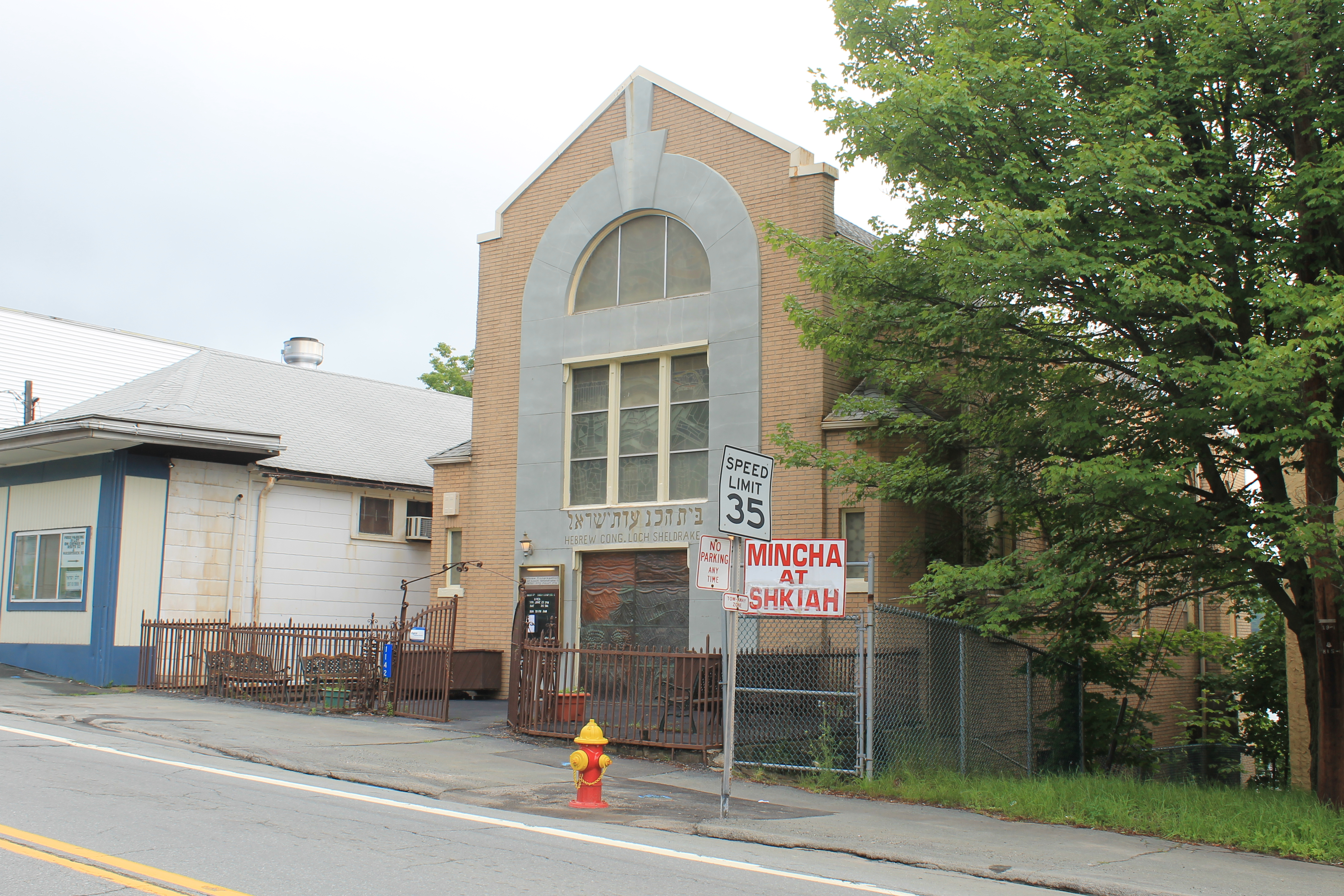
- The synagogue in 2013

- Location in New York

Religion
- Affiliation: Orthodox Judaism
- Rite: Nusach Ashkenaz
- Ecclesiastical or organizational status: Synagogue
- Leadership: Rabbi Aaron Mendel; Rabbi Dr. Rashi Shapiro (Emeritus)

Location
- Location: 1150 State Highway 52, Loch Sheldrake, Sullivan County, New York 12759
- Country: United States
- Interactive map of Loch Sheldrake Synagogue
- Coordinates: 41°46′15″N 74°39′29″W

Architecture
- Architects: Mr. Okun; John Bullock
- Type: Synagogue architecture
- Style: Late 19th and early 20th century
- Completed: 1930

Website
- hebrewcong.com
- Loch Sheldrake Synagogue
- U.S. National Register of Historic Places
- Area: less than one acre
- NRHP reference No.: 97000844
- Added to NRHP: August 12, 1997

Loch Sheldrake Synagogue, also called the Hebrew Congregation of Loch Sheldrake and officially Loch Sheldrake Adas Yisroel, is a historic Orthodox Jewish congregation and synagogue, located on NY 52, north of the junction of NY 52 and Loch Sheldrake Road in Loch Sheldrake, Sullivan County, New York, in the United States.

The synagogue was built between 1922 and 1930 of buff-colored brick on a concrete foundation, three bays wide and five bays deep. It is surmounted by a steep gable roof and features a projecting, stepped-gabled entrance pavilion with a limestone parapet.

The synagogue was added to the National Register of Historic Places in 1997.

The synagogue is open for daily prayer services in the summer and worships according to the Ashkenazi rite. The spiritual leader of the synagogue during the summer is Rabbi Rashi Shapiro.
