= County Route 149 (Sullivan County, New York) =

County route in New York

County Route 149

- Map of Sullivan County and vicinity with CR 149 highlighted in red

Route information
- Maintained by Sullivan County Highway Department
- Length: 8.69 mi (13.99 km)
- Existed: by 1995–present

Major junctions
- West end: NY 52 in Callicoon
- East end: CR 178 in Rockland

Location
- Country: United States
- State: New York
- County: Sullivan

Highway system
- County routes in New York; County Routes in Sullivan County

County Route 149 (CR 149) is a 8.69-mile (13.99 km) county route in northern Sullivan County, New York, in the United States. The route runs from an intersection with New York State Route 52 (NY 52) in the Callicoon community of Youngsville to an intersection with CR 178 in the Rockland community of Livingston Manor. CR 149 was originally designated as New York State Route 284 in 1930.

== Route description ==
CR 149 begins at an intersection with NY 52 in the community of Youngsville. The route progresses northward, passing and paralleling Tremper Road, a dead-end road. CR 149 passes by several residential homes in Youngsville, along with one local commercial building. After leaving the community, CR 149 continues to the north as Shandelee Road, passing through the residential surroundings. After passing by a few more residences, Shandelee Road makes a bend to the northwest, and into more dense woodlands in the area. About a mile north of Youngsville, CR 149 continues its way northward, passing by a local residence, and intersects with Stump Pond Road, which heads westward from the main highway. Shandelee Road makes another bend, this time to the north, passing through moderate development for about another mile. A short distance into the bend, the woodlands that were surrounding the highway clear and the highway becomes surrounded by fields and residential homes.

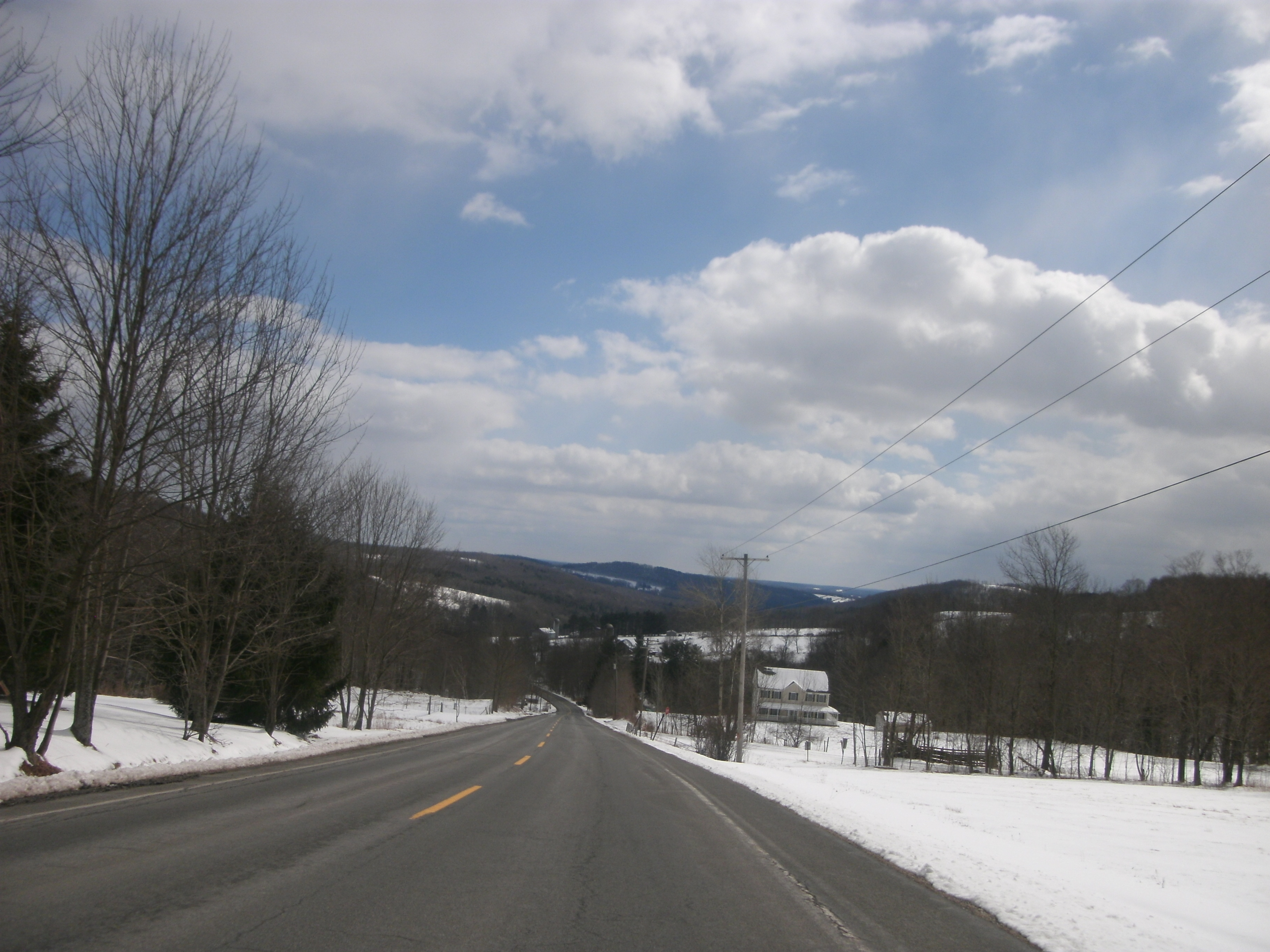
CR 149 through the town of Callicoon

After a short gap in the clearing, CR 149 intersects with Hardenburg Road, a local road, in another clearing. After Hardenburg Road, Shandelee Road begins to bend in different directions, several times to the west and several times to the east, intersecting with Meyer Road at a fork. CR 149, which continues to the left at the fork, heads to the northwest, paralleling Meyer Road to the west. The residences begin to disappear and CR 149 continues into a more wooded area, where it intersects with Whittendale Road, a local dead-end road. A short distance from Whittendale Road, CR 149 makes a sharp bend to the northeast, intersecting with the northern termini of Stump Pond Road and Meyer Road. Near the intersection with Gilda Lane, CR 149 passes the Sand Pond, and intersects with a series of short local roads. Paralleling the shores of Sand Pond for a short distance, Shandelee Road begins to enter the community of Shandelee. There, the highway intersects with Shandelee Lake Road, a short connector highway in the area. CR 149 makes a curve to the east, following Shandelee Road for a distance, making several winds in direction until the alignment turns towards the northeast. Shandelee Road continues to the northeast, passing through local woodlands and fields. As CR 149 nears Livingston Manor, the name changes from Shandelee Road to Main Street.

After a curve to the northeast, CR 149 passes under some power lines, intersecting with Cattall Road. There the highway turns to the north, and soon to the northeast, entering Livingston Manor. Immediately after entering the community, CR 149 becomes more developed, with residential homes and commercial buildings now surrounding highway. After an intersection with Creamery Road, CR 149 continues to the northeast through downtown Livingston Manor, ending at an intersection with CR 178 (a former alignment of NY 17). Interchange 96 on Route 17 (the Quickway), is not far to the north and is accessible via CR 178 and CR 81.

== History ==
New York State Route 284
- Location: Callicoon–Rockland
- Existed: 1930–c. 1939

In the 1930 renumbering of state highways in New York, the New York State Department of Public Works renumbered several routes assigned during the 1920s and assigned route numbers to hundreds of state highways that had yet to receive a designation. By May, the current alignment of CR 149, then a state highway, was designated as NY 284. The NY 284 designation was short-lived, however, as it was removed c. 1939. The former alignment of NY 284 was designated as CR 149 by the Sullivan County Highway Department by 1995. The NY 284 designation is now assigned to a road in nearby Orange County.

== Major intersections ==
The entire route is in Sullivan County.

Location	mi	km	Destinations	Notes
Youngsville	0.00	0.00	NY 52 – Jeffersonville, Liberty	
Livingston Manor	8.69	13.99	CR 178 (Old Route 17)	Former routing of NY 17
1.000 mi = 1.609 km; 1.000 km = 0.621 mi
