= Lily Halpern =

American performer and singer

- Born: Lily M. Halpern; November 30, 1991 (age 34); Boston, Massachusetts
- Years active: 2010-present

Lily M. Halpern also known by the stage name Lily Lane (born November 30, 1991) is an American performer and singer. She is best known as her second reincarnation in the entertainment industry, Lily Lane, whose debut 2014 EP "Nothin' But Trouble" gained critical acclaim and was featured on the abc family hit show Pretty Little Liars. As Lily Halpern, she is best known for her viral video of Nicki Minaj's song "Starships", her hit song "Wishlist", and for being an opening act for Big Time Rush on their nationwide tour (Fall 2011), In 2012, her original cover video of Nicki Minaj's song "Starships" went viral on YouTube and surpassed a million views in a few short weeks.

== Early life ==
Lily began dancing, singing, modeling, and acting at a young age. Born in Boston, Massachusetts, sang at the Longy School of Music and Berklee College of Music, modeled with Dynasty Models and Talent, and acted at her elementary school. She also spent summers at Stagedoor Manor, a performing arts summer camp. She attended The Park School, an independent day school, from 1997–2004, and Milton Academy, a prestigious preparatory school, from 2004-2010. She graduated Milton Academy in the spring of 2010, and moved to New York City to pursue her music career. Halpern has two older brothers, Ian and Grammy nominated Tucker, who participated in a parody video of Lily's first single "Not Gonna Cry."

== Career ==
Halpern moved to New York City to pursue her music career in the summer of 2010. She released her EP "Not Gonna Cry" which was produced by Alex Cantrall (JoJo, Vanessa Hudgens, Nicole Scherzinger). In March 2011, Lily released her music video for "Wishlist" which was directed by Shalin Sharman (Kanye West) and featured internet celebrity Megan Parken. The video was shot at famous landmarks in New York including Coney Island's Boardwalk, and featured fashions from designer Tory Burch. In the spring of 2011 Lily opened for the leg of Australian pop star Cody Simpson's "Waiting4U Tour" featuring Greyson Chance. Lily performed songs from her EP. Halpern then filmed two music videos in the summer of 2011, one for the first single from her full-length album "Colors". The "Colors" video features television star Grey Damon of abc family's The Nine Lives of Chloe King. In August 2011, Halpern started touring with Big Time Rush and Hot Chelle Rae on their nationwide tour. Her first show on the BTR tour was in her hometown of Boston, MA at the Boston House of Blues. In 2012, Halpern released a song called "Forget What They Say" in an effort to raise awareness of cyber bullying and speak out against the cyber bullies that attacked her after rumors circulated in March 2012 that she was dating popular boy band member Harry Styles of One Direction. In April 2012, Halpern released a cover video of "Starships" by Nicki Minaj featuring her rapping for the first time. The video was entered in Perez Hilton's "Can You Sing Competition" and she was named one of the winners. In weeks the video surpassed the number of views any of the other videos on the competition received and in two months the video passed 1,000,000 views, being the first of Halperns videos to reach a million. June 2012, Lily returned to her hometown and performed four songs at radio station Kiss 108's Summer Kiss Concert at the Comcast Center in Boston, MA. She shared the stage at Kiss Concert with acts such as The Wanted, Enrique Iglesias, Flo Rida, Karmin, JoJo, and Gym Class Heroes.

After proving herself as a teen pop entertainer, Halpern took a hiatus from music and attended NYU's Tisch School of the Arts and enrolled in the Clive Davis Institute of Recorded Music. At college, she reinvented herself with a new more mature retro-inspired sound. When Halpern released her next EP in 2014, she did so under her new moniker, "Lily Lane". Lane’s first independent EP "Nothin’ But Trouble", released in 2014 was music featured numerous times in the most popular teen television show in the country, ABC family’s "Pretty Little Liars".

== Discography ==
- Not Gonna Cry - EP (2010)
- Nothin' But Trouble - EP (2014)

Singles

Year	Title
2011	"Not Gonna Cry"
2011	"Wishlist"
2011	"Colors"
2012	"Forget What They Say"
2014	"Nothin' But Trouble"
