= Francis S. Currey =

United States Army Medal of Honor recipient (1925–2019)

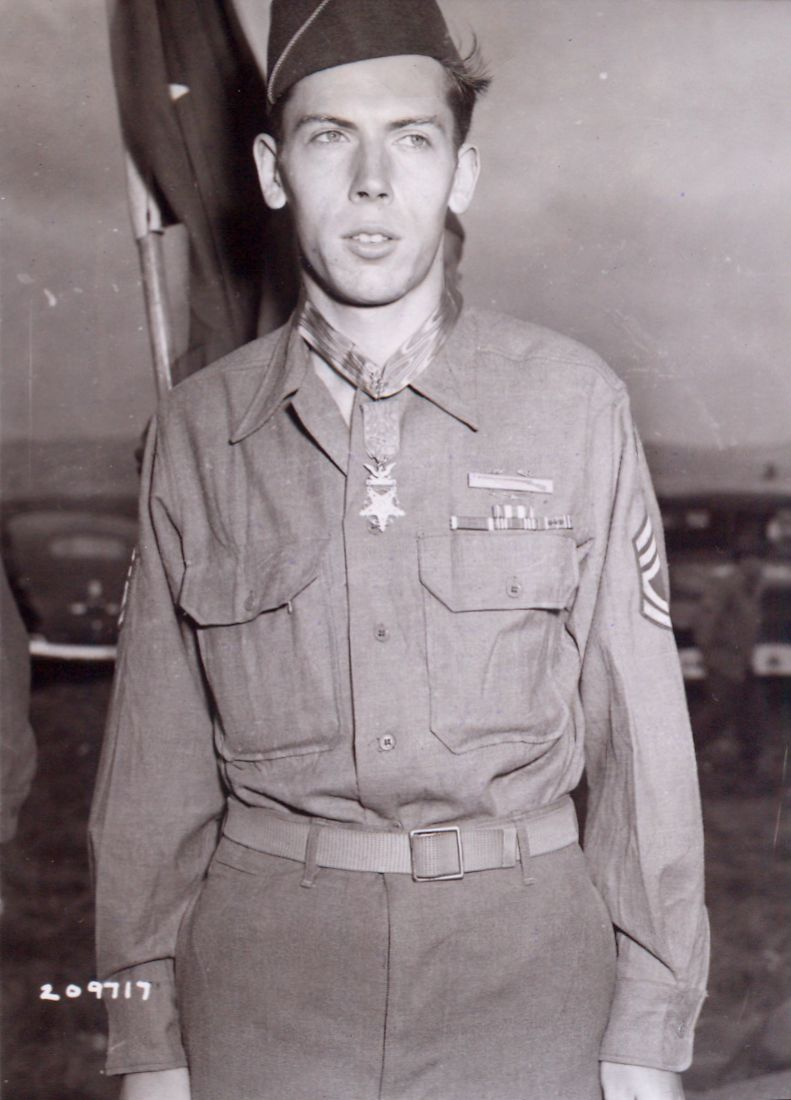
- Currey wearing his Medal of Honor in 1945
- Born: June 29, 1925; Loch Sheldrake, New York
- Died: October 8, 2019 (aged 94); Selkirk, New York
- Burial place: Mount Pleasant Cemetery; South Bethlehem, New York
- Military career
- Allegiance: United States
- Branch: United States Army
- Service years: 1943–1945
- Rank: Technical Sergeant
- Units: Company K, 3rd Battalion, 120th Infantry Regiment
- Conflicts: World War II: Battle of the Bulge
- Awards: Medal of Honor; Silver Star; Bronze Star Medal; Purple Heart (3); Order of Leopold (Belgium)

Francis Sherman Currey (June 29, 1925 – October 8, 2019) was a United States Army technical sergeant and a recipient of the United States military's highest decoration for valor, the Medal of Honor, for his heroic actions during the Battle of the Bulge in World War II.

== Early life ==
Currey was born in Loch Sheldrake, New York, on June 29, 1925. After being orphaned at age 12, he was raised by foster parents on a farm in nearby Hurleyville. He joined the United States Army at age 17, one week after graduating Hurleyville High School. Although at only 18 years old he completed Officer Candidate School, his superiors felt that he was "too immature" to be an officer and denied him a commission.

== World War II ==
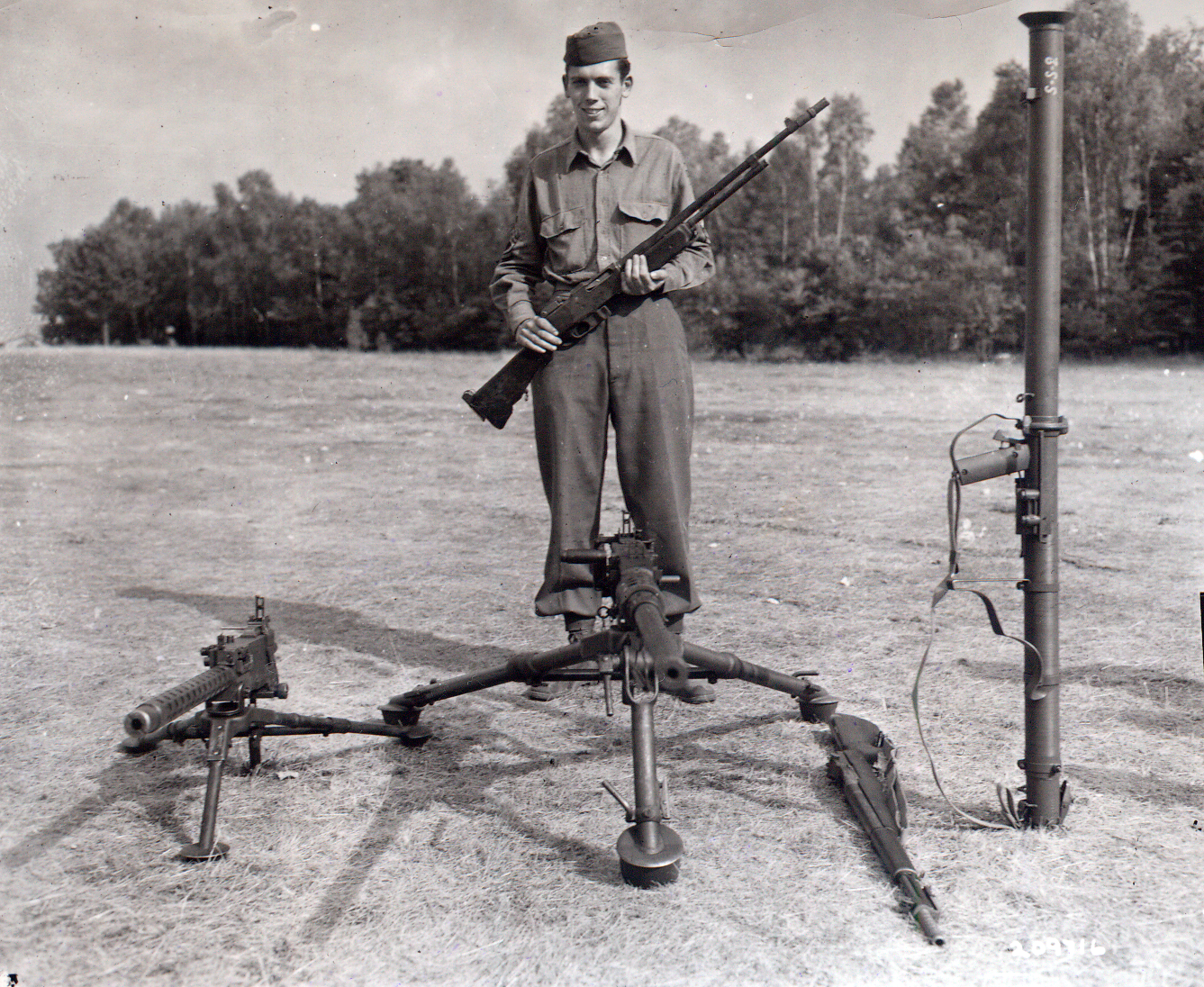
T/Sgt Currey used these weapons while halting a German attack on his company during the Battle of the Bulge

30th Infantry Division shoulder sleeve insignia

Currey landed at Omaha Beach in July 1944, a few weeks after D-Day. On 18 October, he was assigned as a replacement without winter gear (he later suffered from frostbite) to 3rd Platoon, K Company, 120th Infantry Regiment, 30th Infantry Division, at Herzogenrath, Germany. He saw his first combat action that month. Six weeks later, he was a sergeant and 3rd Platoon Leader in K Company. On December 21, 1944, Private First Class Currey was an automatic rifleman in a rifle squad which was guarding a bridge crossing and strongpoint. He repeatedly exposed himself to hostile fire while firing upon and killing several German infantrymen during an early morning German tank advance in Malmedy, Belgium. During the attack, he used a bazooka and anti-tank grenades which caused four enemy tank crews to abandon their tanks and also enabled him to rescue five comrades who had been pinned down in a building by enemy fire. After the Battle of the Bulge, he became a squad leader, and was awarded the Silver Star for gallantry in action at his regiment's command post.

In March 1945, Currey's company commander recommended him for the Medal of Honor for his actions on December 21. The Medal of Honor was presented to Currey on July 27, 1945, by the 30th Infantry Division division commander, Major General Leland Hobbs, near Reims, France; the medal was officially awarded to him on August 17, 1945. After the war was over in Europe, he received his third Purple Heart for being shot in Bavaria while disarming German soldiers. After occupational duty and a stop in England he returned to the United States in August as a first sergeant aboard the Queen Mary.

== Later life ==
Currey worked as a counselor at the Veterans Affairs Medical Center in Albany, New York, from 1950 until he retired as a supervisor in 1980. After he retired from Veterans Affairs, he started and ran a landscaping business. He also worked at a hotel booking conventions in Myrtle Beach, South Carolina, until 2002.

Currey died on October 8, 2019, in Selkirk, New York.

== Military awards ==
Currey's military awards and decorations:

Combat Infantry Badge
	Medal of Honor	
Silver Star	Bronze Star Medal	Purple Heart with two Bronze Oak Leaf Clusters
Army Good Conduct Medal	American Campaign Medal	European Campaign Medal with three 3/16" bronze stars
World War II Victory Medal	Army of Occupation Medal	Belgium Order of Leopold

Army Meritorious Unit Commendation with one bronze oak leaf cluster

== Medal of Honor citation ==
Currey's official Medal of Honor citation reads:

Rank and organization: Sergeant, U.S. Army, Company K, 120th Infantry, 30th Infantry Division
Place and date: Malmedy, Belgium, December 21, 1944
Entered service at: Hurleyville, N.Y.
Birth: Loch Sheldrake, N.Y.
G.O. No. 69, August 17, 1945

He was an automatic rifleman with the 3rd Platoon defending a strong point near Malmedy, Belgium, on 21 December 1944, when the enemy launched a powerful attack. Overrunning tank destroyers and antitank guns located near the strong point, German tanks advanced to the 3rd Platoon's position, and, after prolonged fighting, forced the withdrawal of this group to a nearby factory. Sgt. Currey found a bazooka in the building and crossed the street to secure rockets meanwhile enduring intense fire from enemy tanks and hostile infantrymen who had taken up a position at a house a short distance away. In the face of small-arms, machinegun, and artillery fire, he, with a companion, knocked out a tank with 1 shot. Moving to another position, he observed 3 Germans in the doorway of an enemy-held house. He killed or wounded all 3 with his automatic rifle. He emerged from cover and advanced alone to within 50 yards of the house, intent on wrecking it with rockets. Covered by friendly fire, he stood erect, and fired a shot which knocked down half of 1 wall. While in this forward position, he observed 5 Americans who had been pinned down for hours by fire from the house and 3 tanks. Realizing that they could not escape until the enemy tank and infantry guns had been silenced, Sgt. Currey crossed the street to a vehicle, where he procured an armful of antitank grenades. These he launched while under heavy enemy fire, driving the tankmen from the vehicles into the house. He then climbed onto a half-track in full view of the Germans and fired a machinegun at the house. Once again changing his position, he manned another machine gun whose crew had been killed; under his covering fire the 5 soldiers were able to retire to safety. Deprived of tanks and with heavy infantry casualties, the enemy was forced to withdraw. Through his extensive knowledge of weapons and by his heroic and repeated braving of murderous enemy fire, Sgt. Currey was greatly responsible for inflicting heavy losses in men and material on the enemy, for rescuing 5 comrades, 2 of whom were wounded, and for stemming an attack which threatened to flank his battalion's position.

== Other honors ==
- Currey Ave in South Bethlehem, NY is from his last name.
- In 1998, the first Medal of Honor G.I. Joe action figure was modeled after Currey.
- In 2006, Currey became a member of the New York State Senate Veterans' Hall of Fame.
- In 2013, an outside mural of Currey was unveiled in his honor as a living Medal of Honor recipient at the Sullivan Country Museum in Hurleyville.
- In November 2013, Currey's photo was one of 12 photos of Medal of Honor recipients on the cover sheet of a U.S. Postal Service "World War II Medal of Honor Forever Stamp" packet of 20 Medal of Honor stamps.

== See also ==
- List of Medal of Honor recipients for World War II
