= Stagedoor Manor =

Performing arts training center in New York (state)

Coordinates: 41°46′13″N 74°39′27″W

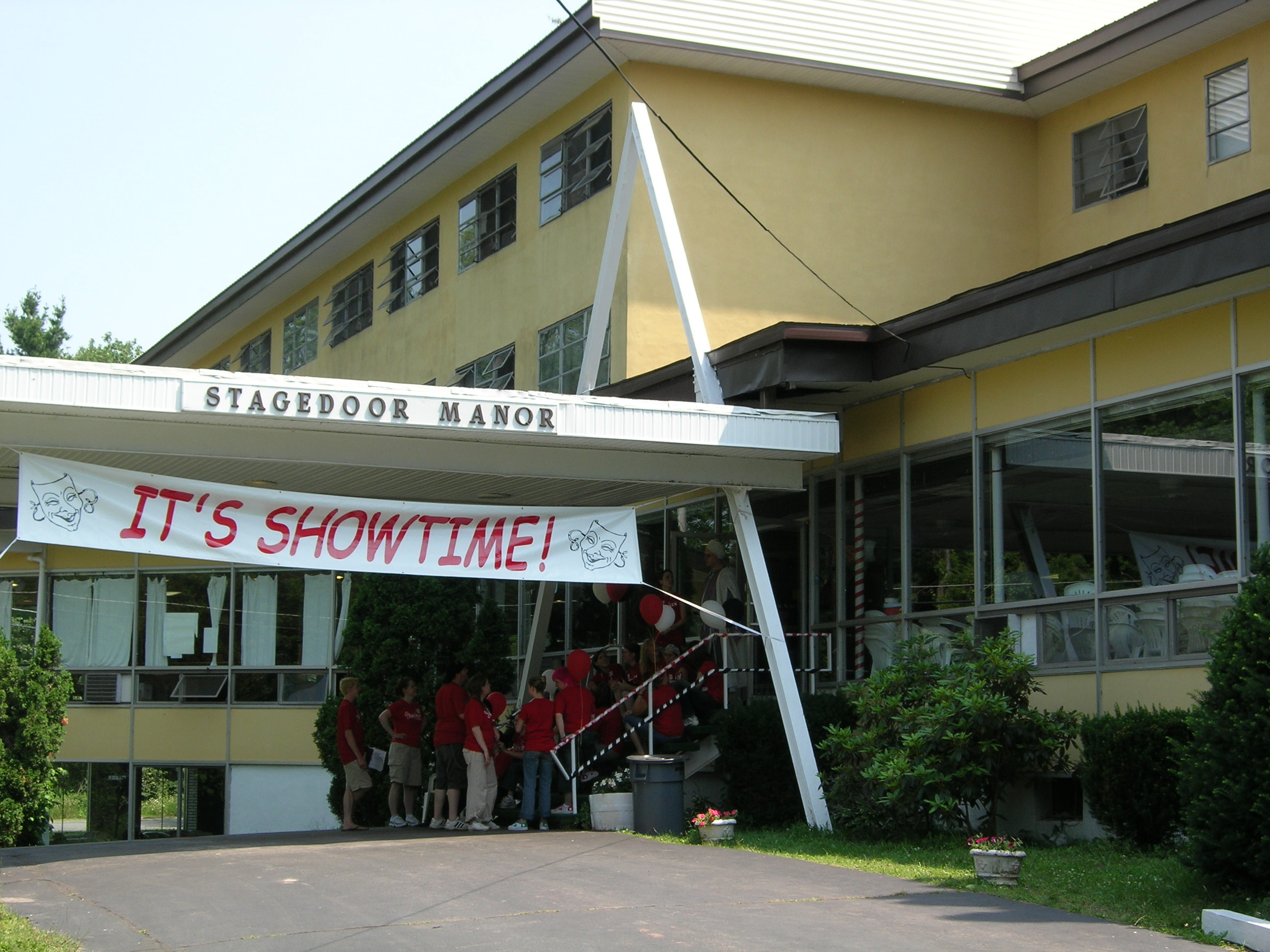
Stagedoor Manor (Summer 2006)

Stagedoor Manor is a performing arts training center located in Loch Sheldrake, New York. Since its opening, it has trained thousands of young actors, many of whom have gone on to success in film, television, and theater.

Stagedoor Manor is located in a former Catskills Borscht Belt resort (Karmel Hotel) in Loch Sheldrake, New York, that was redesigned in the 1970s. The camp consists of a variety of theatre spaces, including the Carousel, the Cabaret, the Forum, the Merman, and the outdoor Garden Theatre. The four largest theaters are the 350-seat Carl and Elsie Samuelson Theatre, the 250-seat Jack Romano Playhouse, the Oasis Theatre (a theatre-in-the-round), and the new Forum Theatre.

== Format ==
Each summer, Stagedoor Manor holds three three-week-long sessions that start in late June and end in late August. Approximately 280 campers, ranging in age from 10 to 18, attend each session. Over each summer, the 170+ staff collaborate with the producers to mount 42 fully realized productions in their 8 onsite venues (3 proscenium theaters, a theater in the round, 2 black boxes, a cabaret style space and a natural outdoor amphitheater). During each three-week session, the camp produces 9 musicals, 5 plays, Dramafest (a one-act playwrighting competition), and two unique cabaret performances (the Our Time Cabaret and Player's Ensemble).

The program's impact on the careers and networking of child actors was described by film director Shawn Levy in the June 15, 2007, edition of The New York Post: "If someone plays that Stagedoor card, it's like whispering the location of a party with a secret location...I could sing you that song from the camp's yearly cabaret, and that's the equivalent of the secret handshake."

== Productions ==
Stagedoor Manor has a series of productions done in partnership with Music Theatre International (MTI), the American Theatre Wing, and other Broadway producers and composers. In 2004, Stagedoor produced Richard Maltby Jr. and David Shire's Starting Here, Starting Now. Maltby and Shire conducted a special workshop with the cast during the rehearsal period and also attended the opening night performance. This revue was performed again in 2013 along with two other Maltby musicals, Big: the musical and Miss Saigon under Maltby's supervision. The production of Miss Saigon was covered by Broadway.com. In 2006, Stagedoor produced the world-premiere of Disney's High School Musical. In 2007, Stagedoor produced special workshop productions of Avenue Q and RENT in partnership with MTI. In 2008, in partnership with the composer, Stagedoor produced Andrew Lippa's The Wild Party. Later that summer, Stagedoor became the first non-Equity stage to produce Mel Brooks' The Producers. Stagedoor Manor regularly partners with MTI and has done workshop productions (for School Editions) of Aida, Miss Saigon, Avenue Q, RENT, Sweeney Todd, and The Wild Party. In 2012, Stagedoor presented Macy's new musical, "Yes, Virginia." In 1999, Stagedoor Manor staged their own version of the original version of Carrie - The Musical, despite the fact that amateur performing rights were not released for the show at the time. Composer Michael Gore and book-writer Larry Cohen attended one of the performances.

== Media ==
Stagedoor Manor served as the inspiration for the 2003 independent film Camp, written and directed by Stagedoor alumnus Todd Graff. In 2006, Stagedoor was the subject of a documentary by Alexandra Shiva. In 2010, GQ author Mickey Rapkin wrote the book Theatre Geek: The Real Life Drama of a Summer at Stagedoor Manor, which described the camp's history as it followed the story of several campers through their summer experiences.

== Notable alumni ==
- Adam F. Goldberg
- Adam Pascal
- Adrienne Shelly
- Alexander Chaplin
- Amanda Aday
- Amy Ryan
- Ansel Elgort
- Beanie Feldstein
- Bijou Phillips
- Bryce Dallas Howard
- Brett Davern
- Cole Hauser
- David Quinn
- Erich Bergen
- Fred Melamed
- Gordon Greenberg
- Helen Slater
- Jason Wise
- Jeanine Tesori
- Jeff Blumenkrantz
- Jeff Ward
- Jeffrey Sharp
- Jennifer Jason Leigh
- Jon Cryer
- Jonathan Lovitz
- Jonathan Marc Sherman
- Josh Charles
- Julia Murney
- Lea Michele
- Lily Halpern
- Mandy Moore
- Mary Stuart Masterson
- Mia Tyler
- Michael Ian Black
- Michelle Federer
- Molly Brown
- Natalie Portman
- Nicky Silver
- Rachel Chavkin
- Randy Harrison
- Robert Downey Jr.
- Sebastian Stan
- Shaina Taub
- Shawn Levy
- Skylar Astin
- Todd Graff
- Yancey Arias
- Zach Braff
