= List of county routes in Sullivan County, New York =

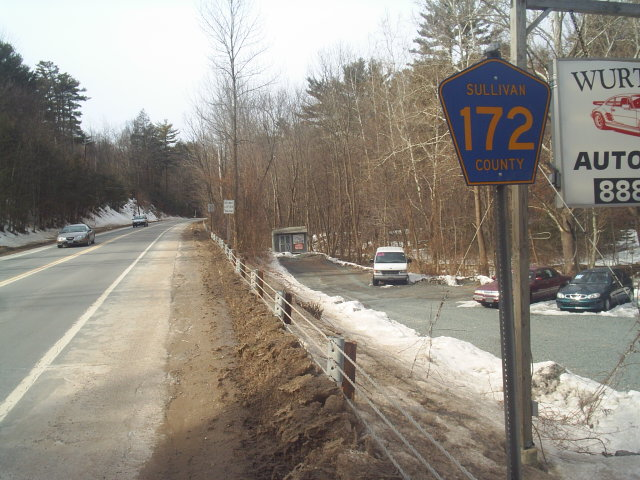
- CR 172 passing a local auto body shop in Wurtsboro

Highway names
- Interstates: Interstate X (I-X)
- US Highways: U.S. Route X (US X)
- State: New York State Route X (NY X)
- County: County Route X (CR X)

System links
- New York Highways; Interstate; US; State; Reference; Parkways

County routes in Sullivan County, New York, are maintained by the Sullivan County Division of Public Works and signed with the Manual on Uniform Traffic Control Devices-standard yellow-on-blue pentagon route marker. The county highway system comprises roughly 140 routes arranged across the county in groups of nine. For the most part, state routes in Sullivan County are county-maintained and co-signed with county routes. However, the converse is not true; that is, not all county routes overlap state routes for their entire length. Typically, each series consists of county routes along a single roadway, often overlapping with state highways in the process. The lowest numbered route in the system is County Route 11 (CR 11); the highest is CR 183C. Note that routes 160 through 169 do not conform to any style, and coincidentally the 170 through 179 series (with the exception of the spur designated 174A) follows the pre-expressway routing of New York State Route 17 (NY 17).

Sullivan County posted signage of their routes in 1958.

== Routes 1–50 ==
=== Barryville to Claryville (11–19) ===
The Barryville to Claryville series encompasses routes 11 through 17 and CR 19, the non-suffixed of which form a mostly continuous roadway between the two communities. Most of the routes are concurrent to NY 55, which follows the Barryville–Claryville route from Barryville north to Curry. At Curry, CR 19 splits from NY 55 to access Claryville. The Barryville–Claryville route is interrupted four times by three state-maintained stretches of NY 55 (from CR 13 to CR 14; from CR 16 to CR 17; and from CR 17 to CR 19) and a locally maintained section within the village of Liberty.

Route list

Route	Length (mi)	Length (km)	From	Via	To	Notes
CR 11	3.81	6.13	NY 97	Brook Road in Highland	CR 12 at Eldred Street	Entire length overlaps with NY 55
CR 11A	0.64	1.03	NY 97	River Road in Highland	Dead end near NY 55 / NY 97 junction	
CR 12	7.38	11.88	CR 11 at Eldred Street in Highland	Board Road	CR 13 / CR 26 in Bethel	Entire length overlaps with NY 55
CR 13	4.07	6.55	CR 12 / CR 26	White Lake Road in Bethel	NY 17B	Entire length overlaps with NY 55
CR 14	6.29	10.12	NY 17B	Swan Lake Road in Bethel	Liberty town line	Entire length overlaps with NY 55
CR 15	3.59	5.78	Bethel town line	Liberty Road in Liberty	Liberty village line	Entire length overlaps with NY 55
CR 16	3.92	6.31	Liberty village line in Liberty	Neversink Road	Aden Road in Neversink	Entire length overlaps with NY 55
CR 17	2.30	3.70	Wilson Shields Road	Neversink Road in Neversink	Wagners Road	Entire length overlaps with NY 55
CR 19	5.28	8.50	NY 55	Claryville Road in Neversink	Ulster County line	Part south of CR 157 was formerly part of NY 42

=== Barryville to Narrowsburg (21–26) ===
The Barryville to Narrowsburg series encompasses routes 21 through 26. CR 21, CR 22, and CR 23 form a continuous roadway north to an intersection with NY 97 near Narrowsburg, while CR 24 follows two county-maintained sections of NY 52 in the town of Tusten. The remaining routes are assigned to various connectors in the towns of Tusten and Highland.

Route list

Route	Length (mi)	Length (km)	From	Via	To	Notes
CR 21	3.83	6.16	NY 97	Barryville–Yulan Road	CR 22 / CR 33	
CR 21A	0.09	0.14	NY 97	River Road in Highland	CR 21	
CR 22	4.32	6.95	CR 21 / CR 33 in Highland	Beaver Brook Road	CR 23 / CR 26 in Tusten	
CR 23	3.87	6.23	NY 97	Lumberland–Mount Hope Road in Tusten	CR 22 / CR 26	
CR 24	4.15	6.68	Main Street	Bridge Street and Narrowsburg Road in Tusten	CR 111 at Cochecton town line	Entire length overlaps with NY 52; discontinuous at NY 97
CR 25	1.39	2.24	NY 97	Eckes Road in Tusten	NY 52 / CR 24	
CR 26	6.25	10.06	CR 22 / CR 23 in Tusten	Crystal Lake Road	NY 55 / CR 13 in Bethel	

=== Mongaup to Yulan (31–33) ===
The Mongaup to Yulan series is only CR 31 through CR 33, as routes 34 through 39 do not currently exist within the county. The roadway begins as CR 31 at NY 97 in Mongaup and heads northwest to a junction with CR 21 and CR 22 in Yulan. CR 31 and CR 32 do not directly intersect each other; instead, they are connected by the northernmost portion of CR 41.

Route list

Route	Length (mi)	Length (km)	From	Via	To	Notes
CR 31	5.28	8.50	NY 97	Upper Mongaup Road in Lumberland	CR 41	
CR 32	5.14	8.27	NY 55 / CR 12 / CR 33 in Highland	Proctor Road	CR 41 / CR 42 in Lumberland	
CR 33	2.82	4.54	CR 21 / CR 22	Eldred–Yulan Road in Highland	NY 55 / CR 12 / CR 32	

=== Pond Eddy to Monticello (41–49) ===
The Pond Eddy to Monticello series is made up of CR 41 through CR 45 and CR 47 through CR 49, including CR 45A. The Pond Eddy–Monticello roadway begins at NY 97 in Pond Eddy and progresses north as CR 41 through CR 45, from south to north, to a terminus at NY 42 south of Monticello. CR 47 is a spur off CR 32 from Eldred to Highland Lake. The route itself does not connect to any other route in the Pond Eddy-Monticello series; however, the unnumbered Mohican Lake Road continues east from the eastern terminus of CR 47 to intersect CR 42 near Glen Spey. The remaining routes are spurs off the main Pond Eddy–Monticello route.

Route list

Route	Length (mi)	Length (km)	From	Via	To	Notes
CR 41	2.92	4.70	Pennsylvania state line	High Road in Lumberland	CR 32 / CR 42	
CR 42	3.31	5.33	CR 32 / CR 41	Forestburgh Road in Lumberland	CR 43 at Leers Road	
CR 43	5.05	8.13	CR 42 at Leers Road in Lumberland	Forestburgh Road	NY 42 / CR 48 in Forestburgh	
CR 44	3.48	5.60	CR 43	Plank and Sackett Lake roads in Forestburgh	CR 45 at Thompson town line	
CR 45	3.97	6.39	CR 44 at Forestburgh town line	Sackett Lake Road in Thompson	NY 42	
CR 45A	0.10	0.16	CR 45	Sackett Lake Road in Thompson	NY 42	
CR 47	2.03	3.27	CR 32	Highland Lake Road in Highland	Lakeview Drive	
CR 48	3.71	5.97	NY 42 / CR 43	Hartwood Road in Forestburgh	CR 49 / CR 101	
CR 49	3.45	5.55	Orange County line (becomes CR 7)	Oakland Valley Road in Forestburgh	CR 48 / CR 101	

== Routes 51–100 ==
=== Liberty to Spring Glen (51–59) ===
The Liberty to Spring Glen series consists of routes 51 through 59. Routes 51 through 55 follow a single roadway across eastern Sullivan County from Liberty to the Ulster County line, with a brief gap between CR 53 and CR 54 in Woodridge. In Ulster County, the road continues as the short CR 80, terminating at US 209 in Spring Glen. CR 59 is a connector between NY 17B and CR 174 near Monticello and does not connect to any other route in the Liberty-Spring Glen series. The remaining routes are connectors in the vicinity of Woodridge.

Route list

Route	Length (mi)	Length (km)	From	Via	To	Notes
CR 51	2.13	3.43	NY 52	Hilldale Road in Fallsburg	CR 52 / CR 104	
CR 52	3.49	5.62	CR 51 / CR 104	Brickman Road in Fallsburg	NY 42 / CR 53	
CR 53	2.03	3.27	Roosevelt Avenue	Old Falls Road in Fallsburg	NY 42 / CR 52	
CR 54	1.65	2.66	0.13 miles (0.21 km) west of Woodridge east village line	Mountaindale Road	CR 55 / CR 56 in Fallsburg	
CR 55	6.59	10.61	CR 54 / CR 56 in Fallsburg	Main Street and Mountaindale Road	Ulster County line in Mamakating (becomes CH 80)	
CR 56	7.52	12.10	CR 172 in Mamakating	Masten Lake Road	CR 54 / CR 55 in Fallsburg	
CR 58	5.67	9.12	Rock Hill Drive at NY 17 exit 109 in Thompson	Glen Wild Road	Woodridge village line in Fallsburg	
CR 59	1.10	1.77	NY 17B	Kaufman Road in Thompson	NY 17 eastbound on-ramp	

=== New Vernon to Burlingham (61–66) ===
The New Vernon to Burlingham series consists of routes 61–65. CR 62 (Winterton Road) runs from the Orange County line near New Vernon to the village of Bloomingburg, where it connects to the village-maintained South Road. The road changes names to North Road at Main Street, and county maintenance of the highway resumes at the north village line as CR 61. It heads northeast from the village as Burlingham Road to the Ulster County line. The other four routes in the series are spurs off the primary New Vernon–Burlingham highway.

Route list

Route	Length (mi)	Length (km)	From	Via	To	Notes
CR 61	5.02	8.08	Bloomingburg village line	Burlingham Road in Mamakating	Ulster County line (becomes CR 7)	
CR 62	4.18	6.73	Orange County line (becomes CR 18)	Winterton Road in Mamakating	Bloomingburg village line	
CR 63	0.47	0.76	CR 62	Camp Bell Road in Mamakating	Orange County line	Once crossed Shawangunk Kill to connect to Hubbard Road
CR 64	0.51	0.82	CR 65	Spruce Road in Mamakating	Orange County line	
CR 65	1.84	2.96	Orange County line (becomes CR 90)	Upper Road in Mamakating	CR 62	
CR 66	0.36	0.58	CR 61	Hamilton Road in Mamakating	Orange County line (becomes CR 48)	

=== Mongaup Valley to Liberty (71–75) ===
The route from Mongaup Valley to Liberty comprises routes 71 through 75, with routes 71 through 73 serving as the primary roadway between the hamlet of Mongaup Valley and the village of Liberty. CR 74 and CR 75 are spurs leading away from the main route.

Route list

Route	Length (mi)	Length (km)	From	Via	To	Notes
CR 71	1.78	2.86	NY 55 / CR 15	Ferndale Road in Liberty	NY 17 exit 101 / CR 175	
CR 72	1.88	3.03	CR 73 / CR 74	Lt. J.G. Brender Highway in Liberty	CR 71	
CR 73	4.23	6.81	Gale Road in Bethel	Lt. J.G. Brender Highway	CR 72 / CR 74 in Liberty	
CR 74	1.59	2.56	NY 55 / CR 14 / CR 15	Stanton Corners Road in Liberty	CR 72 / CR 73	
CR 75	2.11	3.40	CR 174 in Thompson	Harris–Bushville Road	CR 73 in Bethel	

=== Livingston Manor to Parksville (81–85) ===
The Livingston Manor–Parksville series comprises routes 81 through 85, which form a discontinuous, circuitous route between the two communities via Catskill Park. Routes 81 through 83 lead east from Livingston Manor to the hamlet of Debruce while CR 84 and CR 85 head northeast from Parksville to the community of Willowemoc. Debruce (CR 83) and Willowemoc (CR 84) are connected by a town road named Willowemoc Road.

Route list

Route	Length (mi)	Length (km)	From	Via	To	Notes
CR 81	2.46	3.96	CR 178	Debruce Road in Rockland	CR 82	
CR 82	3.41	5.49	CR 81	Debruce Road in Rockland	CR 83	
CR 83	0.27	0.43	CR 82	Debruce Road in Rockland	Willowemoc Road	
CR 84	3.68	5.92	CR 85 at Cooley Mountain Road in Liberty	Cooley and Parksville roads	Willowemoc Road in Neversink	
CR 85	3.57	5.75	NY 17	Cooley Road in Liberty	CR 84 at Cooley Mountain Road	

=== Hankins to Rockland (91–96) ===
The Hankins to Rockland series extends from the hamlet of Hankins adjacent to the Delaware River to the Delaware County line north of the hamlet of Roscoe. The main route comprises CR 91 through CR 94, with CR 95 and CR 96 serving as spurs off the road. CR 91 and CR 92 connect by way of CR 124 and CR 179.

Route list

Route	Length (mi)	Length (km)	From	Via	To	Notes
CR 91	1.60	2.57	CR 179 / CR 179A	Rockland Road in Rockland	Delaware County line (becomes CR 7)	Entire length overlaps with NY 206
CR 92	3.57	5.75	CR 93 / CR 96 in Fremont	Tennanah Lake Road and Riverside Drive	CR 123 / CR 124 in Rockland	
CR 93	6.56	10.56	CR 94 / CR 95	Hankins Road in Fremont	CR 92 / CR 96	
CR 94	4.42	7.11	NY 97	Hankins Road in Fremont	CR 93 / CR 95	
CR 95	4.81	7.74	CR 93 / CR 94 in Fremont	Obernburg Road	CR 121 / CR 122 in Callicoon	
CR 96	2.15	3.46	Crowley Road	Tennanah Lake Road in Fremont	CR 92 / CR 93	

== Routes 101 and up ==
=== Hartwood to Neversink (101–109) ===
The Hartwood–Neversink series comprises routes 101 through 109 and connects the hamlets of Hartwood and Neversink. The main route utilizes CR 101 through CR 105, with the remaining routes serving as spurs or connectors off the primary path.

Route list

Route	Length (mi)	Length (km)	From	Via	To	Notes
CR 101	2.69	4.33	CR 48 / CR 49	Cold Spring Road in Forestburgh	CR 102 / CR 108	
CR 102	5.66	9.11	CR 101 / CR 108 in Forestburgh	Cold Spring Road	Monticello village line in Thompson	
CR 103	4.16	6.69	NY 42	Anawana Lake Road in Thompson	CR 104 / CR 107	
CR 104	3.62	5.83	CR 103 / CR 107 in Fallsburg	Main Street and Loch Sheldrake Road	NY 52 in Thompson	
CR 105	5.49	8.84	NY 52 in Neversink	Divine Corners Road	NY 55 in Neversink	Splits into two legs at north end
CR 107	4.80	7.72	Monticello village line	Old Liberty Road in Thompson	CR 103 / CR 104	
CR 108	3.73	6.00	NY 42	Saint Josephs Road in Forestburgh	CR 101 / CR 102	
CR 109	1.42	2.29	NY 42 in Thompson	Kiamesha Lake Road	CR 161 in Fallsburg	

=== Narrowsburg to Cochecton (111–117) ===
The Narrowsburg–Cochecton series comprises routes 111 through 117, which collectively form the shape of a backward "C" between the hamlets of Narrowsburg and Cochecton. Routes 111 through 113 follow NY 52 northeast to Fosterdale, from where the road heads west to the Pennsylvania state line at Cochecton via CR 114 (the former Newburgh and Cochecton Turnpike). The remaining routes are spurs off the primary path.

Route list

Route	Length (mi)	Length (km)	From	Via	To	Notes
CR 111	1.62	2.61	CR 24 at Tusten town line	Narrowsburg Road	CR 112 / CR 115 in Cochecton	Entire length overlaps with NY 52
CR 112	2.25	3.62	CR 111 / CR 115	Narrowsburg Road in Cochecton	CR 113 / CR 116	Entire length overlaps with NY 52
CR 113	2.28	3.67	CR 112 / CR 116	Narrowsburg Road in Cochecton	NY 17B / CR 114	Entire length overlaps with NY 52
CR 114	5.42	8.72	Pennsylvania state line on Cochecton–Damascus Bridge (becomes PA 371)	Newburgh and Cochecton Turnpike in Cochecton	NY 17B / NY 52 / CR 113	Discontinuous at NY 97
CR 115	5.55	8.93	NY 52 / CR 111 / CR 112 in Cochecton	Odell Road	NY 17B in Bethel	
CR 116	3.30	5.31	NY 97	Lake Huntington Road	NY 52 / CR 112 / CR 113	
CR 117	1.22	1.96	NY 52 in Cochecton	Mesmer Hill Road	NY 52A in Delaware	Entire length overlaps with NY 17B

=== Hortonville to Roscoe (121–128) ===
The Hortonville–Roscoe series comprises routes 121 through 128 and connects NY 17B at Hortonville (near Callicoon) to the Quickway at Roscoe. Routes 121 through 124 serve as the main north–south highway between the two points while the other routes are spurs off the primary road near the village of Jeffersonville.

Route list

Route	Length (mi)	Length (km)	From	Via	To	Notes
CR 121	4.18	6.73	NY 17B in Delaware	Hortonville Road	CR 95 / CR 122 in Callicoon	
CR 122	3.84	6.18	CR 95 / CR 121	Callicoon Center Road in Callicoon	CR 123 / CR 125	
CR 123	7.96	12.81	CR 122 / CR 125 in Callicoon	Gulf Road	CR 92 / CR 124 in Rockland	
CR 124	0.28	0.45	CR 92 / CR 123	Stewart Avenue in Rockland	NY 206 / CR 179	
CR 125	3.17	5.10	CR 127	Callicoon Center Road in Callicoon	CR 122 / CR 123	
CR 127	1.47	2.37	Jeffersonville village line	Callicoon Center Road in Callicoon	CR 125	
CR 128	3.05	4.91	NY 52 in Delaware	Jeffersonville–North Branch Road	CR 122 in Callicoon	

=== Hortonville to Basket (131–134) ===
The Hortonville–Basket series comprises routes 131 to 134. Unlike the other, lower numbered series, routes 131 to 134 only loosely connect the two locations, using parts of other roads to do so. CR 131 and CR 132 run from CR 121 north of Hortonville to NY 97 at Hankins. CR 134 begins at a junction with NY 97 about 3 miles (4.8 km) to the north and heads northeast through Basket to the Delaware County line. CR 133 and its spur do not connect to any of the other routes in the series; instead, they serve to connect NY 97 in Callicoon to the Callicoon Bridge over the Delaware River.

Route list

Route	Length (mi)	Length (km)	From	Via	To	Notes
CR 131	3.85	6.20	CR 121 in Delaware	Hankins Road	CR 132 in Fremont	
CR 132	2.66	4.28	NY 97	Hankins Road in Fremont	CR 131	
CR 133	0.22	0.35	Callicoon Bridge	Bridge and Lower Main streets in Delaware	NY 97	Includes spur to CR 133A
CR 133A	0.53	0.85	NY 97	Fremont and Upper Main streets in Delaware	NY 97	
CR 134	2.47	3.98	NY 97	Basket Road in Fremont	Delaware County line (becomes CR 28)	

=== Kauneonga Lake to Morsston (141–149) ===
The Kauneonga Lake–Morsston series comprises routes 141 through 149. The primary road between the two locations comprises CR 141, CR 143, CR 145, and CR 146, while CR 142 and CR 144 are spurs leading away from the main route. CR 149 is completely isolated from the rest of the series, running from NY 52 in the town of Callicoon to CR 178 at Livingston Manor over what was once NY 284.

Route list

Route	Length (mi)	Length (km)	From	Via	To	Notes
CR 141	6.83	10.99	NY 55 / CR 14 in Bethel	Horseshoe Lake and White Lake roads	CR 142 / CR 143 in Liberty	
CR 142	2.15	3.46	CR 141 / CR 143	Swan Lake Road in Liberty	NY 55 / CR 15	
CR 143	4.96	7.98	CR 141 / CR 142	Briscoe and White Sulphur roads in Liberty	NY 52	
CR 143A	0.05	0.08	CR 141	Briscoe Road in Liberty	CR 143	
CR 144	3.76	6.05	NY 52 in Callicoon	Briscoe Road	CR 143 in Liberty	
CR 145	2.14	3.44	NY 52	Dahlia Road in Liberty	CR 146	
CR 146	4.01	6.45	CR 145 in Liberty	Dalhia Road	CR 178 in Rockland	
CR 149	8.69	13.99	NY 52 in Callicoon	Shandelee Road and Main Street	CR 178 in Rockland	Formerly NY 284

=== Routes 151–158 ===
Unlike most numerical groupings in Sullivan County, the county routes numbered 151 through 158 do not form a continuous roadway, save for CR 151 and CR 152. However, the routes are all spurs connecting the rest of the route system to the Ulster County line.

Route list

Route	Length (mi)	Length (km)	From	Via	To	Notes
CR 151	4.32	6.95	CR 179	Beaverkill Road in Rockland	CR 152 at Campsite Road	
CR 152	3.79	6.10	CR 151 at Campsite Road	Beaverkill Road in Rockland	Ulster County line (becomes CR 54)	
CR 153	2.11	3.40	NYCDOT-maintained connection to NY 55A	Sundown Road in Neversink	Ulster County line (becomes CR 46)	
CR 154	2.31	3.72	NY 42	Ulster Heights Road in Fallsburg	Ulster County line (becomes CR 52)	
CR 156	2.95	4.75	NY 42	South Hill Road in Neversink	Ulster County line	
CR 157	0.87	1.40	CR 19	Frost Valley Road in Neversink	Ulster County line (becomes CR 47)	Formerly part of NY 42
CR 158	1.82	2.93	Woodridge village line	Dairyland Road in Fallsburg	Ulster County line (becomes CR 53A)	

=== Routes 161–168 ===
Like the 150 series, the county routes numbered from 161 to 168 (161–164, 166, 166A, and 168 in actuality) do not form a series. However, in this case, most of them are not related.

Route list

Route	Length (mi)	Length (km)	From	Via	To	Notes
CR 161	4.44	7.15	NY 17 exit 107 / CR 173 in Thompson	Heiden Road	NY 42 in Fallsburg	
CR 162	1.73	2.78	Pine Kill Road	Yankee Lake Road in Mamakating	CR 166	
CR 163	1.57	2.53	0.28 miles (0.45 km) north of David Rhodes Road	Pine Kill and Yankee Lake roads in Mamakating	Orange County line (becomes CR 61)	Discontinuous at US 209
CR 164	6.14	9.88	NY 17B	Beechwood Road in Delaware	NY 52	
CR 166	1.16	1.87	CR 162	Mount Prosper Road in Mamakating	NY 17 exit 112	Part of NY 17 from 1924 to the mid-1930s
CR 166A	0.26	0.42	CR 166 at NY 17 exit 112	Masten Lake Crossover Road in Mamakating	CR 172	
CR 168	0.78	1.26	NY 97	Minisink Battleground Road in Highland	York Lake Road at Minisink Battlefield County Park	

=== Roscoe to Bloomingburg (171–179) ===
Map of Sullivan County and vicinity with CR 171 through CR 179A highlighted in red

The Roscoe to Bloomingburg series is made up of county routes 171 through 176, 178, and 179, plus three spur routes. All eight mainline routes are mostly continuous and collectively extend from the Delaware County line northwest of Roscoe to the Bloomingburg village line just west of the Orange County line. In between, the route serves Liberty, Monticello, and Wurtsboro via locally maintained highways as the county designations end at the village limits. The series parallels the NY 17 expressway for its entire length and also runs along the southern boundary of Catskill Park from Livingston Manor to the Delaware County line.

Most of the eight mainline routes and CR 179A were originally designated as part of NY 17 in 1924. In the vicinity of Wurtsboro, however, NY 17 initially followed modern CR 166. It was realigned between 1935 and 1938 to use what is now CR 172 instead. Construction began in the early 1950s on a new limited-access alignment for NY 17 through Sullivan County. Over the next 10 years, NY 17 was realigned to follow the freeway as new sections of it opened up. By 1962, all of the modern Quickway from Parksville to Bloomingburg was complete and open to traffic. The highway was extended north to Livingston Manor (exit 96) by 1964 and completed through Sullivan County by 1968.

Route list

Route	Length (mi)	Length (km)	From	Via	To	Notes
CR 171	2.71	4.36	Wurtsboro village line	Mamakating Road in Mamakating	Bloomingburg village line	
CR 172	5.27	8.48	NY 17 exit 110 in Thompson	Wurtsboro Mountain Road	Wurtsboro village line in Mamakating	
CR 173	3.43	5.52	Monticello village line	East Broadway and Bridgeville Road in Thompson	NY 17 exit 108	
CR 173A	0.27	0.43	CR 173	Cimarron Road in Thompson	NY 17 exit 106	
CR 174	6.08	9.78	NY 17B at NY 17 exit 104	Old Route 17 in Thompson	CR 175 at Liberty town line	
CR 174A	0.08	0.13	NY 17 exit 104 westbound off-ramp	Ramp connection in Thompson	CR 174	
CR 175	3.14	5.05	CR 174 at Thompson town line	Harris Road in Liberty	Liberty village line	
CR 176	3.26	5.25	Liberty village line	Parksville Road in Liberty	NY 17 exit 98	
CR 178	3.60	5.79	NY 17 exit 97	Old Route 17 in Rockland	CR 179 0.45 miles (0.72 km) south of Covered Bridge Road	
CR 179	5.93	9.54	CR 178 0.45 miles (0.72 km) south of Covered Bridge Road	Old Route 17 in Rockland	CR 91 / CR 179A	Overlaps with NY 206 north of NY 17 exit 94
CR 179A	1.40	2.25	NY 206 / CR 91 / CR 179	Old Route 17 in Rockland	Delaware County line (becomes CR 17)	

=== CR 183 and spurs ===
CR 183 is assigned to Airport Road, which connects NY 17B and NY 55 to Sullivan County International Airport. The route has three spurs, all located in the vicinity of the airport.

Route list

Route	Length (mi)	Length (km)	From	Via	To	Notes
CR 183	2.73	4.39	NY 17B	Airport Road in Bethel	NY 55 / CR 14	
CR 183A	0.20	0.32	CR 183	Airport Access Road in Bethel	Dead end	
CR 183B	0.29	0.47	CR 183	Upper Industrial Park Road in Bethel	Dead end	
CR 183C	0.19	0.31	CR 183	Lower Industrial Park Road in Bethel	Dead end	

== See also ==
- County routes in New York
