= SUNY Sullivan =

Community college in Loch Sheldrake, New York, U.S.

- Former name: Sullivan County Community College
- Type: Public community college
- Established: 1962; 64 years ago
- Parent institution: State University of New York
- President: Dr. David Potash
- Undergraduates: 1,527 (fall 2025)
- Location: Loch Sheldrake, New York, United States; 41.7688°N 74.6675°W
- Campus: Rural 405 acres (1.64 km^{2})
- Colors: Green and Gold
- Nickname: The Generals
- Sporting affiliations: National Junior College Athletic Association, Region XV
- Mascot: General Dunker
- Website: www.sunysullivan.edu

SUNY Sullivan is a public community college in Loch Sheldrake, New York. It was founded in 1962 and is part of the State University of New York (SUNY) system and funded in part by Sullivan County, New York. It is accredited by the Middle States Commission on Higher Education. The campus moved from its original campus at the old South Fallsburgh High School in South Fallsburg in 1973.

The college offers 40 degree and certificate programs in career and transfer program areas.

== Campus ==
SUNY Sullivan is situated on 405 acres (1.64 km^{2}) of land and its campus features nine interconnected buildings plus the Paul Gerry Fieldhouse, the Lazarus I. Levine Residence Hall, and the EcoGreen Townhouses. A geothermal system provides heat and air conditioning for the campus. Sustainability is an important part of SUNY Sullivan's mission, and is reflected across campus via an organic farm in partnership with New Hope Community, a composting program, community gardens, a nine-acre solar field, and an apiary.

== Athletics ==
The college's 12 intercollegiate sports teams compete in Division II (Varsity and JV teams) and Division III in the NJCAA. The school mascot is General Dunker, and its teams are known as The Generals. Sullivan Generals sports teams include: men's and women's basketball (Division II), baseball (Division II), women's volleyball (Division III), men's and women's cross country (Division III), men's and women's track & field (Division III), men's and women's golf (Division III), men's wrestling (Division III), and co-ed cheerleading (Division III). Intramural activities are ongoing throughout the year. The Sullivan Generals men's basketball team won three Division III National Championships in the 1990s, and won the 2007 Division III Championship with a 32–0 record. The college was the home of the NJCAA Division III Men's Basketball National Tournament through 2016.

== Notable alumni ==
- Joey Altman, chef, restaurateur, and TV host on the Food Network, winner of the James Beard Award in 2000, 2001, and 2006.
- Mashama Bailey, chef.
- David Berkowitz, serial killer, also known as the Son of Sam.
- Cleanthony Early, professional basketball player, selected with the 34th overall pick in the 2014 NBA draft by the New York Knicks.
- Eddy Galland and Bobby Shafran, two of the Three Identical Strangers who discovered each other by attending the college, after being adopted separately as infants.
- Assaf Lowengart (born 1998), Israeli baseball player on Team Israel
- Gene Simmons, Israeli-American co-founder, bassist, singer and songwriter of the rock band Kiss.
- Rafael 'Dose' Vargas, rapper in the Dominican Hip hop group 2 In A Room, now known as Fulanito.
