= Stony Clove Notch =

Mountain pass in Greene County, New York

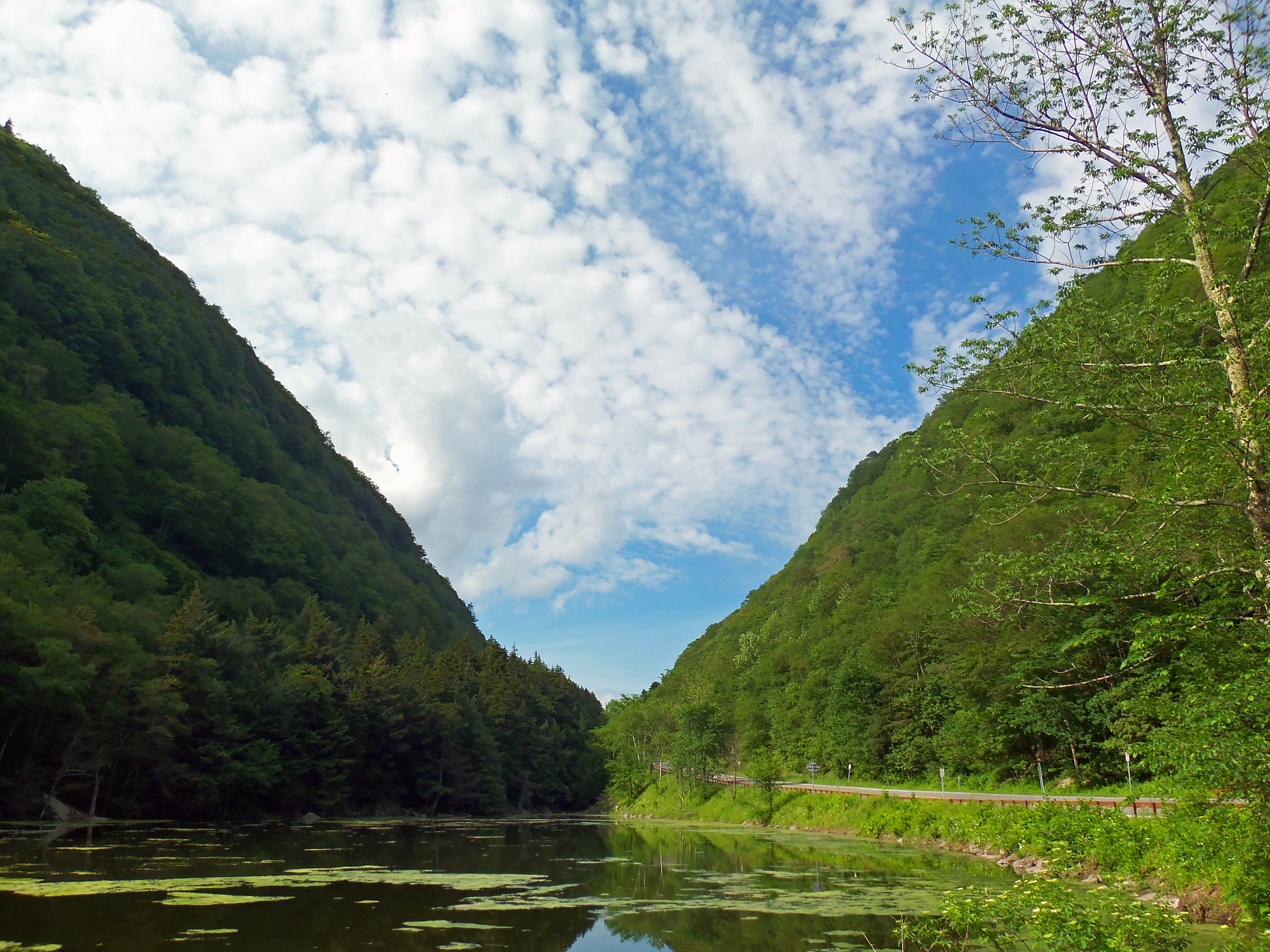
- Stony Clove Notch behind Notch Lake.
- Interactive map of Stony Clove Notch
- Elevation: 2,220 ft (680 m)
- Traversed by: NY 214

Third Approach
- Location: Town of Hunter, Greene County, New York, United States
- Range: Catskills
- Coordinates: 42°09′54″N 74°12′06″W
- Topo map: USGS Hunter

Stony Clove Notch is a narrow pass, roughly 2,220 feet (677 m) in elevation located in the town of Hunter in Greene County, New York, deep in the Catskill Mountains. It is traversed by New York State Route 214, although in the past the Ulster and Delaware Railroad went through it as well.

The notch divides Hunter and Plateau mountains. There is just enough room for the road, and the steep, soaring slopes of both mountains are some of the Catskills' most striking scenery, with landslides and rocky cliffs visible. It sits at one end of the range of mountains known as the Devil's Path, and early visitors found it a terrifying place to visit.

Today it is a popular destination not only for tourists in the region but for outdoor recreationists as well. One of the Catskills' major hiking trails crosses the road near the notch, and ice climbers and snowboarders have lately been attracted to the cliffs and slopes in winter.

== History ==
=== Natural origins ===
Stony Clove Notch was created during the end of the last Ice Age, when meltwater that had accumulated in what is now the Schoharie headlands to the north of the notch gradually began eroding its way through the gap between the mountains, eventually becoming the Stony Clove Creek.

=== Human use ===
When the first Europeans were taken through the notch, it was narrow enough that not only was travel through it possible only on foot, those travelers had to go through in single file. As painter and writer Charles Lanman said in the 1840s:

It is the loneliest and most awful corner of the world that I have ever seen — none other, I fancy, could make a man feel more utterly desolate. It is a type of valley of the shadow of death; in single file did we have to pass through it and in single file must we pass to the grave...

Catskill historian Alf Evers suggests that those interested in getting an idea of what Stony Clove Notch was like before the construction of the roads visit nearby Diamond Notch, where it is still possible to put one foot on Southwest Hunter Mountain and another on West Kill Mountain.

A few years later, at great expense, the route through the notch was widened to allow enough room for a single wagon by Charles Edwards, a local tanner. Later excavations allowed the Stony Clove and Catskill Mountain Railroad to build a narrow gauge rail line through the gap. It was later upgraded to standard gauge and used until 1940, with a flagstop Stony Clove Notch Railroad Station located nearby. The railbed remains visible in the woods to the east almost all the way to the height of land.

The Stoney Clove Turnpike was a private company that incorporated in 1873 to upgrade and improve the existing wagon road. It eventually became today's Route 214.

== Geography ==
The notch divides the Schoharie and Esopus subwatersheds of the Hudson River basin.

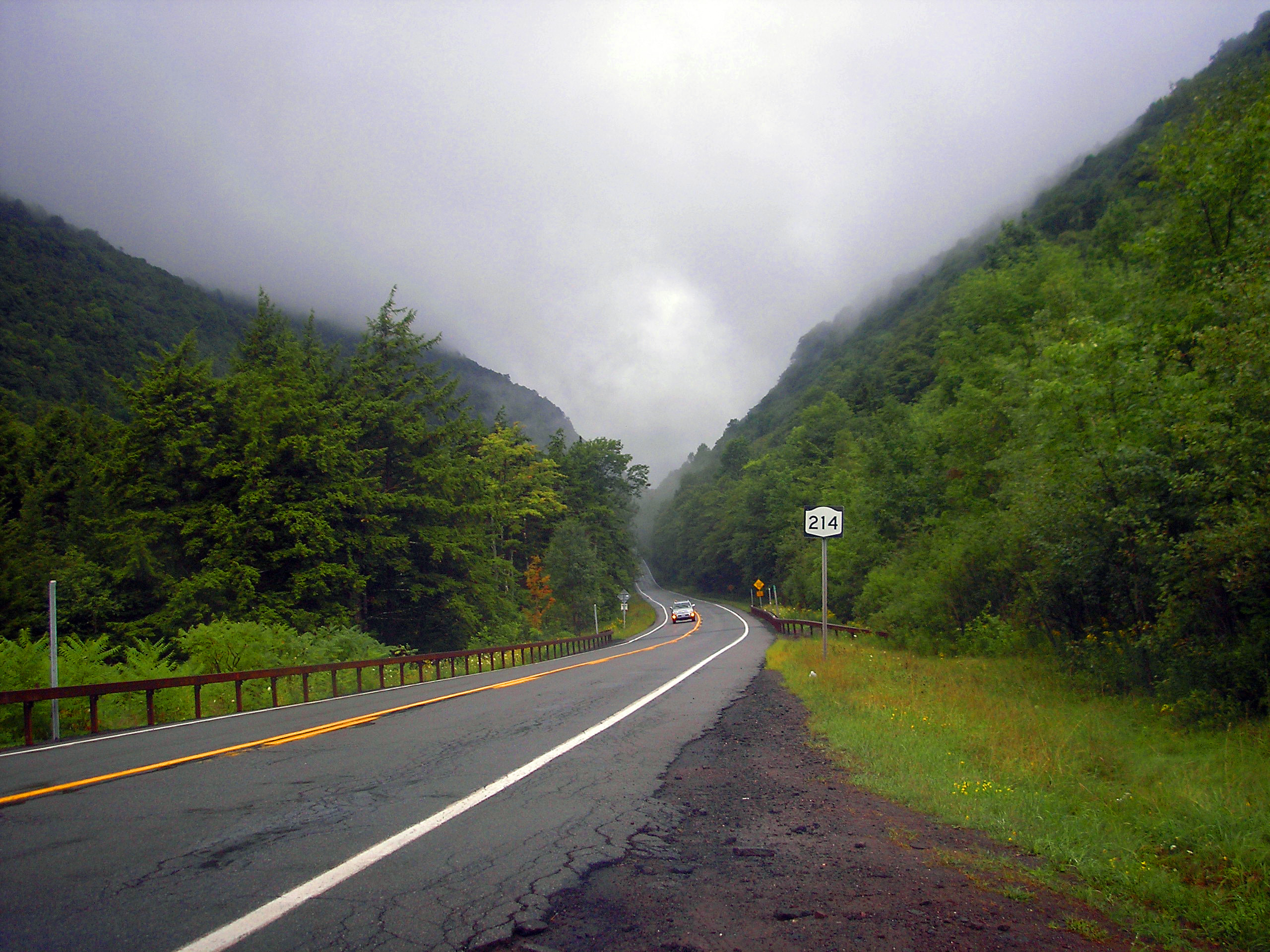
Northern approach to notch in gloomy weather

The approach from the Schoharie to the north, where the two mountains can be seen from 214's junction with Route 23A, is characterized by a steady upward climb after the creek has been crossed, the two mountains seeming more and more immense until they just about swallow the road. Evers recommends coming this way when thunderstorms are brewing to the south if one wishes to understand attitudes such as Lanman's. "Lightning and thunder will be tossed back and forth from one mountain to the other," he writes. "And it will not be hard for a man with a normal amount of imagination to put himself in the place of his ancestors and see the Stony Clove transformed into the very gates of Hell."

From the south, via Phoenicia, the approach up Stony Clove has less drama, since Hunter and Plateau are not visible until the notch is considerably closer. However, it offers much sylvan scenery, winding along Stony Clove Creek as it gradually gets higher and higher. Finally, at the Devil's Tombstone public campground it straightens out and the notch becomes apparent as it sweeps by Notch Pond and up to the height of land.

== Environment ==
The notch is noteworthy as one of the few locations in the Catskills where boreal forest occurs below 3,000 feet (914 m) in elevation. Forest fires in 1893 which destroyed 3,000 acres (12 km^{2}) around the notch, mostly on the Plateau side, and the steep terrain have left depleted, thin soils where balsam fir and red spruce can be seen along the west (Hunter) side of the road from the pond up into the notch. Scrubby paper birch, also common to boreal forests, is the dominant deciduous species on the Plateau side.

Most of the lands around the notch are protected areas of the Catskill Park portion of New York's Forest Preserve. The Plateau lands are the western end of the Indian Head Wilderness Area; Hunter's are currently classified a step lower, as the Hunter Mountain Wild Forest, though a pending update to the Catskill State Land Master Plan would combine it with other properties to classify it, too, as wilderness.

== Recreation ==
A medium-sized parking lot sits next to Notch Pond (known in the early days as Lake Stygian) just below the notch, right where the popular Devil's Path hiking trail crosses the road (the only road crossing in its entire 24.2-mile (39 km) length). Most are bound for one of the three High Peaks in the area: Plateau, Hunter and Southwest Hunter. Potable water is available for hikers and people using the day-use facilities from several pumps next to the parking lot.

After crossing the old railbed, the trail begins a steady ascent of 1,400 vertical feet (427 m) to the Orchard Point lookout, which offers a view across the notch to all the nearby peaks including West Kill Mountain beyond Southwest Hunter. From there it is two miles (3.2 km) across the aptly named Plateau to the mountain's actual summit.

To the west, the ascent is not so severe, although there are some steep sections, most famously near a ledge lower down on the trail called the Devil's Portal. There are no views, although there is a nice level section traversing along the back of Hunter to the Devil's Acre Lean-to, where the Hunter Mountain Trail leads to the top of the Catskills' second-highest peak. The Acre is also the beginning of the sometimes-difficult bushwhack to Southwest Hunter.

Currently, the Long Path long-distance trail joins the Devil's Path here for the trip up Plateau after a two-mile (3 km) roadwalk. Future plans will relocate it into the deep forest, far from the highway.

In winter, ice climbers can also be found here seeking thrills on the cliffs on the Plateau side via a short hike; climbing is not otherwise done much in the Catskills due to the loose sedimentary rock of the region. Snowboarders have also found the slope offers challenging wilderness runs.

Hunters have also come in-season, although the topography can make the area fatally dangerous. In fall 2000 a local high school teacher was found dead after having fallen off one of the cliffs on the Hunter side during a hunt.
