= Stony Clove =

Stony Clove may refer to:

In New York:

- Stony Clove Creek, a tributary of Esopus Creek
- Stony Clove Notch, a narrow pass in the Town of Hunter in Greene County
- Stony Clove Notch Railroad Station, a flag stop on the former Ulster and Delaware Railroad closed in 1932 when that railroad was acquired by New York Central
