= Colonels Chair =

Mountain in New York, United States

- Location within New York Location within the United States

Highest point
- Elevation: 3,199 ft (975 m)
- Coordinates: 42°12′02″N 74°13′51″W

Geography
- Location: SW of Hunter, New York, U.S.
- Topo map: USGS Hunter

Colonels Chair is a subpeak of Hunter Mountain in Greene County, New York, southwest of Hunter. Located south is and to the west is Rusk Mountain. Colonels Chair drains north into Schoharie Creek via Taylor Hollow and Shanty Hollow. The Hunter Mountain Ski Resort is mostly located on Colonels Chair.
