= Southwest Hunter Mountain =

Mountain in United States of America

Southwest Hunter Mountain (Leavitt Peak)
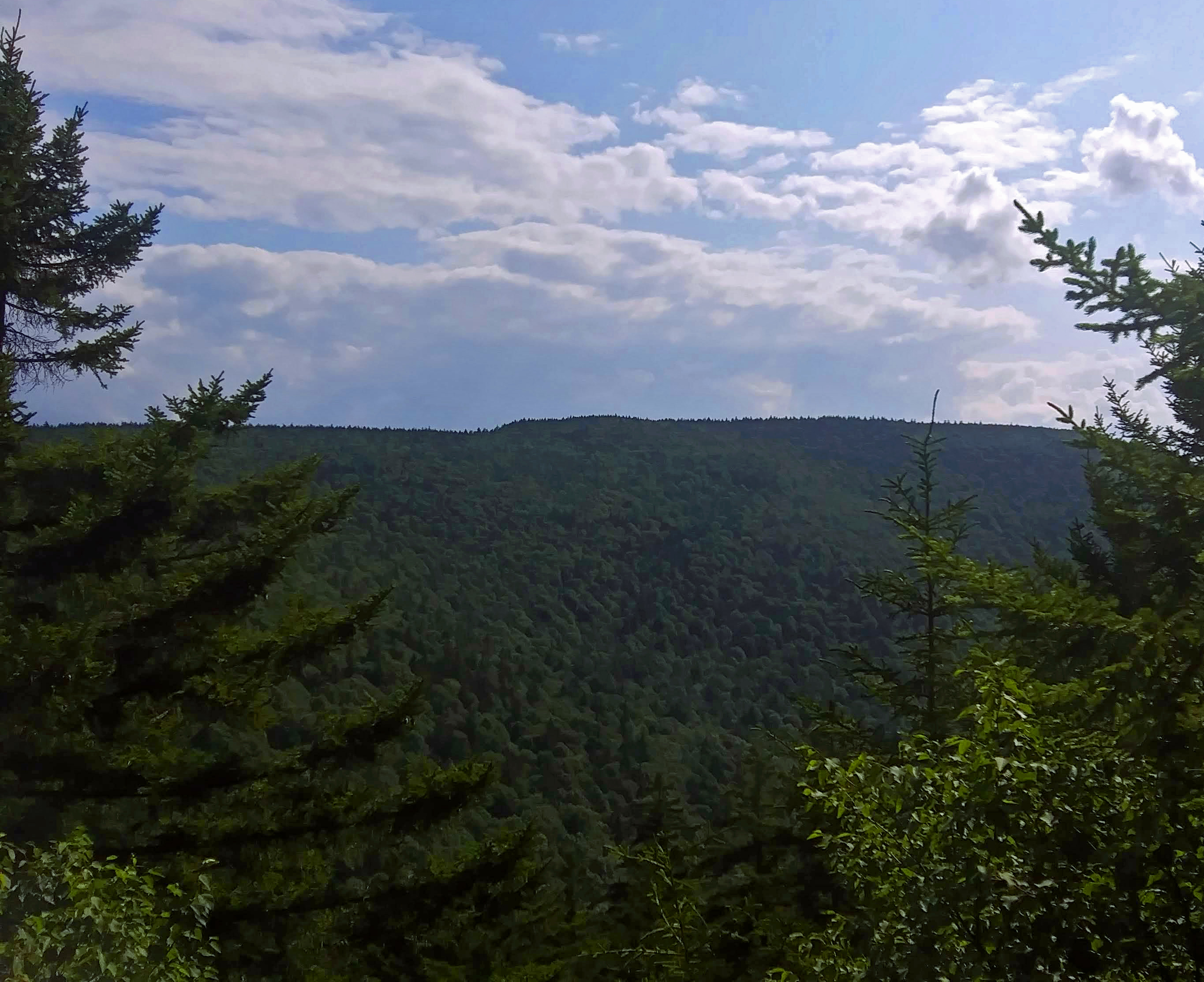
- Southwest Hunter from Geiger Point

Highest point
- Elevation: 3,750 feet (1,140 m)
- Prominence: 200 ft (60 m)
- Listing: Catskill High Peaks 15th
- Coordinates: 42.1625°N 74.2436°W

Geography
- Location within New York Location within the United States
- Location: Hunter, Greene County, New York
- Parent range: Devil's Path
- Topo map: USGS Hunter

Southwest Hunter Mountain (Leavitt Peak) is a subpeak of Hunter Mountain, located in Greene County, New York. It is considered one of the Catskills' High Peaks in its own right, because of its separation from the main summit, and its topographic prominence. Hunter Mountain is named after John Hunter, who also gave his name to the town of Hunter.

Southwest Hunter is part of the Devil's Path range of the Catskill Mountains. SW Hunter is flanked to the northeast by the main summit of Hunter, and to the west faces West Kill Mountain across 800-foot-deep (240 m) Diamond Notch. It is considered a bushwhack, as there are no official trails leading to its summit, in the midst of a dense montane boreal forest of red spruce and balsam fir. Attempts to climb from Diamond Notch, the closest approach of a maintained trail, have led to the creation of a maze of herd paths on the level area west of the mountain's summit, none of which leads to it and many of which dead-end. Hikers have instead been following the bed of a rail line used by a 19th century logging company that begins just off the Devil's Path, 0.1 miles (160 m) west of the Devil's Acre Lean-to, at a small rock cairn. It traverses the ridge at roughly 3,500 ft (1,100 m) for three-quarters of a mile (1.21 km) where another herd path turns uphill to the peak (This upward turn is easy to miss, there are several other junctions prior to it. It is only marked by an arrow scratched onto a nearby rock; it has in the past been marked by another cairn). The summit canister is in a small clearing.

Southwest Hunter stands within the watershed of the Hudson River, which drains into New York Bay. The north side of SW Hunter drains into the headwaters of the West Kill, thence into Schoharie Creek, the Mohawk River, and the Hudson River. The southeast slopes of SW Hunter drain into Myrtle Brook, thence into Stony Clove Creek, Esopus Creek, and the Hudson River. The southwest side of SW Hunter drains into Hollow Brook, thence into Stony Clove Creek.

Southwest Hunter is within the Hunter Mountain Wild Forest of the Catskill Park of New York's Forest Preserve.

Southwest Hunter is unnamed in the GNIS database; there is an effort underway to get the peak named Leavitt Peak in memory of Bill & Elinore Leavitt, two of the founders of the Catskill 3500 club.

== See also ==
- List of mountains in New York
