= New York State Route 214 =

Highway in New York

New York State Route 214
- NY 214 highlighted in red

Route information
- Maintained by NYSDOT
- Length: 12.48 mi (20.08 km)
- Existed: 1930–present
- Tourist routes: Mountain Cloves Scenic Byway

Major junctions
- South end: NY 28 in Shandaken
- North end: NY 23A near Tannersville

Location
- Country: United States
- State: New York
- Counties: Ulster, Greene

Highway system
- New York Highways; Interstate; US; State; Reference; Parkways
← NY 213	→ NY 215

New York State Route 214 (NY 214) is a 12.48-mile (20.08 km) long state highway through the Catskill Park sections of Ulster and Greene counties. The route begins at an intersection with NY 28 in the town of Shandaken, just southwest of the hamlet of Phoenicia. The route runs through the narrow mountain pass called Stony Clove Notch before reaching the town of Hunter, where it ends at NY 23A.

NY 214 was part of a tannery road constructed by Colonel William Edwards of Hunter in the late 1840s, opening by 1849. The road was upgraded in 1873 to the Stoney Clove Turnpike, which serviced hotels and resorts in the Catskills. In 1930, the route was designated as NY 214, but the part in Greene County was not state-maintained, instead by the county. From 1946 to 1956, the residents of the hamlet of Lanesville spent time fighting for NY 214 to be reconstructed due to being an unsafe dirt road for their children to attend school using their bus. After two sections were completed by 1952, the last section in Greene County was a political debate for four years over the New York State Department of Public Works delaying the project for a multitude of reasons. Construction of the final section finally commenced on July 16, 1956.

In 1994, it was proposed that NY 214 become part of a scenic byway and in 2013, the state of New York approved a bill creating the Mountain Cloves Scenic Byway, which is a 41-mile (66 km) byway with multiple branches serving the Catskill Mountains.

== Route description ==
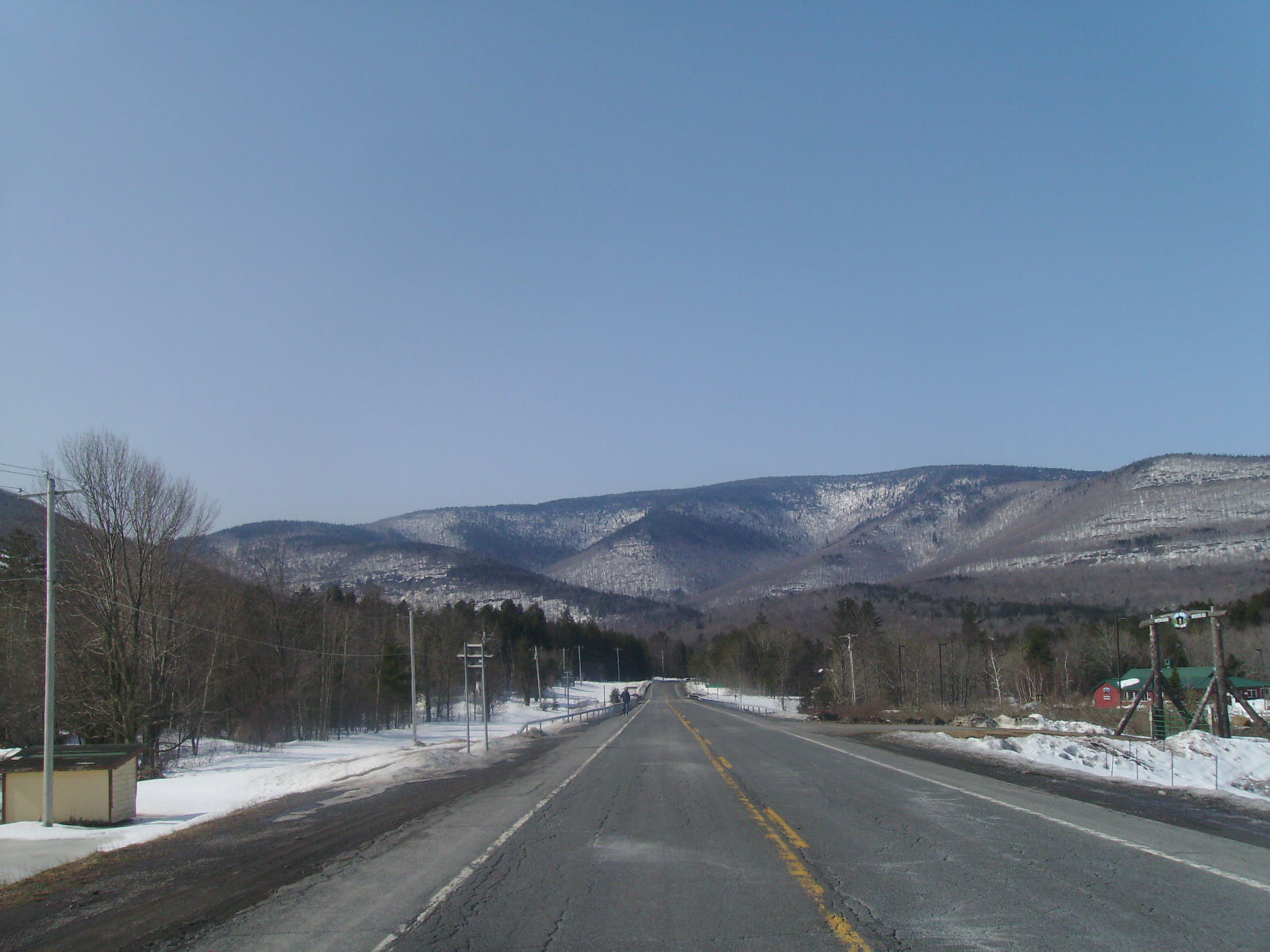
NY 214 heading southbound from NY 23A facing Hunter Mountain

NY 214 begins at an intersection with NY 28 in the town of Shandaken as the latter runs along the Esopus Creek. NY 214 gains the moniker of Main Street, climbing downhill into the hamlet of Phoenicia, crossing a tributary of Esopus Creek, Stony Clove Creek, into the center of the community. A block after the water crossing, NY 214 turns northwest off Main Street, becoming a two-lane commercial street, bypassing the downtown section of Phoenicia, now paralleling the waterway. NY 214 soon leaves Phoenicia, bending northeast along Stony Clove Creek, crossing northeast along the sides of the nearby mountains, reaching the hamlet of Chichester, where it becomes a two-lane residential road in the middle of the notch.

NY 214 continues northeast out of Chichester, crossing through the town of Shandaken, remaining a two-lane roadway. A short distance northeast of Chichester, the route crosses out of Ulster County and into Greene County. NY 214 continues northeast through the town of Hunter. Reaching the hamlet of Lanesville, the route becomes a rural mountainside road through various mountains of the Catskill High Peaks. For a short distance along the route east of Lanesville, the route bends eastward rather than northeast, reaching the hamlet of Edgewood, which consists of a few homes and a junction with Notch Hill Road. At this junction, NY 214 turns northward between Plateau and Hunter mountains, becoming a two-lane woods road.

NY 214 passes a small pond of Stony Clove Notch, continuing north and turning northeast near Higgins Road. After the northeastern turn, the route junctions with the southern terminus of County Route 83 (CR 83 or Ski Bowl Road). The route winds out and becomes a flat area through Hunter, reaching a junction with NY 23A in the hamlet of Hunter, just west of Tannersville.

== History ==
=== Construction and designation ===
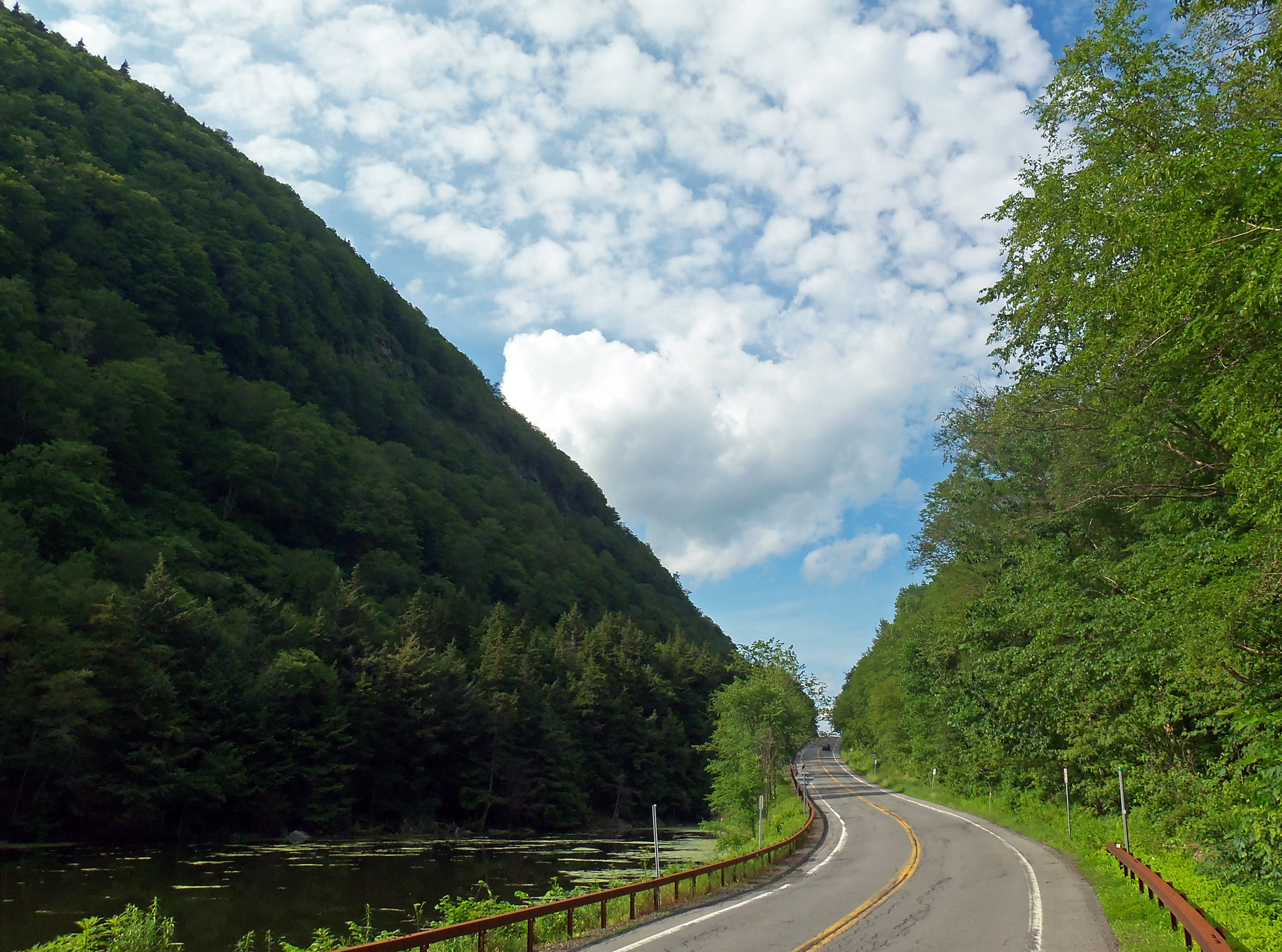
NY 214 looking north into Stony Clove Notch

NY 214 dates back to a road constructed in the late 1840s by Colonel William Edwards, a tanner from Hunter. This road was constructed along the clove that marks eastern flank of Hunter Mountain and western of Plateau Mountain in the Catskills so that Edwards to get hemlock tree bark to the tannery from the mountains. The road constructed by Edwards and first used by Amos Connolly by 1849 for the first wagon use was upgraded in 1873 upon state approval of the Stoney Clove Turnpike, which occurred by the New York State Legislature on April 30. The road's design used has been speculated that there was a significant issue with erosion when it comes to the road through Stony Clove Notch, even into the 1940s. Stacked rock walls were commonly used to create abutments and construct banks from the streams below.

In 1881, construction begun on the Stony Clove and Catskill Mountain Railway, a narrow-gauge railway from Phoenicia and the Ulster and Delaware Railroad to the village of Hunter. This new railroad was constructed to serve the Hotel Kaaterskill through the notch. The railroad was completed in 1883 and converted to standard gauge in 1899. An inn was constructed at the station in Edgewood, helping tourists and recreation through the Catskills. The railroad was shut down in April 1936 and in 1940, the tracks were torn up, though the right-of-way remains.

The Notch Road was not originally included in the New York State highway map in 1912. By 1921, it had not been added. However, in 1925, with pressure from New York State Senator Arthur F. Bouton, Notch Road was added to the state highway map in 1925. The dirt road was taken over by the state of New York in the late 1920s and designated as NY 214 as part of the 1930 renumbering of state highways in New York.

=== Reconstruction debacles ===
==== 1946–1951 ====
NY 214 became the subject of controversy for the conditions of the road through Lanesville and Greene County. The members of a committee of parents in Lanesville noted on December 2, 1946 that they would hold their students from going to school starting on January 6, 1947 if the state did not start work on repairing the road for safety. The committee noted that the conditions of NY 214 were dangerous, with the road's pavement not being maintained for use of the school bus and guard rails were not installed to keep cars from going into waterways. The parents remained committed and held about 55 students out of school starting January 2, stating that nothing still had been done to maintain NY 214. Burton Belknap, part of the State Education Department, stated that they intended to make sure they would work with the local parents in order to get the students back in school. The student strike was lifted on January 13 on conditions that the town of Hunter made for repairing the road.

Parents noted that they demanded safer guard rails because the ones that stood were dangerous to poor construction. They also noted several sections with 15–20-foot (4.6–6.1 m) drops that had none whatsoever. Petitioners had sent 700 signatures to the state stating that the road had been neglected for the previous 20 years. However, by May 22, nothing still had been done despite talks, but the state claimed they needed time to get this work done. The parents pointed out a case where a driver ended up in Stony Clove Creek due to lack of guard rails. The state stated that bids on upgrading NY 214 would not go out until July and that the repairs to pavement would be within two weeks. Bids on NY 214 for the regular repairs were accepted in mid-September, with an announcement on September 17 that a bid of $281,418.74 (1947 USD) was provided by Triple Cities Construction of Binghamton to reconstruct a 2.98-mile (4.80 km) long section of NY 214 from Edgewood to a point north of Stony Clove.

In November 1948 Greene County's Board of Supervisors voted unanimously to support getting funds for the continuation of reconstruction of NY 214. Funding for this project would come from the Federal Aid Secondary Highway Program. The Board had received letters noting that getting the road a contract should be urgent once money is located. On February 22, 1949, the county announced that the amount of $155,000 (1949 USD) was allotted for the construction on NY 214 as a continuation of funds already allotted since 1946. This would cover the rest of the road through the town of Hunter. However, the chairman of the Board, Claude Tompkins and the supervisor for Hunter, G. Richard Ham, both requested an investigation into whether or not this would be enough money to pay for the project. That August, the Lanesville Parents Committee joined other groups in forming the Greene County chapter of the New York Good Roads Association. John Papp, the chairman of the Parents Committee noted that they were focused with the chapter on urging reconstruction of NY 214 By February 1950, Papp had been elected temporary president of the new Greene County chapter.

In February 1950, New York State Senator Arthur H. Wicks announced that the funds for construction of NY 214 would be put into a contract by May 1. The plans were completed and bridge designs were being finished. On May 16, the state announced that the bid would be let on the second section of NY 214. By September, things had gone backwards after an automobile with four children fell off the side of NY 214 due to the roadway caving in. This caused yet another parent strike, refusing to let their kids ride the bus on September 27. Senator Wicks called the capital in Albany to find out what the delay was in construction. The state noted that because NY 214 was not maintained by the state, but by Greene County, that it would require approval by the Federal Bureau of Roads in Washington D.C. The state noted that they cannot do any construction until once approval on the plans was obtained. In response, Wicks arranged to get the contract let advertised on October 12 and that a bid would be accepted by November 15. Residents were continuing to hold students from taking the bus to school and that the road was falling apart in numerous areas and that people would have to drive on the shoulder regularly. However, there were no bidders on the contract, and the New York State Department of Public Works opened more bids on December 13 for the 1.63-mile (2.62 km) long section of NY 214 at the cost of $214,000.

This second bidding process was met with success, as the John Arborio, Inc. company of Poughkeepsie for a total of $203,242.80 (1951 USD) won the bid in January 1951. The contract would include the construction of the two bridges and reconstruction of NY 214. The new roadway would be 20 feet (6.1 m) wide and paved with gravel and asphalt, replacing the dirt road that went through the notch. This contract would also eliminate curves and grades along NY 214 from Stony Clove Notch to Kaaterskill Junction and be completed by December 1, 1951.

==== 1952–1956 ====
After construction began on the section of NY 214 at its northern end, the issue came up with Greene County and its southern section of road. The state had put the project on its construction program for 1952, however, it required federal approval. The explanation was due to a request for action created by Wicks to the state superintendent of Public Works, B. D. Tallamy. Henry TenHagen, the deputy chief engineer at the state noted that the project was given to the Federal Bureau of Public Roads, who did not approve it due to restrictions on materials required for construction. The Board of Supervisors for Greene County and the town board for Hunter voted for construction the next year. The demand was raised not only due to the incident in 1950 of the car tumbling off the cliffside, but that a 100-foot (30 m) section of road had been washed out in a recent storm.

On June 9, the federal government approved that the last section of NY 214 was eligible for federal aid, at the cost of $700,000 (1952 USD), which would be subsidized by half by the government. However, due to the approval being announced late in the fiscal year, there was no ability on part of the state to let a bid contract until the next, as all state money for the year had dried up. The $700,000 project would go to four miles of grading, drainage structures, three bridges and paving of two lanes through Greene County. The federal government announced they would approve construction bidding once the state sent documents noting they acquired rights-of-way for the project. However, by July 30, no progress was made by the state on construction despite federal approval according to J. Ernest Wharton, a United States Congressman from Richmondville.

The debacle over the final section of NY 214 dragged into 1953 and soon 1954, when the residents of Lanesville pressed New York State Governor Thomas E. Dewey to take action on the stalled project. The federal appropriation of aid would expire on June 30, 1955 and the committee noted that the state had been making empty promises since February 1952. They pressured Dewey to take steps to expedite the project, as the Public Works department had been making excuses from federal aid, to engineer shortages, to lack of money, approval by Greene County and that the state must match the amount of the federal government provided. By May, the committee turned their requests to United States President Dwight D. Eisenhower for his support on the highway. Eisenhower referred the letter to the Bureau of Public Roads who noted that while the money was still there, it hinged on documents that were never sent regarding the right-of-way in 1952.

On August 24, the Department of Public Works noted a letter to the parents committee noting that NY 214 had been placed on the 1955 program for construction, like it had three years prior. The state also noted that they would do survey and design during the winter of 1954–1955 and then move the project to the contract stage in 1955. By late December 1954, the district engineer for the state noted that the work would be able to be contracted by April 1. However, plans were not sent to the state until late July 1955 to the main office in Albany. To make things worse, the defeat of a $750 million road bond amendment in November 1955 would potentially delay the work on NY 214 even further. Stating more run-around by the state, John Papp, the chair of the parents committee noted that the letting proposal for a contract was to start December 1, 1955, but defeating the amendment changed plans, even though part of the road was severely damaged in a storm on October 16.

By December 1955, however, the committee was fed up once again with the state and their treatment of the NY 214 reconstruction. They threatened yet another school strike after disappointed results from new Governor Averell Harriman, stating it was their only weapon left in the situation. Papp noted that a letter sent by Bellamy noted that the money was not contingent on the failed amendment. Soon after, the state canceled bids on the project, angering Wicks and New York State Assemblyman William E. Brady from Coxsackie. Angered by the decision, the parents went through with their threat to pull their children once again for a week in January 1956 until Wicks and Brady agreed to talk to the state. However, the state accused Papp in late January of confusing the issues over money for funding of the NY 214 project. The new Superintendent for the Public Works Department, John W. Johnson noted that the defeat of the amendment was the reason for canceling the bids of December 1.

On April 19, a letting for the section of NY 214 was finally held, but no bids were received on the project, requiring a second set to begin on June 7. However, Governor Harriman noted that the cost of the project had gone up to $815,000 instead of the original $700,000 estimated in 1952. The bid was won by Rock Construction Company of Sunset Park on June 25 at the cost of $757,886.60, who noted that official construction began on July 16. By August, trees had been removed and the flooded out would be moved away from the creek to avoid future issues. By early September, the company noted that they were about to pour concrete for one of the new bridges and that construction was progressing at a steady rate.

=== Scenic byway ===
In March 1994, the town of Hunter, the Catskill Center for Conservation and Development and the Greene County Planning Department nominated NY 214 along with the Kaaterskill Clove portion of NYS 23A and the clove portion of Platte Clove Road to the New York State Scenic Roads Program. In 2011, it was proposed that the Mountain Cloves Scenic Byway would serve a section of NY 214 from State Route 23A to the Greene County line. Eventually, this would connect the Catskill Mountains Scenic Byway with the Mountain Cloves Scenic Byway, with the designation of the former in 2015. On June 20, 2013, a bill passed the New York State Assembly to designate the Mountain Cloves Scenic Byway and sent to Governor Andrew Cuomo to be signed. On July 12, the Governor signed the Mountain Cloves Scenic Byway into law. The southern section of Route 214 was designated part of the Catskill Mountains Scenic Byway in November 2015.

== Major intersections ==
County	Location	mi	km	Destinations	Notes
Ulster	Shandaken	0.00	0.00	NY 28 – Kingston, Pine Hill, Belleayre Ski Center	Southern terminus; hamlet of Phoenicia
Greene	Town of Hunter	12.48	20.08	NY 23A (Main Street) – Hunter, Tannersville	Northern terminus
1.000 mi = 1.609 km; 1.000 km = 0.621 mi
