= Chichester, New York =

Chichester, NY
- hamlet
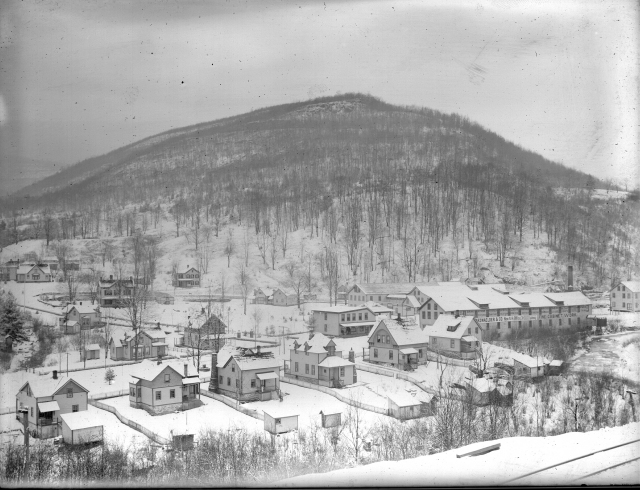
- Etymology: from founder's name
- Interactive map of Chichester, NY
- Coordinates: 42°06′06″N 74°18′34″W
- Country: United States
- State: New York
- Region: Catskills
- County: Ulster
- Founder: Frank and Lemuel Chichester
- ZIP code: 12416
- Area code: 845

The hamlet of Chichester, New York, formerly referred to as Chichesterville, is one of the northernmost communities in the town of Shandaken, being adjacent to the borderline between Ulster and Greene counties.

The hamlet of Chichester, New York, is not to be confused with the city in West Sussex, England. One difference is that, unlike the city of Chichester, England, the "i" in Chichester, New York, is pronounced like "eye" instead of a vowel sound such as in the word "chip".

== History ==
The hamlet was founded in 1863, by brothers Frank and Lemuel Chichester, whom the town is named after. The Chichester brothers were the sons of Samuel Chichester, the contractor who built the Catskill Mountain House. They were looking for a good location to construct a furniture factory. When they found the right place, the workers at the factory began moving in the area surrounding the factory, therefore founding the company-owned hamlet of Chichester. The narrow gauge Stony Clove and Catskill Mountain Railroad (which would later become a branch of the Ulster and Delaware Railroad) was built through the town in 1881.

As was customary in that time, workers were often paid with company scrip which could be redeemed in the factory-owned general store.

The factory was later purchased by William O. Schwartzwaelder, who was of German ancestry, and renamed the factory after him. The rest of the hamlet was starting to expand, all of the houses and buildings being built by the factory, as were the other buildings. There was one general store in the town, and sold such merchandise as saddles, animal feed, and hardware. There was also a post office and a schoolhouse in the town, the schoolhouse being a house at present.

The furniture factory went out of business decades later in 1939, a few years after the great depression, which devastated the business. The village, at the time comprising 44 houses and buildings, was put up for auction on October 28, 1939. Joseph Day was the auctioneer. The houses and building of hamlet were purchased at the auction, and it has been in the hands of private owners ever since the auction.

== Geography ==
Chichester is within the Catskill Park, and is situated in a mountainous valley. The northern portion of the hamlet borders Greene County, directly south of the hamlet of Lanesville.

There are two major creeks that run through the hamlet. These are the Stony Clove Creek, which starts at Notch Lake in Edgewood, and Warner's Creek, which also starts in Edgewood. The two creeks there, however, are called by the locals Stony Clove and Ox Clove.

== See also ==
- Chichester Railroad Station
- New York State Route 214
- Shandaken, New York
- Stony Clove Creek
- Ulster and Delaware Railroad
