= Ulster and Delaware Railroad =

Railroad in New York State Catskill region

- U&D system map

Overview
- Headquarters: Kingston, New York
- Reporting mark: UD
- Locale: Catskill Mountains, New York
- Dates of operation: 1875–1932
- Successor: New York Central Railroad

Technical
- Track gauge: 4 ft 8 1/2 in (1,435 mm) standard gauge
- Length: 129 miles (208 kilometers)

The Ulster and Delaware Railroad (U&D) was a railroad located in the state of New York. It was often advertised as "The Only All-Rail Route to the Catskill Mountains." At its greatest extent, the U&D extended 107 miles (172 km) from Kingston Point on the Hudson River through the Catskill Mountains to its western terminus at Oneonta, passing through the counties of Ulster, Delaware, Schoharie and Otsego.

== History ==
=== Rondout and Oswego Railroad ===
During the early 19th century, waterways formed the principal transportation network in New York. An important point on this network was Rondout. Located at the confluence of Rondout Creek and the Hudson River, in 1828 it became the eastern terminus of the Delaware and Hudson Canal. Here, cargo and passengers were transferred from canal boats to the larger vessels navigating the Hudson.

By the end of the Civil War, railroads were pre-empting waterways as the preferred method of transportation. Thomas Cornell, founder of the Cornell Steamboat Company and a resident of Rondout, was among those who noticed. Although Cornell made plenty of money from shipping, he planned a railroad that would bring supplies from towns in central or western New York to his port in Rondout. So Cornell chartered the Rondout and Oswego on April 3, 1866, with himself as the first president.

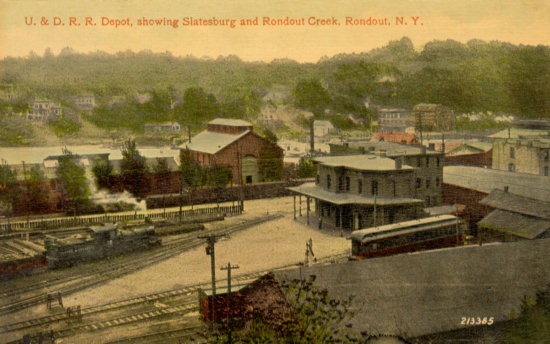
The railroad yard at Rondout

With the work of surveying and acquiring rights of way completed, construction started in 1868. Cornell decided to construct this new railroad of 62- and 70-pound rail. It would go from Rondout to the busy city of Oneonta on the upper Susquehanna River, and then to Oswego on the shore of Lake Ontario. The R&O at 12 miles (19 km) long reached the summer vacation resort of Olive Branch, near the town of Shokan, on September 30, 1869. By the next year, the first train was run and the railroad was finally operational.

In 1870 the railroad was extended to Phoenicia, where the railroad built a stucco station across Esopus Creek from the village. The same year, ownership of the railroad was transferred to John C. Brodhead and the line reached the small town of Big Indian. By 1871 construction reached Dean's Corners (now Arkville) (where it would eventually join the Delaware and Northern). However, the R&O folded upon completing construction to Roxbury, and the task of constructing the remainder of the route was left to its newly organized successor, the New York, Kingston & Syracuse (NYK&S).

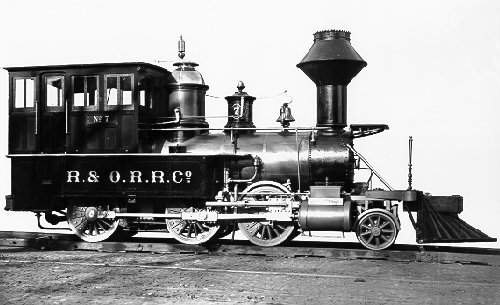
Rondout and Oswego #7

It was a successful railroad, with plenty of passengers coming from surrounding towns and larger cities. Steamboat passengers could dock at Rondout and transfer to the railroad. Later, passengers could also transfer at Kingston, first via the Wallkill Valley Railroad (1872), then via the West Shore Railroad (1883) and much later via the New York, Ontario and Western Railway (1902). From the boats, it was a short walk to the R&O station to transfer to the train. Freight was also very well-handled. Much of the freight income was made from coal shipped along the D&H Canal from the Moosic Mountains near Carbondale, Pennsylvania, to the port at Rondout. There were also vegetables, fruit and milk from the farms in the Catskills.

While steadily grading to Moresville (present-day Grand Gorge), the great number of curves and grades created a problem, as more digging, ties and rails meant greater costs to complete the remainder of the railroad. The railroad could not make enough money to pay the debt and continue building the railroad, so in 1872 Cornell appointed John A. Greene to be president pro tempore for a period of 10 years. Greene was expected to have the railroad finished to the town of Oneonta by 1874, pay all of the debts, and withstand future debts of as much as $700,000. However, the railroad was slowly losing money and eventually had to reduce service before going bankrupt in 1872. Later that year, it was re-organized as the New York, Kingston and Syracuse Railroad to continue with the project.

=== New York, Kingston and Syracuse Railroad ===
After the Rondout and Oswego railroad became bankrupt in 1872, it was quickly re-organized as the New York, Kingston and Syracuse Railroad (NYK&S), directed by George Sharpe. The plan of extending to Oswego was now omitted, and the new plan was to extend to Oneonta and make a sharp turn north to Earlville, where the line would make a connection with the recently constructed Syracuse and Chenango Valley Railroad. Construction of the railroad had begun immediately, and the railroad was extending very quickly. As of 1872, it had already reached the towns of Roxbury and Stamford, with the first train arriving in the village of Stamford late that year. Reaching Oneonta would have to wait another 28 years, to 1900.

This increased service provided the first real rail route into the Catskill Mountains, benefiting both passenger and freight customers. The railroad was further benefited by the many connections to other railroads, enabling passengers from as far away as New York City to visit the Catskills (via the newly constructed Wallkill Valley Railroad and its connection to the Erie Railroad). Another boon to business was a ferry that ran across the Hudson to Rondout from Rhinecliff, with a Rhinebeck and Connecticut Railroad and New York Central and Hudson River Railroad station (the current Amtrak station), connecting the cities of Hartford, Connecticut, Providence, Rhode Island and Boston, Massachusetts to the region.

The town (and later city) of Kingston, New York (centrally located on the Hudson River) was profitable to the railroad, due to the large number of industries of the area, including cement, concrete, bricks and bluestone. Kingston was also a popular passenger stop, as people would rely on the railroad to take them around the Catskills to jobs at mills and small factories.

Although this prosperity seemed good, there was bad news as well. The NYK&S was still not profitable enough to avoid bankruptcy. So in 1873, the NYK&S designated the Farmers Loan and Trust Company as trustee for the first-mortgage bondholders of the railroad. While this helped for a brief time, it was only another two years until even the trustee could not manage the railroad's problems. The railroad became bankrupt in 1875 and was sold by foreclosure to the bank. It was re-organized as the Ulster and Delaware Railroad later that year.

=== Ulster and Delaware Railroad ===
==== Stony Clove and Catskill Mountain Railroad ====
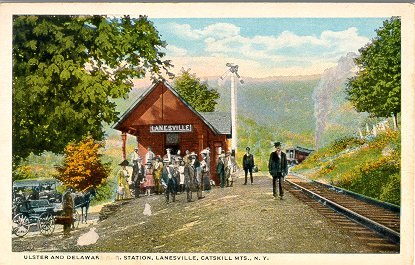
The railroad station at Lanesville, New York

Cornell got the idea for another railroad that would start at the U&D junction in Phoenicia and go up along the Stony Clove Valley to the bustling village of Hunter. He decided to name it the Stony Clove and Catskill Mountain Railroad. Unlike the U & D, it would utilize a 3 ft (914 mm) narrow gauge which theoretically would be cheaper to build and operate. Construction started on the railroad during 1881, with Cornell's son-in-law, Samuel Decker Coykendall, supervising construction. Originally planned as a summer-only operation serving the Ulster County communities of Phoenicia and Chichester, and the Greene County villages of Lanesville, Edgewood, and Hunter, the service was expanded to year-round operation. In addition to the major stations, there was a flagstop at Stony Clove Notch and a station between the Notch and Hunter called Kaaterskill Junction Station (originally Tannersville Junction Station), at the junction of the Kaaterskill Railway.

The difference in gauge between the U&D and SC&CM caused difficulties in transferring rolling stock from the mainline. So, in 1882, the two companies installed a Ramsey car-transfer apparatus in the yard at Phoenicia. This device allowed the standard-gauge equipment to be run on the narrow-gauge line. With the apparatus, the transfer only required about eight minutes, saving the railroads much time and money.

Industries on this line included the William O. Schwartzwalder Furniture Factory, in the company-owned hamlet of Chichester. Other large companies included the Fenwick Lumber Company in Edgewood and the Horatio Lockwood & Company Furniture Factory in Hunter. The railroad was acquired by the U&D in 1892, and these industries now had a new railroad to transport their products.

Today, the restored second Haines Falls station of the U&D railroad can be viewed at Mountain Top Historical Society in Haines Falls.

==== Final years of U&D service ====
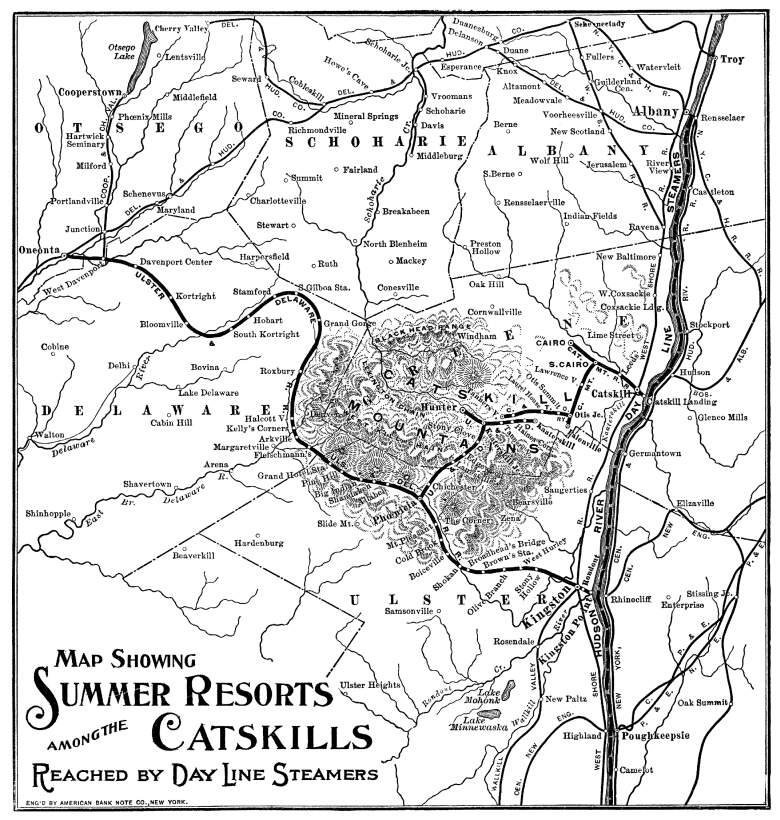
Map showing the U&D and the Catskill Mountain Railway

The U&D's peak year came in 1913, with 676,000 passengers carried up into the Catskills plus substantial amounts of freight. By the time of the Great Depression of 1929 and thereafter, most of the passenger traffic had been lost to private cars on improved highways, buses and shared limousines (called "hacks"); trucks had taken most of the non-commodity freight business; and the railroad was in serious financial trouble and a shadow of its former self. The New York Central acquired the failing U&D on February 1, 1932, under pressure from the Interstate Commerce Commission (see "Ulster and Delaware: Railroad Through The Catskills", by Gerald M. Best). In its latter years (the early 1950s) one morning train a day (except Sundays) ran on the route from Kingston to Phoenicia and Oneonta and one afternoon train in the east-bound direction ran from Oneonta back to Kingston. Passenger service on the route ended on March 31, 1954.

== Narrow gauge rolling stock ==
=== SC&CM locomotives ===
| SC&CM number | Name | Builder | Type | Date | Works number | Remarks |
|---|---|---|---|---|---|---|
| 1st #1 (1882–1886) 2nd #2 (1886–1894) | Stony Clove | Dickson Manufacturing Co. | 2-6-0 | July 1882 | 358 | Purchased new. Redesignated U.&D. R.R. #2 in 1894. Sold to the Chateaugay Railroad in August 1899 (Chateaugay RR 2nd #8). Scrapped in December 1903. |
| 2nd #1 | Hunter | Dickson Manufacturing Co. | 2-6-0 | May 1886 | 530 | Purchased new. Redesignated U&D #4 in 1894. Sold to the Chateaugay Railroad in August 1899 (Chateaugay RR 2nd #2). Scrapped in December 1903. |
| 1st #2 | Gretchen | Dickson Manufacturing Co. | 2-6-0 | Dec. 1878 | 226 | Ex-Plattsburgh & Dannemora #2, Louis D. Pilsbury (1878–1879). Ex-Chateaugay Railroad 1st #2, Louis D. Pilsbury (1879–1881). Purchased in April 1881. Sold in November 1885 to Dexter Hunter Sr., who was president of the Western Ry. of Florida. Leased to the Western Ry. from 1885 to 1892 (#2, Dexter Hunter Jr.). Western Railway went bankrupt and was reorganized as the South-Western Railroad in 1892. Loco leased to S-W. R.R. from 1892 to 1894. |

=== Kaaterskill Railroad locomotives ===
| KRR number | Name | Builder | Type | Date | Works number | Remarks |
|---|---|---|---|---|---|---|
| #1 | Rip Van Winkle | Dickson Manufacturing Co. | 2-6-0 | May 1883 | 423 | Purchased new. Redesignated U&D #1 in 1894. Sold to Empire Steel & Iron Co. in August 1899. Resold to Birmingham Rail & Locomotive Co. in April 1905. Resold to Crystal River Lumber Co., Florida in May 1905. |
| #2 | Derrick Van Brummel | Brooks Locomotive Works | 2-6-0 | June 1883 | 936 | Purchased new. Redesignated U&D #5 in 1894. Sold to F. M. Hicks & Co. between August 1899 & June 1900. |
| #3 | Thomas Cornell | Dickson Manufacturing Co. | 2-6-0 | February 1883 | 411 | Originally Chateaugay Ore & Iron Co. #8 (Dannemora). Purchased by the Kaaterskill R.R. from New York Equipment Co. in July 1893. Redesignated U&D # 3 in 1894. Sold to F. M. Hicks & Co. in August 1899. Resold later in August 1899 to the Otis Engineering & Construction Co. for use on the Catskill & Tannersville Ry. (1st #2). C.&T. Ry. 1st #2 became stationary boiler at Otis Summit, New York between July 1, 1901, and June 30, 1902. |

=== Narrow gauge coaches ===
The coaches that ran on the Narrow Gauge Division had been built by Jackson & Sharp Co. in 1881 and 1883. Between August 1899 and June 1900, they were sold to F. M. Hicks & Co. of Chicago, Illinois. In May 1901, Hicks resold four of the coaches to the White Pass and Yukon Route (WP&YR ##218, 220, 222, and 224). Under White Pass ownership, these cars have been rebuilt several times. They remain in operation. After all of the rebuildings under White Pass ownership, about all that remains of the original cars are the architecture and the superstructure frames.

== Gallery ==
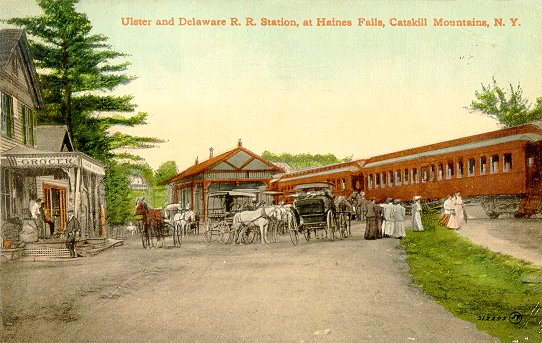
Haines Corners station

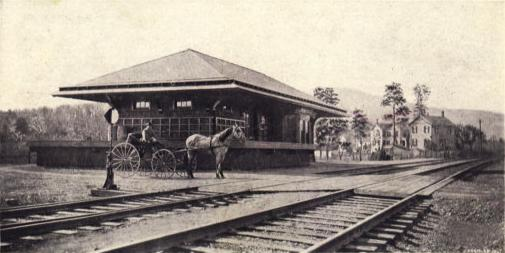
Brown's Station, one of six demolished for the Ashokan Reservoir

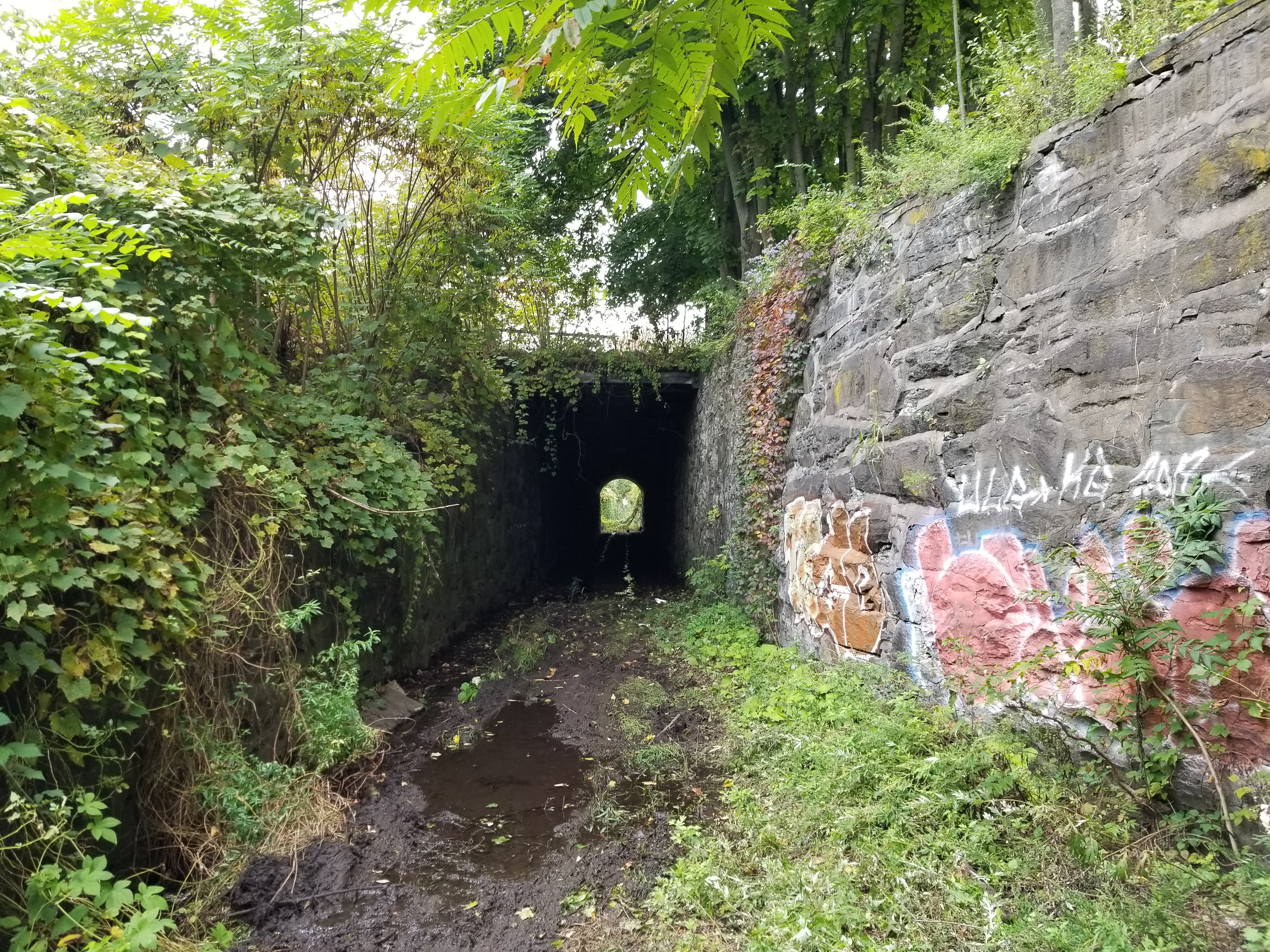
Delaware Avenue Tunnel in Kingston as it appeared in October, 2018

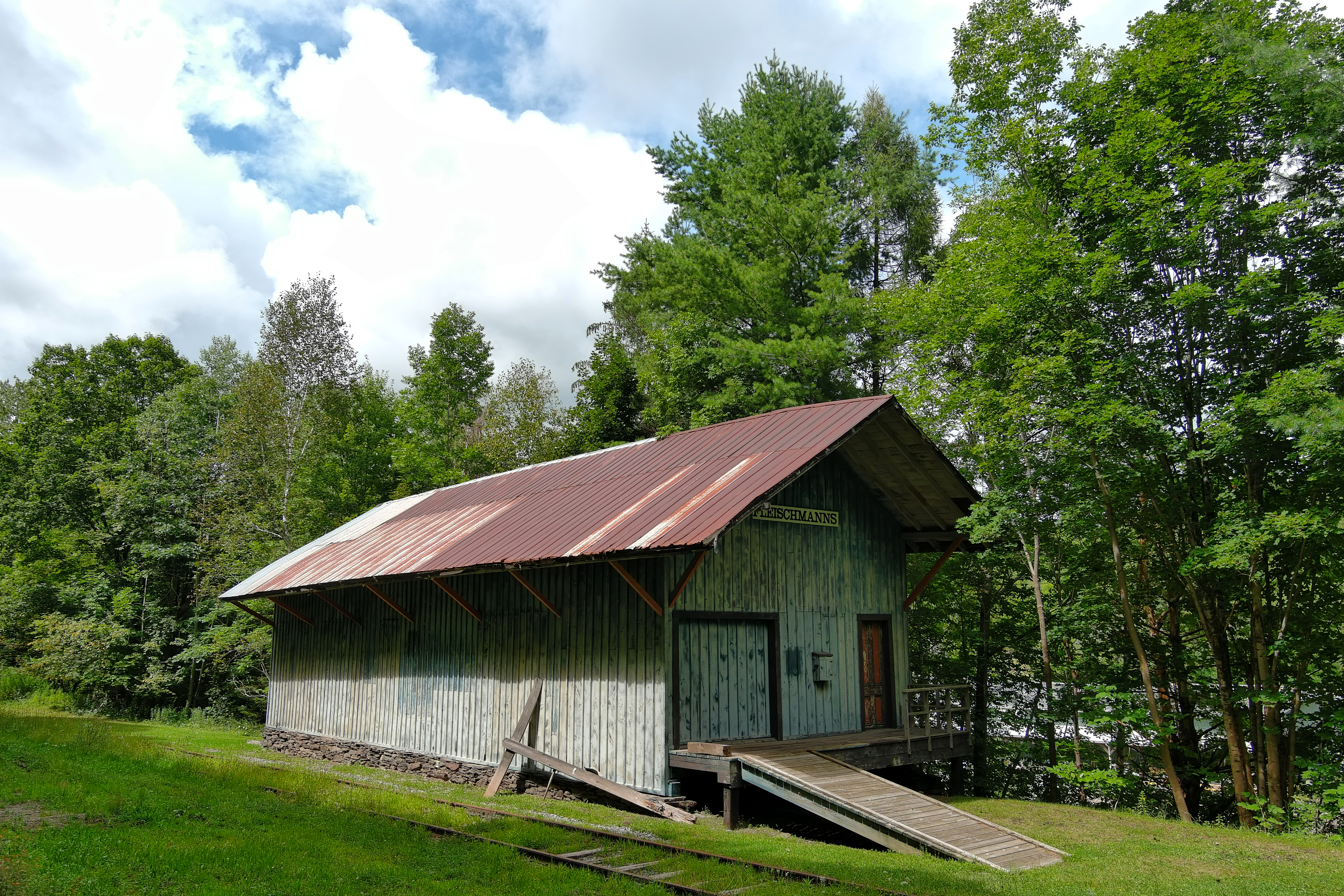
Ulster and Delaware Railroad Freight House in Fleischmanns, New York, photographed on August 19, 2021.

== See also ==
- Ashokan Rail Trail, built on U&D tracks north of Ashokan Reservoir
- List of defunct New York railroads
- List of Ulster and Delaware Railroad stations
- List of New York Central Railroad precursors

== Bibliography ==
- Best, Gerald M. (1972). The Ulster And Delaware: Railroad Through The Catskills. San Marino, CA: Golden West Books. ISBN 978-0-87095-041-4.
