= Freehiking =

Freehiking can refer to

- Naked hiking
- Off-trail hiking
