= Hunter Mountain (New York) =

Highest mountain in Greene County, New York, and second highest in the Catskills

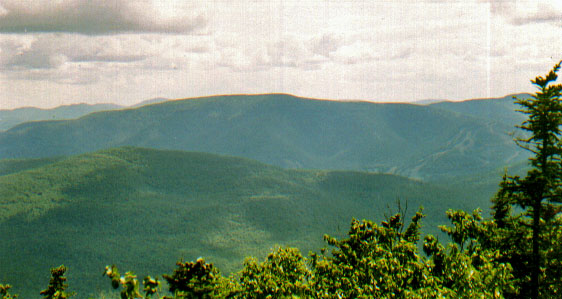
- Hunter Mountain from Black Dome to the north. Ski trails visible at right.

Highest point
- Elevation: 4,040 feet (1,231 m)+
- Prominence: 2,160 ft (660 m)
- Listing: Catskill High Peaks 2nd; Northeast 111; New York County High Points 4th
- Coordinates: 42°10′40″N 74°13′50″W

Geography
- Location within New York Location within the United States
- Location: New York, US
- Parent range: Catskills
- Topo map: USGS Hunter

Climbing
- First ascent: unknown
- Easiest route: old road

Hunter Mountain is in the towns of Hunter and Lexington, just south of the village of Hunter, in Greene County, New York, United States. At approximately 4,040 feet (1,231 m) in elevation, it is the highest peak in the county and the second-highest peak in the Catskill Mountains.

While the mountain is closely associated with the eponymous ski area built around the Colonel's Chair ridge at the mountain's northwest corner, that takes up only a small portion of the mountain. The actual summit, some distance from the ski area, is graced with a fire lookout tower, the highest in the state and second-highest in the Northeast. The former road to it is open to hikers, horses (and possibly mountain bikers in the future). It is the most popular route to the mountain's summit.

== Geography ==
Hunter takes the shape of a medium-length ridge, rising steeply from Stony Clove Notch in the east, then gently to the summit in the center, and gently back down to the west where the land makes a much less steep drop into Taylor Hollow, the col between it and neighboring Rusk Mountain. As with its eastern neighbor Plateau Mountain, there is a considerable amount of level ground above 3,500 feet (1,067 m), the cutoff elevation for inclusion in the Catskill High Peaks.

The relative steepness of the mountain's north slopes facilitated the growth of the ski area, but have made it an otherwise unattractive route up the mountain (only one of the several trails to the summit comes to it from the north). On the south side, slopes are equally steep and challenging to the southeast. However, a ridge splits off at a level area, known as Devil's Acre, midway along the mountain, rising to a 3,740-foot (1,140 m)) summit unofficially known as Southwest Hunter Mountain. Beyond that ridge, the slopes again steepen, reflecting the glacial cirque between Southwest Hunter and Hunter that opens up into the Spruceton Valley.

The entire mountain is in the Hudson River watershed, with runoff from the north taking a circuitous route to it via Schoharie Creek and the Mohawk River. On the southeast corner, the route is much more direct, as water follows Stony Clove Creek to Esopus Creek and thence to the Hudson. The cirque on the southwest gives rise to a Schoharie tributary, the West Kill, also fed by Hunter Brook. Regardless of the stream, all of Hunter is part of New York City's watershed, as the Esopus is impounded in Ashokan Reservoir and the Schoharie in the similarly named reservoir downstream.

While Hunter is traversed by the Devil's Path hiking trail and is often considered part of the range of the same name, it is distinct from the Devil's Path topographically due to the fork in the range.

== History ==
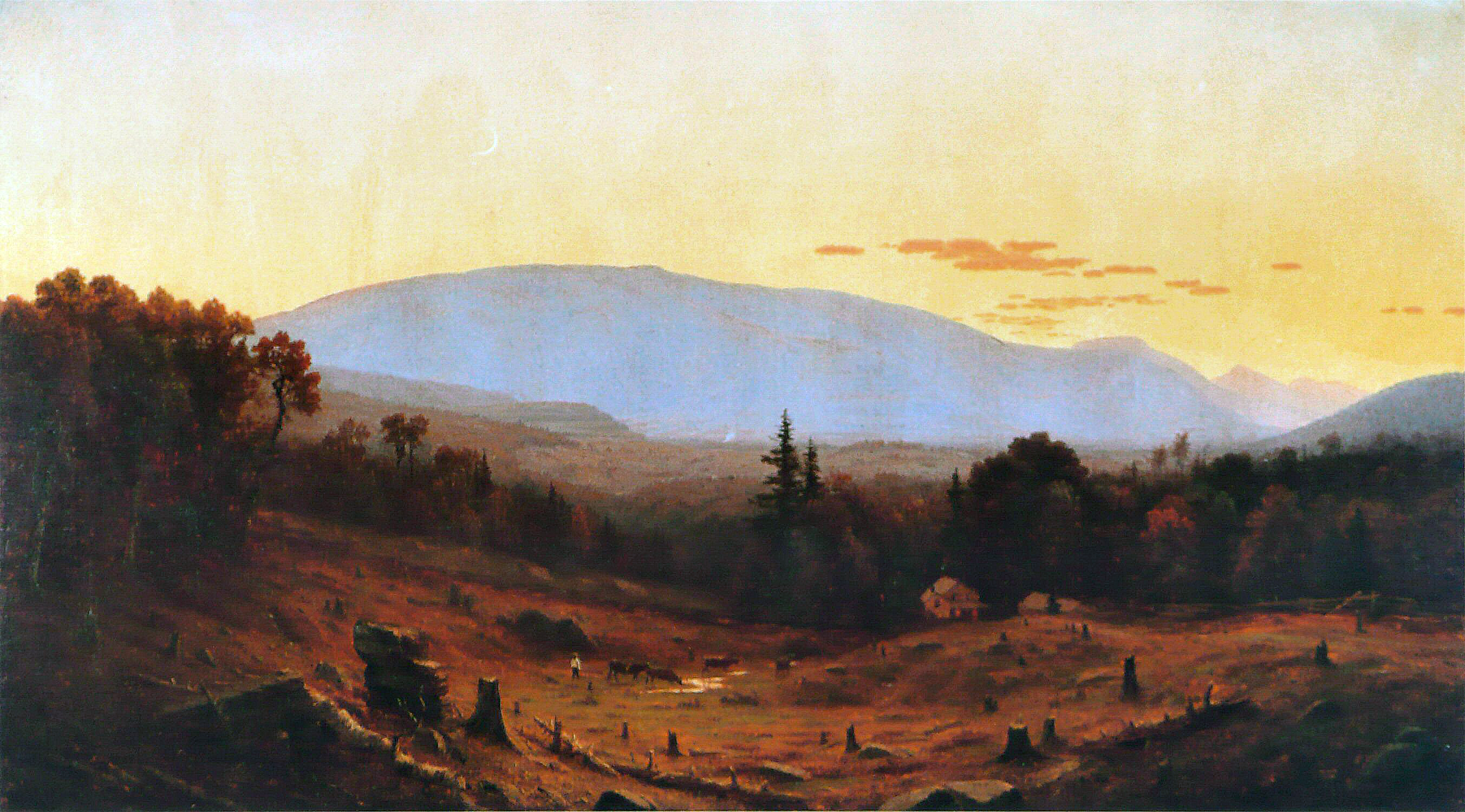
Hunter Mountain, Twilight (1866) by Hudson River School artist Sanford Robinson Gifford, showing the devastation wrought by years of tanbarking and logging.

=== Early years ===
Originally named Greenland Mountain, in the mid-19th century the mountain was renamed. Like the town and the village, Hunter takes its name from John Hunter, a somewhat despised local landlord. It is not known when the mountain was first climbed, or by whom. A popular local legend has it that Hunter, or some other later landowner, went to the summit with a hand level in order to be sure they had indeed purchased the Catskills' highest peak, and were satisfied until an "unknown" peak appeared on the southern horizon — Slide Mountain, the range's true highest peak but not identified as such until 1886 (which makes this legend unlikely to have any basis in fact, as the necessary clearing at the summit for the fire tower was made well afterwards). For a time before Arnold Henry Guyot identified Slide, either Hunter or nearby Black Dome, central peak of the Blackhead Mountains, was thought to be the range's highest, in contrast to the claims of nearby hoteliers for Kaaterskill High Peak.

Hunter, unlike Slide, was located close to settlements and saw considerable exploitation of its forest resources. Retired Colonel William Edwards was so successful harvesting hemlock bark for tanning during the mid-19th century in what is now the ski area that not only was the ridge named the Colonel's Chair in his honor, the village of Hunter was briefly renamed Edwardsville. On the other side of the mountain, the West Virginia-based Fenwick Lumber Company logged Hunter and Southwest Hunter so thoroughly between 1903 and 1917 that it is hard to find virgin forest anywhere in the lands they once owned. Some of the roads and railroads they built on the mountains still serve as trails today, and other remnants of their operations are in the nearby woods.

Gifford Pinchot, first chief of the USFS under Teddy Roosevelt, was named for Hudson River School painter, Sanford Robinson Gifford, after the Pinchot family purchased his famous painting "Hunter Mountain, Twilight."

=== Forest Preserve ===
The establishment of New York's Forest Preserve made it possible for the mountain's forests to renew themselves after years of harvesting by humans. Four years after Fenwick cut down its last tree on Hunter, the state began buying the abandoned tracts, rendering them "forever wild" under the state constitution. By 1929, most of the mountain had been acquired and trails began to be cut, although it would be 1935 before most were finished.

The construction of the ski area put renewed development pressure on the mountain, especially as its owners dynamited areas to create steeper trails. A proposal to amend the state constitution and trade land closer to the summit ridge to the ski area for holdings elsewhere was vigorously opposed by environmentalists and failed to pass the legislature in the early 1990s. Governor George Pataki's 1999 designation of most Catskill High Peaks as a state Bird Conservation Area, to protect Bicknell's thrush and other threatened montane bird species, finally put the idea to rest.

=== Site of key conversation in Clinton impeachment ===
According to the Starr Report, on Memorial Day weekend in 1996, Monica Lewinsky told a family friend, Dale Young, about her affair with President Bill Clinton, during a vacation at a weight-loss spa in the Catskills. This event was later described as the first time she had confided in anyone about the affair. The spa was later identified as Vatra, located near the Becker Hollow trailhead north of Stony Clove Notch. The two were described as being in the middle of a 7.5-mile (12.1 km) hike up Hunter at the time, although it is unknown where they were on the mountain when Lewinsky made her disclosure.

=== Today ===
Currently, Hunter, Rusk and Southwest Hunter mountains are grouped by DEC into the Hunter Mountain Wild Forest, reflecting the extensive past disturbances to the forest. A change proposed in the pending update to the Catskill Park State Land Master Plan (CPSLMP) would combine almost all of that land with the neighboring West Kill Wilderness Area to create a large Hunter-West Kill Wilderness Area. Ironically, the summit of Hunter itself would remain in a thin corridor known as the Rusk Mountain Wild Forest, to accommodate uses of the Spruceton Trail that would not be permitted in a wilderness area.

== Natural environment ==
In addition to the extensive logging operations and ski development, Hunter's forests have been widely affected by forest fires, particularly on the eastern slope above Stony Clove Notch. Catskill forest historian Michael Kudish describes Hunter as the "interior fire capital of the Catskills" since it has almost as much evidence of past burns as the Catskill Escarpment further east. Most, but not all, he believes, were related to the logging operations on the mountain.

This results in the boreal forest at higher elevations on the mountain having a notably higher proportion of paper birch and red spruce to balsam fir compared to Slide and other major Catskill peaks. These pioneering species are often found in areas regenerating themselves (red spruce is also found as an associate to hemlocks at lower elevations near Stony Clove Notch, reflecting the extensive tanbarking there).

According to Kudish, it is clear from a popular viewpoint over Southwest Hunter near a trail junction a short distance east of the summit that there has been a great disturbance in the forest. The many scrubby birches visible on the slopes down to Devil's Acre from here are the result of an extensive 1903 fire. Its telltale red spruce understory and birch canopy are also evident along the long level section of the Devil's Path just under 3,500 feet (1,067 m) leading to the Acre from the east.

The fire damage and steep slope have also led to a small patch of boreal forest growing on the Hunter side of NY 214 as it ascends into Stony Clove Notch. The elevation there is around 2,100 feet (640 m), far lower than such forests are usually found in the Catskills.

== Approaches ==
There are four available routes up Hunter. An unlimited number of trailless routes also, of course, exist but the mountain is rarely bushwhacked. Two offer the possibility of climbing Southwest Hunter on the same trip as well, an option frequently taken by peakbaggers aspiring to join the Catskill Mountain 3500 Club.

=== Spruceton Trail ===
The blue-blazed old road to the fire tower from the southwest is the most commonly used route to the summit. While most who take it do so on foot, it is also blazed for horses and has recently been renovated and slightly rerouted for them. Cross-country skiers also use it in the winter as well.

It begins at a parking area near the end of Spruceton Road (Greene County Route 6), past the point where pavement ends, seven miles (11 km) from NY 42 at West Kill. From the trailhead, 2,083 feet (635 m) above sea level it is 3.4 miles (5.5 km) and vertically 1,957 feet (596 m) to the summit. Facilities for riders to easily mount horses have recently been added to the parking lot.

The road heads north, following Hunter Brook for a short distance, climbing very gently on a somewhat rocky stretch of road until it crosses the brook on a wooden plank bridge. Eventually, 0.5 miles (0.8 km) from the trailhead, it reaches a hairpin turn commonly used as a jumping-off point by hikers beginning the bushwhack up Rusk.

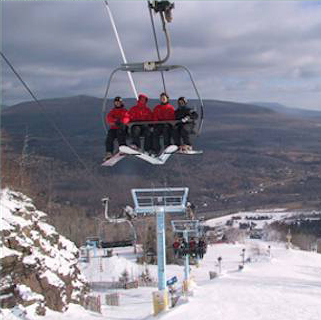
Hunter Mountain chairlift

After these turns, it begins a more pronounced climb up the side of the brook valley, heading more to the northeast. This levels out at about 2,920 feet (890 m) when the road reaches Taylor Hollow, the low point between Hunter and East Rusk. An abandoned road continues north down the hollow to private property in the Schoharie Valley below. It is a wide, grassy clearing, and hitching posts are available for horses that wish to take a break.

The Spruceton Trail begins its toughest section next with a steady climb to the east. This used to be made more difficult by severe erosion and rutting of the trail, but in the early 2000s DEC did extensive trail work that leveled many turns into gentler switchbacks, making it much more accessible for horses.

In the next one-half-mile (0.8 km) it will climb 600 feet (183 m) to a spring where a barrel and a hitching post has been installed (again for the benefit of horses) and the site of the John Robb Lean-to, a popular log shelter that burned from causes still unknown in late 2005. Camping is forbidden here until the new lean-to is built (note - a new lean-to has been constructed as of Dec 2009 with a fireplace, extensive views into the Spruceton valley, and additional designated camping spots). The spring also makes it possible for hikers to only bring one bottle of water and refill at the spring. From the rock outcrops opposite the trail from the lean-to site, there are excellent views to the west of Rusk, West Kill and the Spruceton Valley.

After the lean-to fir and spruce become more pronounced in the surrounding woods, and at about the Colonel's Chair Trail junction the 3,500-foot (1,067 m) line is crossed and the forest becomes boreal. The trail climbs a bit more, then begins long level stretches through the boreal forest with only occasional uphill portions. Drainage is poor in this area, and many hikers are reminded of the Adirondacks by the muddy patches and deep puddles that develop during periods of heavy rainfall. But there are occasional views to the north from outcrops near the trail, and as the summit approaches two short spur trails lead to the north and good-quality reliable springs. The road gets noticeably more winding and steeper as it makes its last climb to the summit.

A loop route can be, and frequently is, made by following the Spruceton Trail to the junction with the yellow-blazed Hunter Mountain Trail, descending to Devil's Acre for the bushwhack to Southwest Hunter, then returning to the Spruceton trailhead via a combination of the western portion of the Devil's Path to West Kill Falls and then the Diamond Notch Trail.

=== Devil's Path and Hunter Mountain Trail ===
The next most popular route starts from the southeast, via the Devil's Path at Stony Clove Notch. The red-blazed trail begins steeply, switching back past some impressive shale cliffs known as the Devil's Portal, then following an old barkpeeler's road through an area where the hemlock are beginning to regenerate and red spruce have sprung up as associates. It returns to a more standard trail at the upper limit of the hemlocks and levels out just under 3,500 feet (1,067 m), a vertical ascent of about 1,500 feet (457 m) in its first one mile (1.6 km).

The next 1.15 miles (1.85 km) is a pleasant, level stroll through the heavily logged areas now dominated by paper birch and red spruce. Just before the Devil's Acre Lean-to, the yellow-blazed Hunter Mountain Trail departs to the north. It reaches the trail junction at the site of the old fire tower after 1.35 miles (2.17 km). From there it is 0.2 miles (0.32 km) to the summit on a level but often wet extension of the Spruceton Trail, for a total hike of 3.7 miles (6 km) and vertical ascent of 2,060 feet (628 m).

This approach also offers the possibility of visiting Southwest Hunter as well as a detour on the return trip.

The summit can also be reached by accessing Devil's Path from the West via either trailhead of the Diamond Notch Trail. This route allows hikers to view the scenic Buttermilk Falls at the junction of Devil's Path & the Diamond Notch Trail.

=== Colonel's Chair Trail from ski area ===
The yellow-blazed Colonel's Chair Trail begins at the ski area's "summit" lodge at the end of the promontory on the eponymous ridge, about 3,300 feet (1,006 m) in elevation. It follows some of the ski area's snowshoe trails, and a short remainder of the former Mossy Brook Trail through this area (eliminated by the ski area's construction) for about 0.75 miles (1.21 km) to the beginning of state land. From there it is a gentle 0.45 miles (0.72 km) walk through boreal forest to the junction with the Spruceton Trail, and 1.2 miles (1.9 km) to the summit.

This route, at 2.3 miles (3.7 km) and 700 feet (213 m) of ascent, is probably the easiest way up Hunter, since the resort runs at least one chairlift to the summit year-round. However, most hikers and peak baggers frown upon claiming the summit this way unless the ski trails are followed from the base, without use of the chairlift. Most of those who use this route to the summit are patrons of the ski area who have rented snowshoes.

=== Becker Hollow Trail ===
The least popular route up Hunter is also the shortest: the Becker Hollow Trail, which begins along Route 214 north of Stony Clove Notch. It is only 2.05 miles (3.3 km) to the summit from here, but the vertical ascent of 2,270 feet (692 m) is the greatest of any approach and as a consequence the trail is infamous for being a continuous upward slope with no level stretches. It can be followed either to the trail junction at the old fire tower site, but a short connector leads past a spring and directly to the summit.

== Summit ==
Hunter's summit is a large clearing dominated by the fire tower and observer's cabin. The former may once again be climbed although the cab at the top is locked save for days when volunteer interpreters go up to help; the latter is locked but may eventually be turned into a small museum as has already happened with nearby Overlook Mountain and Balsam Lake Mountain.

Some hikers have believed the site of the former fire tower to be the actual summit, as the land at that area seems to be higher when viewed from the fire tower. However, this is an optical illusion similar to that experienced at the top of Mount Davis, Pennsylvania's highest peak, where lower bumps on the same ridge appear higher since there is nothing nearby for the eye to establish perspective with.

A flat rock near the fire tower (and visible when looking down from it) indicates north, with the words "4040 FT" on it. It may be the actual high point, but it is hard to tell since like so many other Catskill summits Hunter is wide and flat.

Hitching racks, and a mounting platform similar to the one at the Spruceton trailhead, have been built and/or renovated recently.

=== Fire tower ===
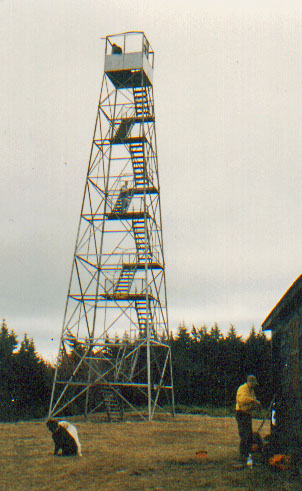
Actual summit of Hunter Mountain, with fire tower, in 1999, before renovations. The cab is currently boarded up.

A wooden fire tower had been in existence at the summit since the state's Forest, Fish and Game Commission built it in 1909, during Fenwick's logging operations, but once those ended it was replaced by a steel one in 1917, then the current one in 1953. At that time, the location of the tower was changed from a smaller clearing 0.2 miles (320 m) east of the summit to its current location. The footings at this location, a trail junction, are still visible and sometimes cause confusion as to whether this is, in fact, the mountain's actual summit.

Despite being closed after fire lookouts were no longer needed in 1990, its staircase and cab remained easily accessible to visitors and it was frequently climbed to provide a 360-degree view not normally found in the Catskills. Later, the New York State Department of Environmental Conservation (DEC), which administers the Forest Preserve, decided that instead of tearing it down matching funds should be raised from the nearby communities to renovate and reopen it, along with the other four remaining towers in the Catskills, to educate the public and enhance its understanding of the Forest Preserve. In 1997 it was further protected when it was added to the National Register of Historic Places, and after renovations it was reopened to the public in 2000. The box used by rangers at the top of the tower has since been padlocked and boarded up.
