= Notch Lake =

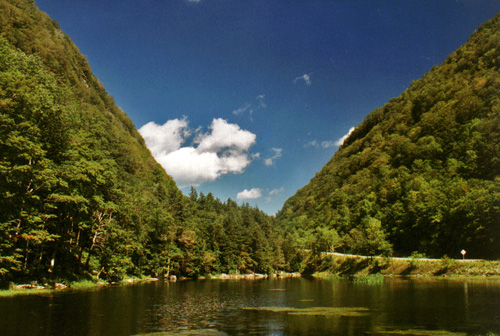

- Location within New York
- Location: Edgewood, New York
- Coordinates: 42°09′37″N 74°12′12″W
- Type: artificial lake
- Primary outflows: Stony Clove Creek
- Basin countries: United States

Notch Lake is an artificial lake in Edgewood, New York, in the Town of Hunter in the Catskill Mountains. It is located near the Stony Clove Notch, and is located near the edge of the Devil's Tombstone Campsite, bordering New York State Route 214. There is also a parking lot near the shore. It is the beginning of the Stony Clove Creek.

One thing unusual about it is that it is one of the few places in the Catskills where there is a patch of Boreal Forest growing at an elevation below 3,000 feet (910 m). A fire occurred near the northern shore in the 1990s.

Camping is not allowed at the day-use area next to the parking lot and Pond, however, camping is allowed a short walk South along Route 214 at the Devil's Tombstone Campground.
