= Diamond Notch =

- Location within New York
- Elevation: 2,671 feet (814 m)
- Traversed by: Diamond Notch Trail

Third Approach
- Location: Greene County, New York
- Range: Catskill Mountains
- Coordinates: 42°10′05″N 74°15′26″W
- Topo map: Lexington

Diamond Notch is a wind gap located between West Kill Mountain and Southwest Hunter Mountain in the Catskills of New York. The south side of Diamond Notch drains through Diamond Notch Hollow via Hollow Tree Brook to Stony Clove Creek, thence to Esopus Creek and the Hudson River. Water from the north side also reaches the Hudson, but via a longer route—first the West Kill, then Schoharie Creek to the Mohawk, the Hudson's largest tributary.
