= Hicks Locomotive and Car Works =

Rolling stock manufacturer

The Hicks Locomotive and Car Works was a railway equipment manufacturer located in the Chicago area, operating during the early 20th century. It stayed in business for only 21 years.

== History ==
Hicks Locomotive and Car Works was founded in 1897 by Frank M. Hicks, who had owned an ironmaking company called F.M. Hicks and Company for ten years. Originally the new company was focused on purchasing used steam locomotives and refurbishing them for continued operation, but it quickly branched out into passenger car and freight car construction.

Construction expanded for the first ten years of the company's life, and in 1905 the Car Works claimed the ability to manufacture 10 railroad coaches per month and 25 freight cars per day in addition to its locomotive rebuilding activities. The size of the workforce varied considerably but normally the company employed at least 100 men.

Near the end of the first decade of the century, orders for railway cars slowed and the company went into decline. In 1910 the company suffered two major fires, causing severe financial hardship. In September of that year the company was forced into receivership and was sold in February 1911. The purchaser, William Barbour of New York, changed the name to Central Locomotive and Car Works and continued the company's operations.

In the 1910s the company continued its slow decline, and the last of the 480 passenger cars built at the Chicago Heights works was constructed in 1914. In 1916 there were two more fires at the plant. Two years later, Central went bankrupt and ceased operations. The plant was sold to the Liberty Car and Equipment Company.

== Physical Plant ==
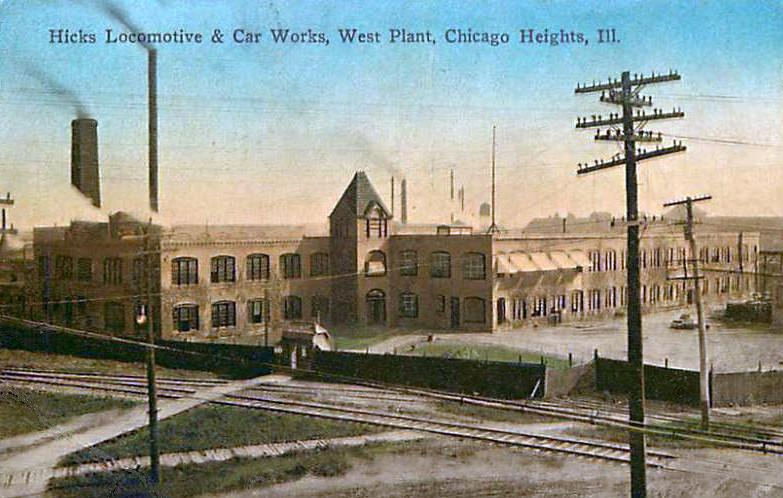
The Chicago Heights plant West Works.

The company's offices were originally located in the Fisher Building in Chicago's Loop district while the plant was located 30 miles to the south in Chicago Heights, Illinois. In 1905 the company's offices were moved to Chicago Heights.

The Chicago Heights plant consisted of two main complexes. The older of the two was the West Works, or locomotive shop, which dated to 1901. This plant included a machine shop, erection shop, boiler shop, blacksmith shop, coach shop, mill, upholstery workshop, tender shop, tin shop, veneer shop, and pattern shop. It also included a storehouse. The West Shop was used for building and repairing passenger cars and for rebuilding steam locomotives.

The newer complex, the East Works, was an adjacent tube mill purchased by the company in 1905. After conversion this plant included a wood machine shop, truck shop, storehouse, blacksmith shop, boiler house, oil house and two erection shops. This plant was used for construction and repair of freight cars and opened in 1906.

In 1910 there were two fires. In the first, the west plant burned down, while the second fire destroyed the offices and storehouse. The East Works survived the bankruptcy of both Hicks and Central and was bought in 1918 by Liberty Car and Equipment.

== Surviving Traces ==
None of the buildings of the Chicago Heights plant have survived, and the site is an empty lot. The Fisher Building in downtown Chicago survives and is an historic landmark. One freight car built by Hicks survives in Goldfield NV, and nine wooden passenger cars have been preserved:

- Chicago Aurora and Elgin 309 (1907 electric interurban coach), at the Illinois Railway Museum
- Green Bay and Western 20 (mail-baggage car), privately owned near Rapid River, Michigan
- Green Bay and Western 21 (1908 mail-baggage car), at the National Railroad Museum
- Kewaunee Green Bay and Western 76 (mail express car), privately owned near Baraboo, Wisconsin
- Kewaunee Green Bay and Western 77 (1909 mail-baggage car), at the Mid-Continent Railway Museum
- Lake Superior and Ishpeming 63 (1910 combination baggage-coach), at the National Railroad Museum
- Munising Railway 64 (1910 coach), at the Mid-Continent Railway Museum
- Virginia and Truckee 20 (1907 combination baggage-coach), at the Orange Empire Railway Museum
- Yosemite Valley 330 (1907 parlor-observation), at the Niles Canyon Railway

In addition, Hicks purchased four Jackson & Sharp Co. narrow gauge coaches from the Ulster & Delaware R.R. between August 1899 & June 1900 and resold them to the White Pass and Yukon Route in May 1901 (WP&YR ##218, 220, 222, and 224). These four cars have been rebuilt several times under White Pass ownership and remain in service.
