= West Kill Mountain =

Mountain in the United States

- Location within New York Location within the United States

Highest point
- Elevation: 3880+ ft (1183+ m) NGVD 29
- Prominence: 1,220 ft (370 m)
- Listing: Catskill High Peaks 6th
- Coordinates: 42°10′04″N 74°17′23″W

Geography
- Location: Greene County, New York
- Parent range: Devil's Path
- Topo map: USGS Lexington

West Kill Mountain, or Westkill Mountain, is located in Greene County, New York. The mountain is named after the West Kill stream which flows along its northern side, and is part of the Devil's Path range of the Catskill Mountains. To the east, West Kill Mountain faces Southwest Hunter Mountain across 800-foot-deep (240 m) Diamond Notch; to the west, West Kill faces North Dome across Mink Hollow.

West Kill Mountain stands within the watershed of the Hudson River, which drains into New York Bay. The north slopes drain into the West Kill, thence into Schoharie Creek, the Mohawk River, and the Hudson River. The southeast slopes of the mountain drain into Hollow Tree Brook, thence into Stony Clove Creek, Esopus Creek, and the Hudson River. The southwest slopes of West Kill Mountain drain into the Broadstreet Hollow stream, thence into Esopus Creek.

West Kill Mountain is contained within the Westkill Mountain Wilderness Area of New York's Catskill State Park.

== See also ==
- List of mountains in New York
