= Hunter Synagogue =

Historic synagogue in Hunter, New York, United States

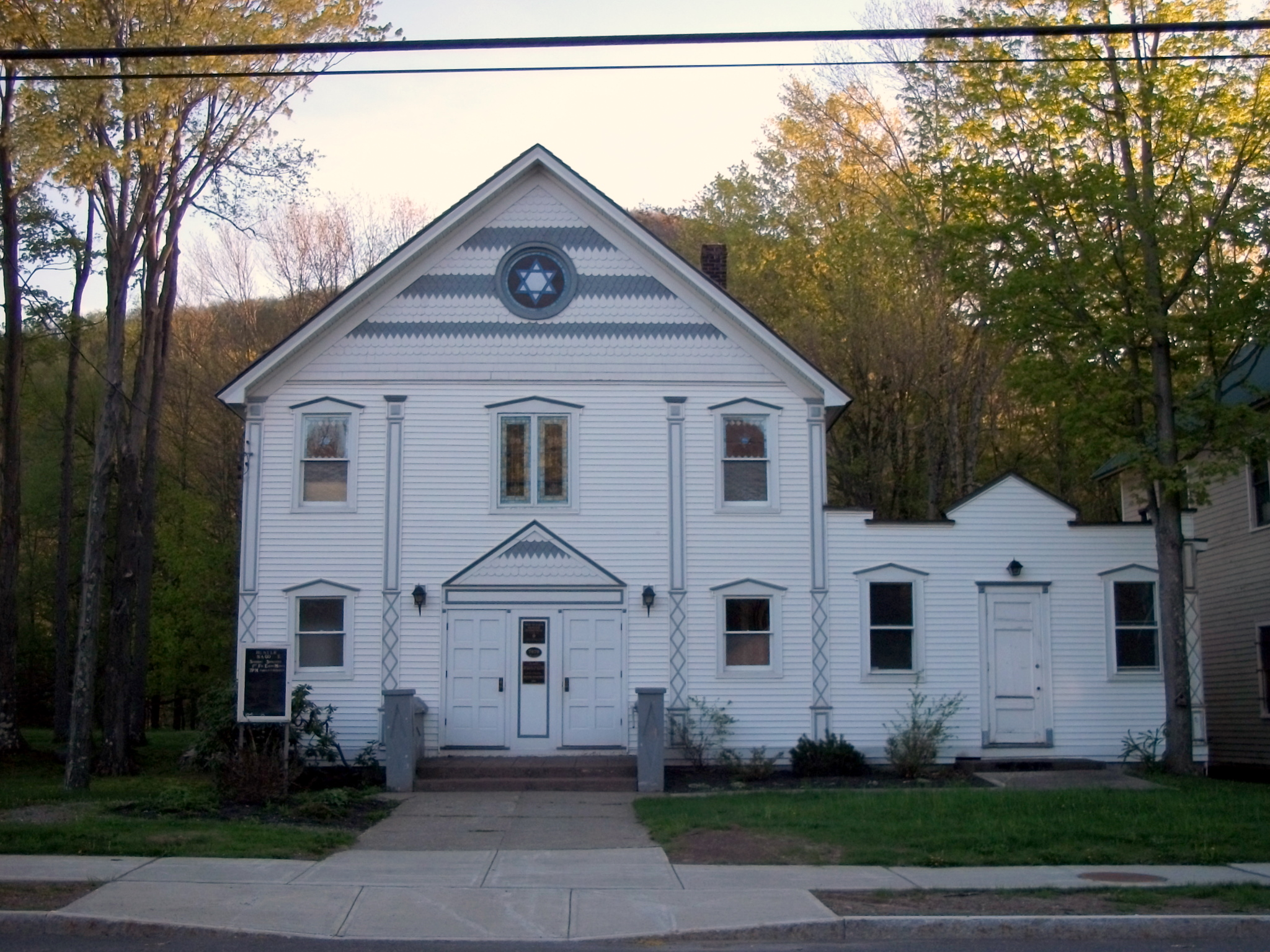
- The synagogue, in 2010

- Location in New York

Religion
- Affiliation: Judaism
- Rite: Nusach Ashkenaz
- Ecclesiastical or organisational status: Synagogue
- Leadership: Lay-led
- Status: Active

Location
- Location: 7879 Main Street, Hunter, New York 12442
- Country: United States
- Coordinates: 42°12′38″N 74°12′57″W

Architecture
- Type: Synagogue architecture
- Style: Queen Anne
- Completed: 1914
- Materials: Timber

Website
- huntersynagogue.org
- Hunter Synagogue
- U.S. National Register of Historic Places
- Area: less than one acre
- NRHP reference No.: 99001484
- Added to NRHP: December 9, 1999

Hunter Synagogue is a historic Jewish congregation and synagogue at 7879 Main Streetin Hunter, Greene County, New York, in the United States.

The synagogue was constructed between 1909 and 1914 and is a 2 1/2-story, three-by-seven-bay, Queen Anne–inspired building. Also on the property is a shed built about 1910.

It was added to the National Register of Historic Places in 1999.
