= Hunter (village), New York =

Hunter, New York
- Village
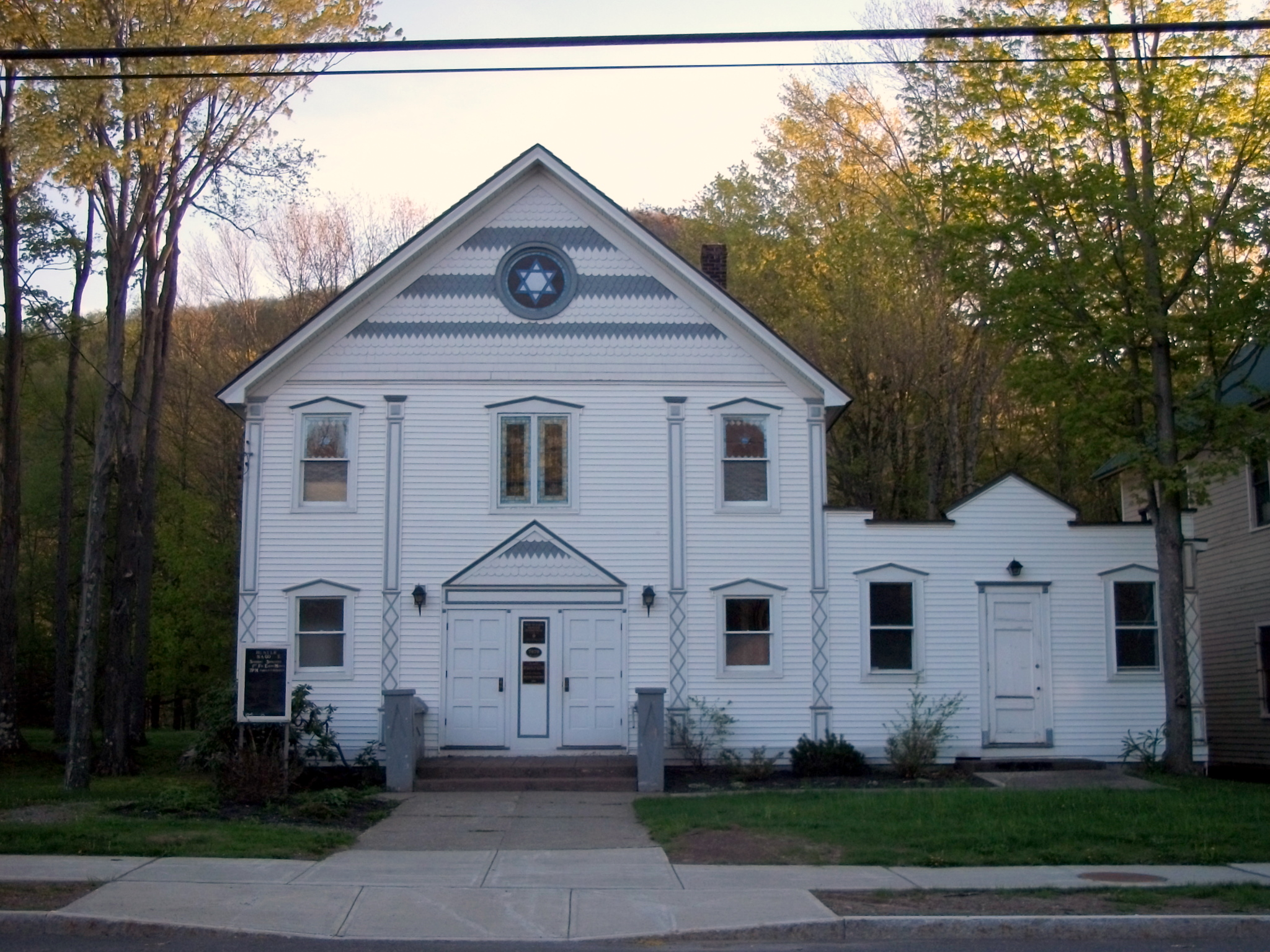
- Hunter Synagogue

- Location within New York Location within the United States
- Coordinates: 42°12′49″N 74°13′9″W
- Country: United States
- State: New York
- County: Greene
- Town: Hunter

Area
  - Total: 1.88 sq mi (4.88 km^{2})
  - Land: 1.85 sq mi (4.80 km^{2})
  - Water: 0.031 sq mi (0.08 km^{2})
- Elevation: 1,588 ft (484 m)

Population (2020)
  - Total: 429
  - Density: 231.4/sq mi (89.36/km^{2})
- Time zone: UTC-5 (Eastern (EST))
  - Summer (DST): UTC-4 (EDT)
- ZIP code: 12442
- Area code: 518
- FIPS code: 36-36167
- GNIS feature ID: 0953467
- Website: villageofhunterny.com

Hunter is a village in Greene County, New York, United States. The population was 429 at the 2020 census. The village is in the northwestern part of the town of Hunter on New York State Route 23A.

== History ==
The community was initially called "Edwardsville" after William Edwards, who founded the village by building a tannery there. The village was incorporated in 1896.

== Geography ==
Hunter is located in western Greene County at 42°12′30″N 74°12′50″W (42.208549, −74.21398), within the Catskill Mountains, in the valley of Schoharie Creek. New York State Route 23A is the village's Main Street, leading east 5 miles (8 km) to Tannersville and 21 miles (34 km) to Catskill. To the west NY 23A leads down Schoharie Creek 15 miles (24 km) to Prattsville.

According to the United States Census Bureau, the village has a total area of 1.8 square miles (4.6 km^{2}), of which 1.7 square miles (4.5 km^{2}) is land and 0.04 square miles (0.1 km^{2}), or 1.81%, is water.

== Demographics ==
Historical population
Census	Pop.	Note	%±
1880	481		—
1890	699		45.3%
1900	431		−38.3%
1910	408		−5.3%
1920	683		67.4%
1930	624		−8.6%
1940	626		0.3%
1950	526		−16.0%
1960	457		−13.1%
1970	238		−47.9%
1980	511		114.7%
1990	429		−16.0%
2000	490		14.2%
2010	502		2.4%
2020	429		−14.5%
U.S. Decennial Census

As of the census of 2000, there were 490 people, 238 households, and 123 families residing in the village. The population density was 303.0 inhabitants per square mile (117.0/km^{2}). There were 639 housing units at an average density of 395.1 per square mile (152.5/km^{2}). The racial makeup of the village was 98.37% White, 0.41% Black or African American, 0.20% Asian, 0.41% from other races, and 0.61% from two or more races. Hispanic or Latino of any race were 2.04% of the population.

There were 238 households, out of which 23.9% had children under the age of 18 living with them, 37.4% were married couples living together, 9.7% had a female householder with no husband present, and 48.3% were non-families. 44.1% of all households were made up of individuals, and 14.7% had someone living alone who was 65 years of age or older. The average household size was 2.06 and the average family size was 2.87.

In the village, the population was spread out, with 23.3% under the age of 18, 3.7% from 18 to 24, 25.1% from 25 to 44, 31.2% from 45 to 64, and 16.7% who were 65 years of age or older. The median age was 44 years. For every 100 females, there were 104.2 males. For every 100 females age 18 and over, there were 103.2 males.

The median income for a household in the village was $32,500, and the median income for a family was $48,500. Males had a median income of $35,625 versus $22,188 for females. The per capita income for the village was $20,100. About 9.4% of families and 15.5% of the population were below the poverty line, including 22.4% of those under age 18 and 10.8% of those age 65 or over.

== Points of interest ==
Hunter Mountain is the highest peak in the county and the second highest in the Catskills. The mountain is the site of Hunter Mountain ski area which is open for skiing and tubing in the winter, and biking, sightseeing and hiking in the summer. The ski resort is the largest employer in the village, which was run by the Slutzky family, followed by Peak Resorts but is now run by Vail Resorts in the heart of Hunter. The seasonal nature of the mountain regulates the economic activity of the town.

Hunter hosts Camp Loyaltown, a summer camp that was created specifically for people who have disabilities, such as autism, cerebral palsy, and Down syndrome. More than 650 visitors participate in it every year, and the camp hires temporary staff from other countries.

Camp Jened, a summer camp for disabled people with a broader range of physical and cognitive disabilities than Camp Loyaltown, was located on Ski Bowl Road in the second half of the 20th century. It was a major focal point for the disability rights movement and independent living movement.

The Hunter Synagogue is a historic building from 1914 that is in the National Register of Historic Places.
