= Elka Park, New York =

- Hamlet
- Location within New York Location within the United States
- Coordinates: 42°09′33″N 74°09′27″W
- Country: United States
- State: New York
- County: Greene
- Elevation: 2,178 ft (664 m)
- Time zone: UTC-5 (Eastern (EST))
  - Summer (DST): UTC-4 (EDT)
- ZIP code: 12427
- Area codes: 518 & 838
- GNIS feature ID: 949499

Elka Park is a hamlet in Greene County, New York, United States. The community is 2.8 miles (4.5 km) south-southwest of Tannersville. Elka Park has a post office with ZIP code 12427, which opened on August 9, 1893.
