= Hunter Mountain (ski area) =

Ski area in New York, United States

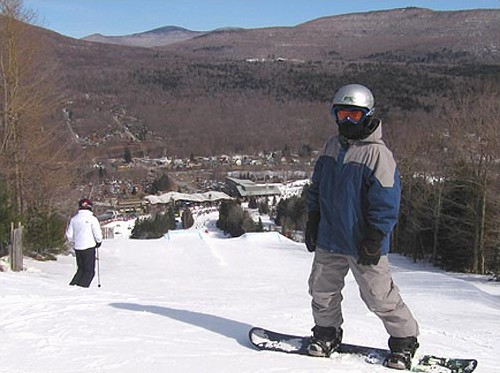
- Snowboarder at Hunter Mountain
- Interactive map of Hunter Mountain
- Location: Hunter, New York, U.S.
- Mountain: Hunter Mountain (New York)
- Nearest city: Kingston, New York, U.S.
- Coordinates: 42.200278°N 74.230278°W
- Status: Operating
- Owner: Vail Resorts
- Vertical: 1,600 feet (490 m)
- Top elevation: 3,200 ft (975 m)
- Base elevation: 1,600 ft (488 m)
- Skiable area: 320 acres (130 ha)
- Trails: 67, beginner 25%, intermediate 30%, advanced 30%, expert 15%
- Longest run: 2 mi (3.2 km)
- Lift system: 13 chairlifts; 1 Carpet Lift; 1 Pony Lift
- Lift capacity: 19,390 passengers/hr
- Terrain parks: 4
- Snowfall: 120 in (305 cm) annual average
- Snowmaking: Yes
- Night skiing: No
- Website: https://www.huntermtn.com

Hunter Mountain is a ski resort located in Greene County, New York about three hours northwest of New York City in the town of Hunter, New York. It features a 1,600-foot (488 m) vertical drop.

From its inception in the late 1950s, the management of Hunter Mountain has employed extensive snowmaking facilities.

The resort offers snow tubing as well as skiing. Hunter Mountain also features four terrain parks and holds freestyle events throughout the ski season.

== History ==
During the mid-1950s a group of local businessmen, including Orville Slutzky, Karl Plattner Sr. and Israel Slutzky, developed plans to revive the area's economy after the Great Depression, World War II, and the decline of Catskills tourism had caused long-term economic distress. The sport of skiing was becoming popular, and the group considered developing Hunter Mountain as a ski resort. After a failed lobbying attempt to get the state to develop a new ski area on Hunter Mountain, the group contacted Denise McCluggage, a sports editor at the New York Herald Tribune. They told her they had a mountain to give away to any developer who would build a ski area called Hunter Mountain on it. McCluggage wrote an article that attracted the interest of a group of Broadway show-business people.

This group created the Hunter Mountain Development Corp., which was the first operator of Hunter Mountain. Headed by James Hammerstein, the son of Oscar Hammerstein II, the group included many Hollywood and Broadway stars of the time. With Orville and Izzy Slutzky providing most of the land and their firm I. & O.A. Slutzky providing the construction, the ground was broken to develop the ski area in the summer of 1959. The area was given to the group to operate with two stipulations: that it be called "Hunter Mountain Ski Bowl" and that it has snowmaking capabilities, which was a relatively new technology at the time.

On January 9, 1960, Hunter Mountain opened for the first time with the original "B" Lift in operation. The original "A" Lift was under construction and was not completed in time for the first season. The old Starr Hotel served as the first base lodge, located just below the old Ski and Snowboard School administration building. When the Hunter Mountain Development Corp. went bankrupt by the middle of the 1961/62 season the Slutzky brothers took over the operation.

During the summer of 1962, the "A" lift was completed. This opened up the skiing to the summit. Over the next several years, many new trails were cut, including the opening of the Belt Parkway and the construction of the Upper Shop, and more snow-making was installed. In the summer of 1963, Hunter opened for summer skiing on plastic chips. Summer skiing lasted only a few years. During the winter of 1963/64, Hunter Mountain opened for night skiing for the first time. Night skiing was discontinued in 1972.

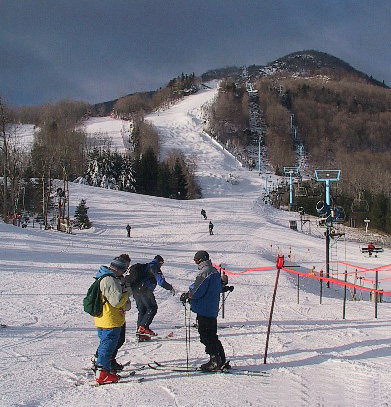
Hunter Mountain

In the summer of 1964, construction of the present-day base lodge began, which opened on December 12, 1964, featuring a 300-seat dining room, an indoor swimming pool, sauna, health club, and massage rooms. The "D" Lift opened in December 1967, the first triple chair at Hunter Mountain. Also that winter, Hunter Mountain became the first area in the world with a summit to base snow-making with the completion of snow-making lines to the summit. Also at this time, the "East Side" was developed including K-27 (38–44 degrees, steepest run on the mountain), East Side Drive, and The Milky Way.

In the summer of 1969, construction of the trails on Hunter West began. It was opened with the "Z" Lift for the season. That summer, the Summit Lodge was constructed. The first Hunter Summer Festival took place in July 1975 with the ten-day German Alps Festival. Under the direction of Don Conover and his family, the festivals grew steadily each year thereafter. The Colonel's Hall was added to the base lodge in the summer of 1977. In addition, the Mini-Lodge in Hunter One was constructed. The Mini-Lodge has since been removed. In 1980, Hunter Mountain became the first ski area in the world to feature snow-making on 100 percent of its trails.

December 1983 saw the opening of the Sushi Bar in the Summit Lounge. In the summer of 1987, The SnowLite Express Quad was built along with the West Wing and CopperTree Restaurant addition to the base lodge.

In 1989, Hunter became the first area in the U.S. to install an automated snow-making system. The system installed on Racer's Edge by York International was and still is operated remotely from the Upper Shop. This year also saw the completion of the first lift side condominiums. Construction and development continued into the '90s, with lifts, trails, and shops added to the complex. During summer 2010, the resort acknowledged the need to replace the aging Snowlite Express and decided that a high-speed six-person chairlift from Leitner-Poma would be the replacement. It was completed by opening day for the 2010–11 season. Also new to the season were the Mid-Mountain Tour and the Adventure Tower, operated by Zipline New York. 150 new snow guns were also added for the 2010–11 season. The summer of 2011 also saw some major changes, including another 150 new snow guns and miscellaneous improvements to the Empire Park terrain parks. The biggest improvement was the reinstallation of Snowlite as the Zephyr Express on the west side of the mountain to replace the Z and Y lifts.

The original owner Orville Slutzky died on April 18, 2013, at the age of 96. Hunter Mountain operated for a few more family-owned years.

In late November 2015, it was announced that Peak Resorts would acquire Hunter Mountain, ending the 50+ year run of the original owners. The 36 million dollar transaction was completed by the end of the year.

On April 5, 2018, the Hunter North Expansion was announced. It includes 9 new runs, consisting of 5 trails and 4 glades, a new high-speed six-person chairlift located below the Belt Parkway, and Way Out trails covers approximately 1,000 vertical feet. The expansion increased Hunter Mountain's skiable acreage by 33 percent, and also adds an entirely new entrance and parking lot with space for up to 250 more vehicles. Construction on the expansion, which officially began on April 16, 2018, was completed as of Christmas Eve, December 24, 2018, and was opened to the public with a ribbon-cutting ceremony and grand opening at 8:30 am the very same morning. As of its debut, Hunter Mountain's increase in acreage and terrain was reported as the largest ski resort expansion on the east coast of the United States in over 15 years. The addition of a second high-speed six-passenger chairlift, the Northern Express, makes Hunter Mountain the only ski resort in New York State to feature two 6-passenger chairlifts. In the first two months of operation, three skiers died on new trails in the expansion area.

During July 2019 Peak Resorts was acquired by Vail Resorts, the transaction closed on September 24, 2019. The 2019–20 season enabled Hunter to accept Epic Passes, with the 2020–21 season having RFID cards being checked by handheld scanners.

In 2024, Vail Resorts made major improvements to Hunter Mountain for the upcoming 2024-25 winter season, with the main focus being the replacement of the resort's B Lift, known as "Broadway", with a high speed six pack. The original B Lift was reinstalled on Hunter East as the Otis lift, replacing the aging E Lift. They also made investments into the resort's snowmaking capabilities, adding a total 141 automated snow guns to the mountain.

== Lifts ==
- Hunter Mountain has nine chairlifts, and 2 magic carpets.

Name	Type	Manufacturer	Built	Capacity (per Hour)	Vertical (feet)	Length (feet)	Notes
Broadway Express	High Speed Six	Leitner-Poma	2024	3050	534	2979	
Kaatskill Flyer	High Speed Six	Leitner-Poma	2010	2600	1477	5400	Main lift out of Hunter Mountain Base are.
Northern Express	High Speed Six	Leitner-Poma	2018	2400	1030	3245	
Zephyr Express	High Speed Quad	Poma	2011	2000	1295	3800	Originally installed in the same location as the Kaatskill Flyer in 1987 as the "Snowlite Express". Relocated to Hunter West in 2011.
C 20th Century	Quad	Poma	1996	1800	171	1393	
F Lift	Triple	Poma	1984	1800	1010	2950	
D Lift	Double	Poma	1966	1800	900	3500	Converted from a Triple to a Double in 2019, with Partek chairs.
H Lift	Double	Heron-Poma	1972	1200	205	1793	
Otis	Quad	Poma	2024	1800	400	2148	Originally installed as Broadway in 1996. Relocated to Hunter East in 2024.
Highlands Poma	Platter	Poma	400	-	-	-	-

== Snowmaking ==
- 1967: Hunter became the first area in the world to feature summit to base snowmaking
- 1980: First area to achieve 100% snowmaking coverage
- 2006: Over 1,100 snow machines installed. Most of the snowguns are mounted on towers to ensure the maximum amount of "air time" for falling snow to freeze. Hunter has enough air and water available to run half of the snowmaking arsenal at once under marginal snowmaking conditions.
- 2014: New pumping system added.
- 2015: Automated snowmaking added to Hellgate, 7th Avenue, Kennedy Drive, and Fifth Avenue, automating a full top-to-bottom run. Previously, only Racer's Edge had automated snowmaking. New air compressor replaced original 60+ year old system.
- 2024: Added a total of 141 automated snow guns to the resort

== Grooming ==
Hunter Mountain's grooming fleet consists of four LMC 4700s and three Pisten Bully Edges for normal grooming operations, in addition to a PB300 Winch Cat for grooming steeper slopes. A Pisten Bully (Snowcat) Park Bully and Pipe Magician used in the Empire Park and Half Pipe round out Hunter's grooming fleet. Hunter also has one LMC 3900 for use in the Snowtubing park.

Each grooming machine is equipped with flexible roto-tillers which produce a more consistent, smooth surface than straight tillers. The concept of the flex tiller originated at Hunter Mountain and was realized through a joint effort between LMC and Hunter Mountain. Flexible tillers are now used worldwide. Hunter still owns and operates the first two-piece and three-piece snow tillers ever produced, as well as the only four-piece tiller ever made.
