= Off-trail hiking =

Type of hiking not involving a trail

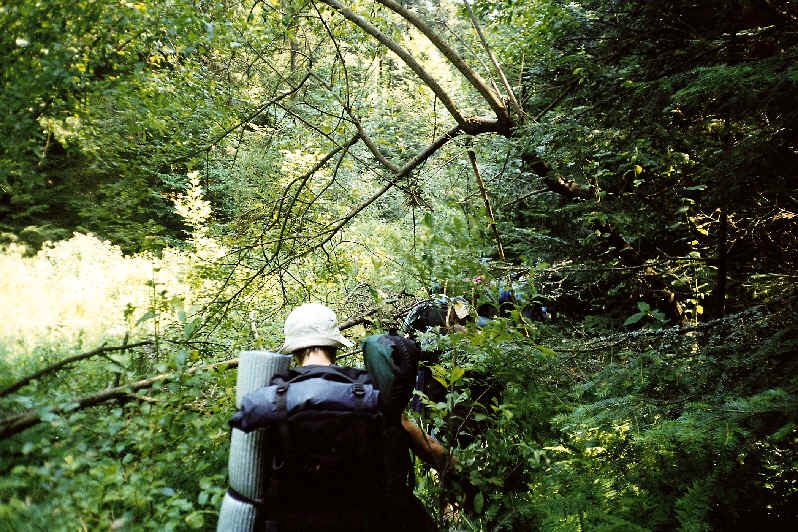
Off-trail hiking in the Polish Carpathians

Off-trail hiking is a form of hiking in which a hiker relies on tools such as topographical maps, a compass and a GPS unit rather than following a trail. It is also known as bushwhacking.

There is concern that off-trail hiking can cause trailbraiding (creating multiple paths which can damage vegetation), erosion, new trail creation, and other negative environmental impacts. The off-trail community says that the activity is limited to open, unrestricted public areas where it is permitted.

== See also ==
- Orienteering
- Scrambling
- Right to roam
