= Hunter, New York =

- Town
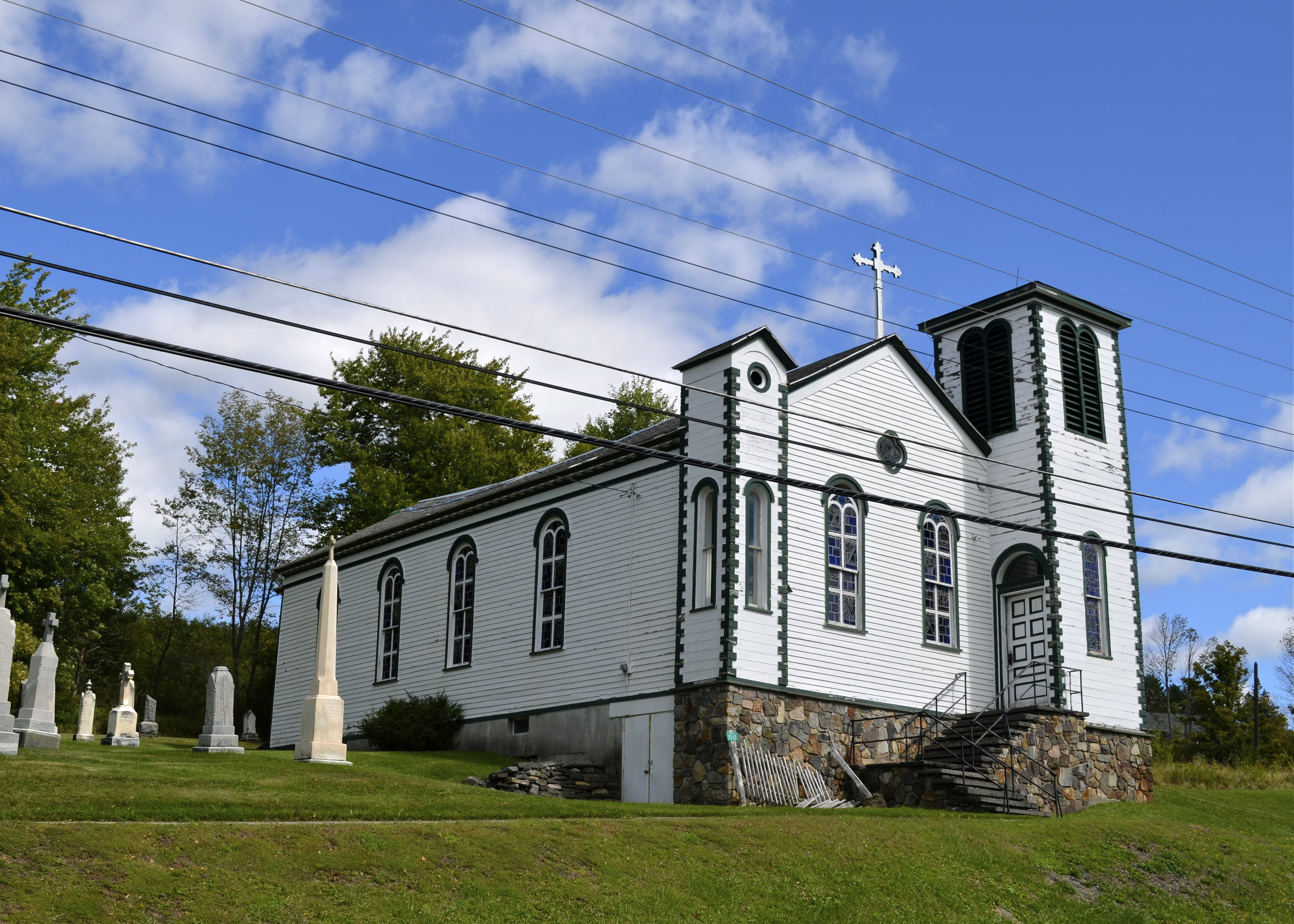
- Mary of the Mountain Church in Hunter

- Location in Greene County and the state of New York.

- Location of New York in the United States
- Coordinates: 42°12′31″N 74°12′50″W
- Country: United States
- State: New York
- County: Greene

Government
  - Town supervisor: Sean Mahoney (R)
  - Town council: Members: Dolph J. Semenza; David Kukle; Raymond W. Legg; Ernest Reale

Area
  - Total: 90.21 sq mi (233.65 km^{2})
  - Land: 89.89 sq mi (232.82 km^{2})
  - Water: 0.32 sq mi (0.83 km^{2})

Population (2020)
  - Total: 3,035
  - Density: 33.76/sq mi (13.04/km^{2})
- Time zone: UTC−5 (EST)
  - Summer (DST): UTC−4 (EDT)
- ZIP Codes: 12442 (Hunter); 12427 (Elka Park); 12436 (Haines Falls); 12450 (Lanesville); 12485 (Tannersville)
- Area code: 518
- FIPS code: 36-039-36178
- Website: https://townofhunterny.gov/

Hunter is a town located in Greene County, New York, United States. The population was 3,035 at the time of the 2020 census. The town contains two villages, one named Hunter on the west, and the second called Tannersville, as well as a number of hamlets such as Haines Falls, Platte Clove, Lanesville and Edgewood. Additionally, there are three residential parks location within town limits: Onteora Park, Twilight Park and Elka Park. The town is on the southern border of Greene County and abuts the towns of Woodstock and Saugerties, located in Ulster County.

== History ==
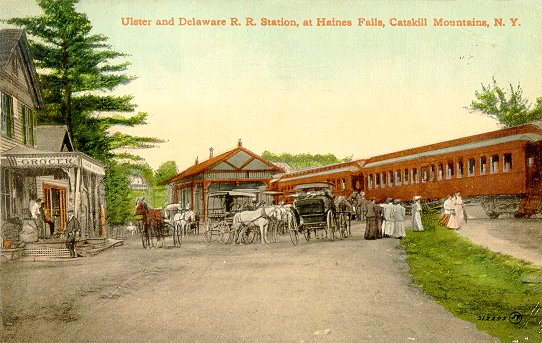
Haines Falls Railroad Station ca. 1900

The town was formed on January 27, 1813, from the town of Windham, but was then called "Edwardsville". The name of "Hunter" was assumed in 1814, named after John Hunter. Afterwards, the town lost some territory to Saugerties in 1814 and to Jewett in 1849.

The area became a popular tourism destination in the late 19th and early 20th centuries. It was served by the Ulster and Delaware Railroad, which brought tourists to resort towns throughout the Catskill Mountains.

== Geography ==
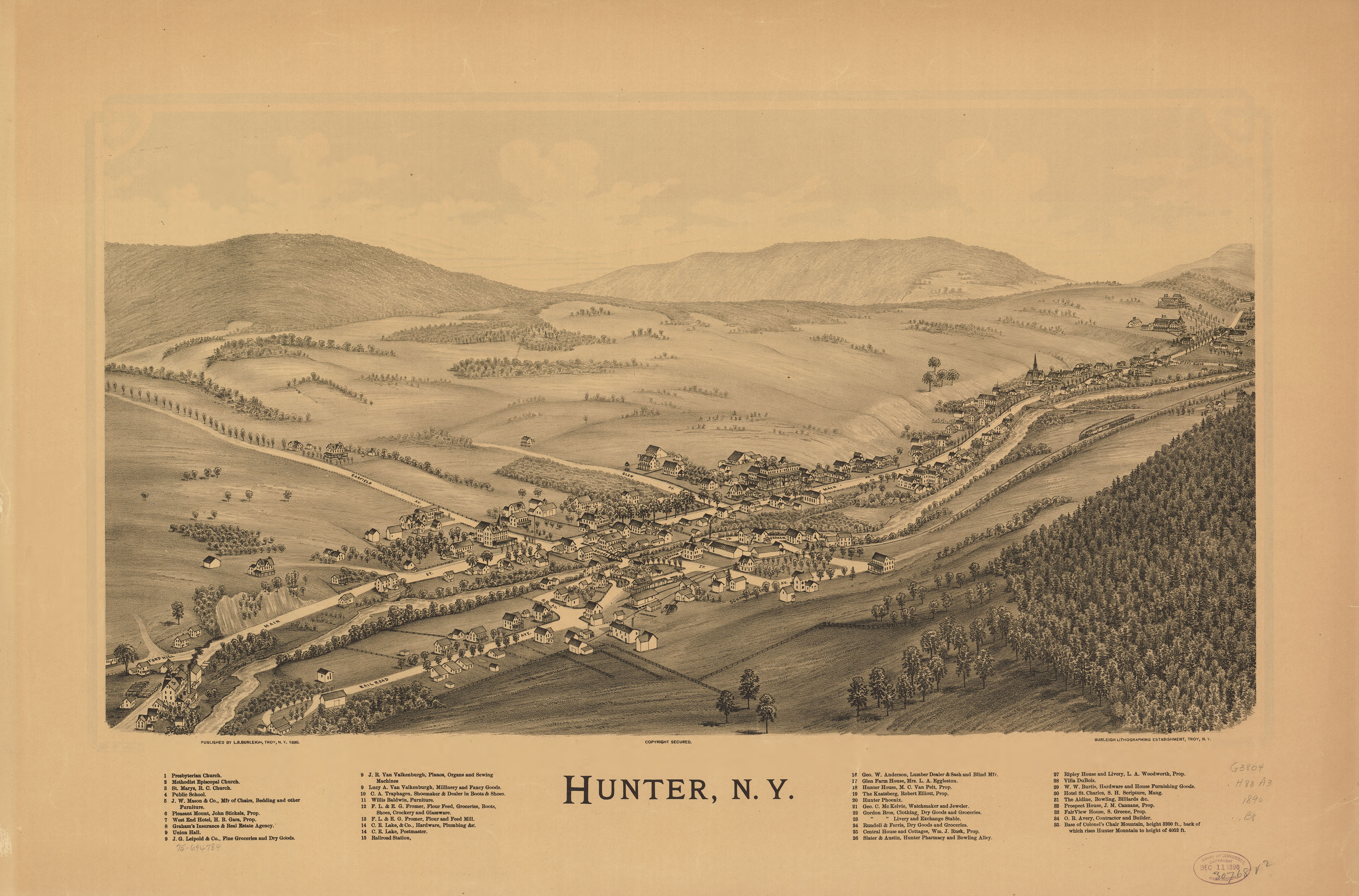
Perspective map and list of landmarks published in 1890 by L.R Burleigh

According to the United States Census Bureau, the town has a total area of 90.7 square miles (235.0 km^{2}), of which 90.4 square miles (234.3 km^{2}) is land and 0.3 square miles (0.7 km^{2}, or 0.31%) is water.

The southern town line and part of the eastern town boundary are the border of Ulster County. The town is in the Catskill Mountains and the Catskill Park. Many of the Catskill High Peaks, including Hunter Mountain, a 4040-foot mountain that is the highest in the county and the second-highest in the Catskills (after Slide Mountain), are in the town.

== Demographics ==
Historical population
Census	Pop.	Note	%±
1820	1,025		—
1830	1,960		91.2%
1840	2,019		3.0%
1850	1,849		−8.4%
1860	1,698		−8.2%
1870	1,524		−10.2%
1880	1,882		23.5%
1890	2,436		29.4%
1900	2,788		14.4%
1910	2,699		−3.2%
1920	2,309		−14.4%
1930	2,299		−0.4%
1940	2,166		−5.8%
1950	2,028		−6.4%
1960	1,799		−11.3%
1970	1,742		−3.2%
1980	2,252		29.3%
1990	2,116		−6.0%
2000	2,721		28.6%
2010	2,732		0.4%
2020	3,035		11.1%
U.S. Decennial Census

As of the census of 2000, there were 2,721 people, 1,074 households, and 644 families residing in the town. The population density was 30.1 inhabitants per square mile (11.6/km^{2}). There were 2,840 housing units at an average density of 31.4 per square mile (12.1/km^{2}). The racial makeup of the town was 96.95% White, 0.59% Black or African American, 0.11% Native American, 0.15% Asian, 0.04% Pacific Islander, 0.33% from other races, and 1.84% from two or more races. Hispanic or Latino of any race were 2.09% of the population.

There were 1,074 households, out of which 26.6% had children under the age of 18 living with them, 43.8% were married couples living together, 10.1% had a female householder with no husband present, and 40.0% were non-families. 34.2% of all households were made up of individuals, and 12.5% had someone living alone who was 65 years of age or older. The average household size was 2.25 and the average family size was 2.88.

In the town, the population was spread out, with 26.2% under the age of 18, 6.0% from 18 to 24, 23.8% from 25 to 44, 27.9% from 45 to 64, and 16.2% who were 65 years of age or older. The median age was 41 years. For every 100 females, there were 102.8 males. For every 100 females age 18 and over, there were 101.8 males.

The median income for a household in the town was $33,382, and the median income for a family was $42,200. Males had a median income of $35,532 versus $22,188 for females. The per capita income for the town was $18,496. About 11.1% of families and 19.5% of the population were below the poverty line, including 24.0% of those under age 18 and 16.5% of those age 65 or over.

== Communities and locations in the town of Hunter ==
- Edgewood – a hamlet in the southern part of the town on New York State Route 214.
- Elka Park (12427) – a hamlet south of Tannersville.
- Haines Falls (ZIP Code 12436) – a hamlet east of Tannersville and west of Palenville
- Hunter (ZIP Code 12442) – village in the western part of the town on New York State Route 23A.
- Kaaterskill Falls – a location east of Haines Falls.
- Lanesville (12450) – a hamlet in the southern part of the town, south of Edgewood on Route 214.
- Onteora Park – a private park north of Tannersville
- Platte Clove (12427) – a hamlet in the eastern part of the town.
- Tannersville (12485) – a village east of Hunter village.
- Twilight Park – a private park in Haines Falls.

== Points of interest ==
- The village of Hunter has been home to a summer camp going by the name of Camp Loyaltown. Dedicated in July 1949, the camp specializes in caring for individuals with intellectual and other developmental disabilities, including autism, emotional and behavioral disorders, cerebral palsy and Down syndrome. Every year, more than 650 campers/guests come to Camp Loyaltown to enjoy the scenic locale and traditional summer camp activities. The camp attracts staff (counselors, admin personnel etc.) from all over the world, who become a major presence and contributor to the village's economy each summer.
- Camp Jened, a summer camp for disabled people with a broader range of physical and cognitive disabilities than Camp Loyaltown, was located on Ski Bowl Road in the second half of the 20th century. It was a major focal point for the disability rights movement and independent living movement.
- Hunter Mountain is the highest peak in the county and the second highest in the Catskills. The mountain is the site of the Hunter Mountain ski area which is open for skiing and tubing in the winter and biking, sightseeing, zip lining and hiking in the summer. The ski resort is the largest employer in the village, which is run by Vail Resorts in the heart of Hunter. The seasonal nature of the mountain regulates the economic activity of the town.

== Notable people ==
- Robert O. Tyler (1831–1874), U.S. Civil War general
- John Francis Hylan (1868–1936), 96th mayor of New York City
