= Stony Clove Creek =

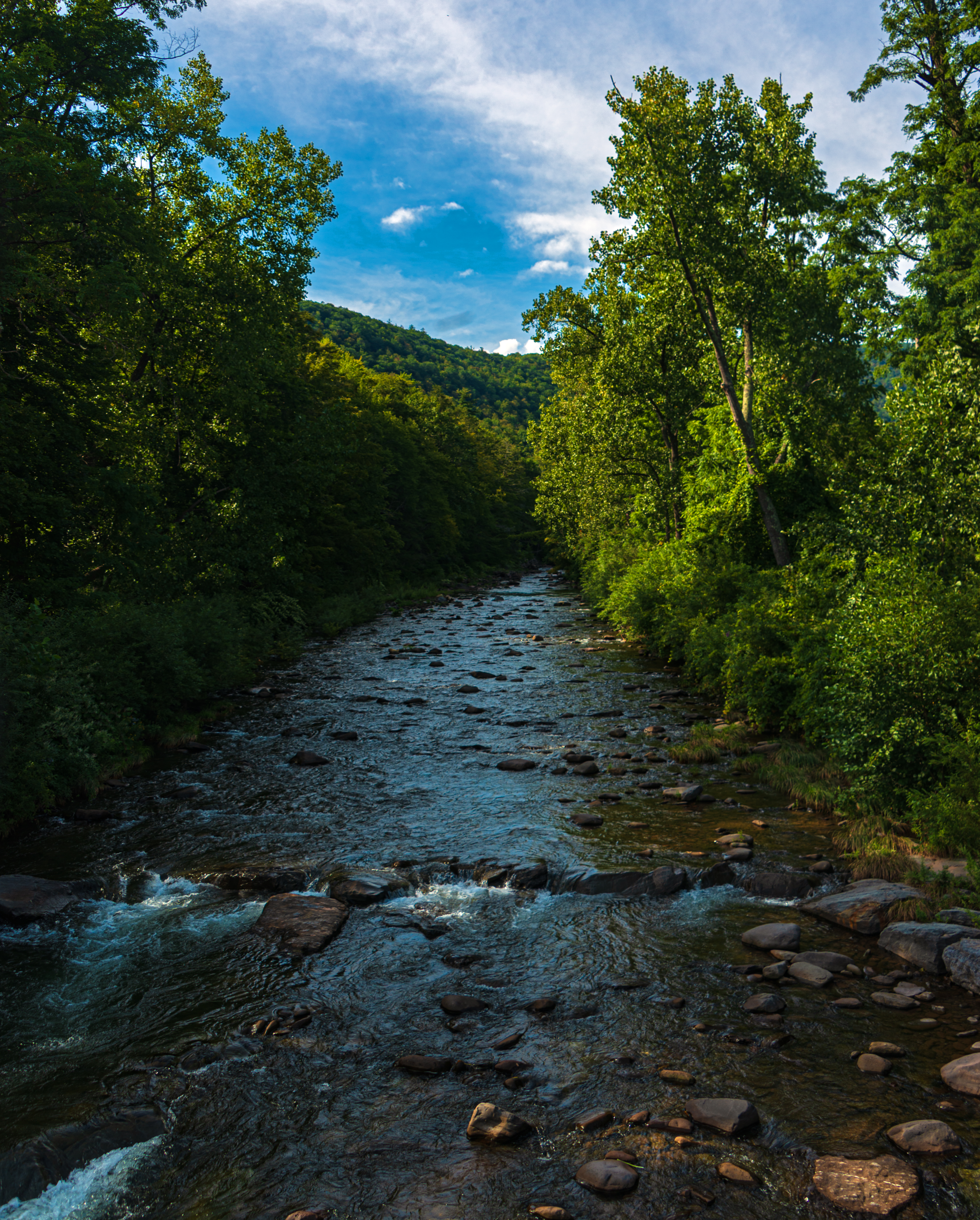
- Stony Clove Creek in Phoenicia, just above its mouth

- Location of the mouth of Stony Clove Creek Stony Clove Creek (the United States)

Location
- Country: United States
- State: New York
- Region: Catskill Mountains
- Counties: Ulster, Greene
- Towns: Hunter, Shandaken

Physical characteristics
- Source: Notch Lake
  - location: Stony Clove Notch, N of Edgewood, New York, U.S.
  - coordinates: 42°09′34″N 74°12′15″W
  - elevation: 1,980 feet (600 m)
- Mouth: Esopus Creek
  - location: Phoenicia, New York, U.S.
  - coordinates: 42°04′53″N 74°18′52″W
  - elevation: 804 ft (245 m)
- Length: 10.3 mi (16.6 km)
- Basin size: 32.4 square miles (83.9 km^{2})
- Discharge
  - location: Chichester
  - minimum: 3.1 cu ft/s (0.088 m^{3}/s)
  - maximum: 14,300 cu ft/s (400 m^{3}/s)

Basin features
- Tributaries
  - left: Warner Creek
  - right: Myrtle Brook, Hollow Tree Brook, Ox Clove Brook

Stony Clove Creek is a 10.3-mile-long (16.6 km) creek in the Catskill Mountains in New York. It is a tributary of Esopus Creek, which in turn is a tributary of the Hudson River. It joins the Esopus in the village of Phoenicia, and has two smaller tributaries north of Phoenicia.

== Description ==
The Stony Clove starts near the Stony Clove Notch in Edgewood in Greene County. It originates at Notch Lake, near the Devil's Tombstone Campsite, and flows through the small villages of Edgewood and Lanesville, entering Ulster County at Chichester.

== History ==
Early maps and deeds indicate that the Stony Clove flowed into the Warner Bushkill, or alternatively named, the Barber Bushkill, before flowing into the Esopus. Later cartographers have changed the nomenclature of the streams so that the Barber Bushkill or Warner Bushkill flows into the Stony Clove.

It was formed about 10,000 years ago, during the last Ice age. It was formed when the same meltwater that formed the Stony Clove Notch burst through, and flooded a valley. The water, in turn, started running down through an already gouged-out pass, forming a small river.

== Hydrology ==
=== Discharge ===
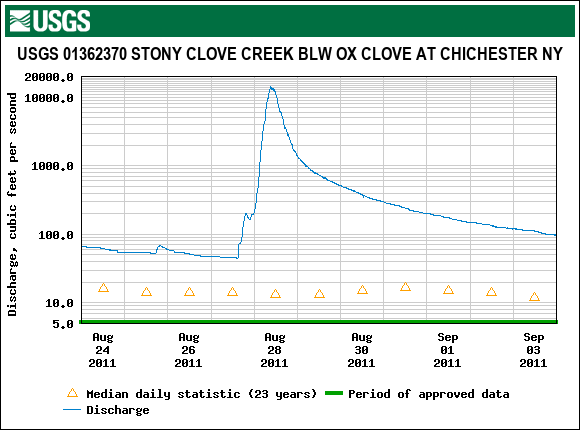
Graph from Chichester USGS stream gauge showing rise in discharge after Tropical Storm Irene

The United States Geological Survey (USGS) maintains stream gauges along Stony Clove Creek. The station in Chichester in operation since 1997, 1.8 miles (2.9 km) upstream from the Esopus, had a maximum discharge of 14,300 cubic feet (400 m^{3}) per second on August 28, 2011, as Hurricane Irene passed through the area. It had a minimum discharge of 3.1 cubic feet (0.088 m^{3}) per second on October 3, 2014. A former station in operation from February 1997 to August 2007, 1.3 miles (2.1 km) upstream from the Esopus, had a maximum discharge of 13,000 cubic feet (370 m^{3}) per second on April 2, 2005, and a minimum discharge of 3.7 cubic feet (0.10 m^{3}) per second from September 20–22, 2002.

=== Turbidity ===
Stony Clove Creek is the largest source of turbidity and suspended-sediment concentration in the upper Esopus Creek, accounting for more turbidity than the rest of the upper Esopus watershed combined.

The USGS station along the creek in Chichester collects turbidity data every 15 minutes. The maximum daily SSC mean was 2,860 mg/L on December 1, 2010, and the minimum was under 1 mg/L over many days in late August through September 2014. The maximum daily suspended sediment discharge was 8,860 tons (8,040 t) on September 18, 2012, and the lowest was less than 0.01 tons (0.0091 t) from January 15–17, 2012 and many days in September 2013.

== Tributaries ==
- Ox Clove Brook
- Warner Creek
- Hollow Tree Brook
- Lanes Hollow Brook
- Rhine Hollow Brook
- Fenwick Brook
- Lanes Hollow Brook
- Christine Brook

== See also ==
- List of rivers of New York
