= Long Path =

Hiking trail from George Washington Bridge to Mohawk River valley in upstate New York

Coordinates: 41.100472°N 74.158444°W

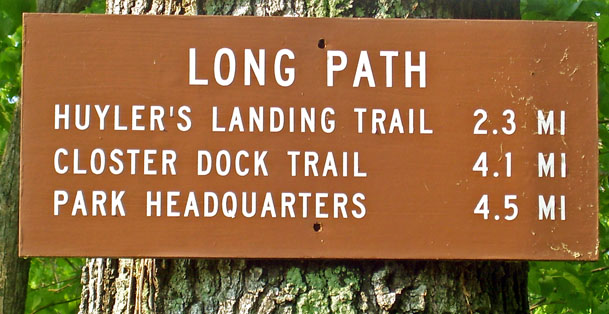
- Long Path mileage sign in Palisades Interstate Park
- Length: 357 mi (575 km)
- Location: New Jersey and New York, United States
- Designation: National Recreation Trail (parts)
- Trailheads: 175th Street subway station, New York, NY; John Boyd Thacher State Park, New York
- Use: Hiking
- Highest point: Slide Mountain
- Lowest point: Sparkill Creek
- Difficulty: Moderate to strenuous
- Sights: New Jersey Palisades, Harriman State Park, Schunemunk Mountain, Shawangunk Ridge, Catskill Mountains, Vroman's Nose

The Long Path is a 357-mile (575 km) long-distance hiking trail beginning in New York City, at the West 175th Street subway station near the George Washington Bridge and ending at Altamont, New York, in the Albany area. While not yet a continuous trail, relying on road walks in some areas, it nevertheless takes in many of the popular hiking attractions west of the Hudson River, such as the New Jersey Palisades, Harriman State Park, the Shawangunk Ridge and the Catskill Mountains. It offers hikers a diversity of environments to pass through, from suburbia and sea-level salt marshes along the Hudson to wilderness and boreal forest on Catskill summits 4,000 feet (1,220 m) in elevation.

When conceived in the 1930s, it was to be the antithesis of a hiking trail, with neither a designated route nor blazes, simply a list of points of interest hikers could find their own routes to. However, increasing development after World War II in Orange and Rockland counties made that less workable, and it was revived in the 1960s as a standard trail. Work to extend the trail into the Adirondacks is currently underway.

== History ==
=== Conception ===
Vincent Joseph Schaefer, a scientist who worked in Schenectady for General Electric, began to imagine a "hiker's route" from New York City to the Adirondacks shortly after helping to found the Mohawk Valley Hiking Club in 1929. He was very clear on one thing: that it not be marked as a trail.

"Schaefer envisioned resourceful hikers making use of what they found along the way," say historians Guy and Laura Waterman — whether hikers' trails, back roads, abandoned wood roads, tow paths, creek beds, game trails, plus occasional bushwhacks where that appeared to offer the most interesting route." They quote him describing the Long Path as:

...[A] route that a person having good "woods" sense could use to move across a region using compass and "topo" map, and that in a meandering way would lead such persons to most of the interesting scenic vistas, rock formations, choice or unique vegetation, historical sites and similar items that a certain type of outdoors person enjoys.

He wrote to an official at Harriman that:

There would be no cutting or blazing, for this trail would be a truly wild walk that wouldn't erode the land or scar the solitude ... and each found site would be an adventure in orienteering.

=== Implementation ===
He named his idea the Long Path after Walt Whitman's line about "the long brown path that leads wherever I choose" from his poem "Song of the Open Road". Since that was also where Raymond H. Torrey, the New York Post's influential hiking columnist, had gotten the name for his column, it was a smart public relations choice. Torrey, who had done much to get the Appalachian Trail built, both physically and in print, in the New York metropolitan area the previous decade, announced the idea in a column in 1933. Another strong advocate in the early days was a transplanted Coloradan, W. W. Cady, who came to be identified with the Long Path almost as much as Schaefer.

He and Torrey, who devoted a series of columns to it the next year, scouted a "trail" from the city to the Catskills, while Schaefer and his brother did the same for the northern half. Several alternative endpoints were envisioned: the "History" chapter of the Guide to the Long Path places the end at Whiteface Mountain in the Adirondack High Peaks, but Torrey's column of August 21, 1934 places the terminus at the Adirondak Loj at Lake Clear of Heart (now called Heart Lake). The column further discusses possible extensions: a route over Wallface Mountain to join the Northville-Placid Trail by way of Henderson Lake and the Preston Ponds; a climb over Mount Van Hoevenberg and traverse of the Sentinel Range Wilderness Area to emerge at Jay, New York; and possible routes to the Canadian border, either to the Thousand Islands to the west or along the Chateaugay River to the north. Curiously, Schaefer's account in Torrey's column never mentions Whiteface as a possible ending point.

To Schaefer, once this route was scouted, it was finished, per his concept ... "(it) exist(s) as soon as the route had been field explored and then marked on a topo map, and so had become available to the person who appreciates such things." However, very few of these people could be counted among the hiking community of the day, to whom a trail was something to follow, and they had difficulty grasping the concept that the trail was open. Schaefer and hiking club pal Al Getz followed the Long Path from Schenectady to Edward's Hill in the southern Adirondacks, near Bakers Mills, New York, in the late 1930s, but as Schaefer and Cady became involved in the war effort and drifted away from the hiking community, the idea of the Long Path as originally conceived quickly became part of history.

=== Resurrection ===
In 1960, Robert Jessen of the Ramapo Ramblers hiking club, and another city-based hiker, Michael Warren, revived the idea. Since Rockland and Orange counties had become more developed even then, they abandoned the original concept of an unmarked route and pushed instead a conventional trail, although it had to make use of road routes. Over the next two decades they were successful in establishing a continuous trail from the George Washington Bridge to the southern Catskills, helped by a major relocation of the trail up Peekamoose Mountain and its continuation over Peekamoose's neighbor, Table Mountain (which previously had no established trails), crossing the east branch of the Neversink River and enabling a link with the existing Catskill trail system.

The Catskill route was finally completed in 1987 when a trail was built connecting the snowmobile loop around Kaaterskill High Peak to Palenville. A further missing link, from the Sam's Point Preserve in the Shawangunks to VerKeerderkill Falls, was cut a decade later.

In 1991, Vince Schaefer prepared a guide to the Long Path north (LPN) section, consisting of a set of five sets of short descriptions of 80+ "Landmarks" with accompanying topographic map locations. The guide was crafted as a hiker's pocket-sized book, entitled Field Guide to the Landmarks of the Long Path of New York: Northern Section -- Gilboa to Whiteface Mt., prepared by Vincent J Schaefer 1931-1991 with the original route and philosophy.

Schaefer's son, James M. Schaefer, joined the Long Path North Hiking Club Trail Committee, sharing sets of letters, sketches and plans from his father's files to push the Long Path into the 21st century. With members of the club, a route was set, landmarks were located by Global Positioning System, and digital photos were established for 80-plus places that Schaefer reckoned to be worthy of attention.

On the ground, a low-volume road walk was located through Albany, Schenectady and Saratoga counties, crossing the Helderbergs and the Rotterdam Hills to the Mohawk River. The LPN connected to county and state parks whenever possible and had a goal of relocating sections "off-road". Across the Mohawk the Long Path coursed into the Glenville Hills, with a major off-road section atop Wolf Hollow.

As it reached the (southern) Adirondack Blue Line, just north of Lake Desolation, the Long Path took on a "Forever-Wild" character, becoming a bushwhack, a landmark-to-landmark trek through the southern and central park into the High Peaks, following log roads, existing trails, and low volume roads to eventually reach the top of Whiteface Mountain, with its climate observation tower — SUNY's "Schaefer Observatory" of 1980 Olympic fame — as the last cached location of the Long Path.

In summary, the Long Path has become a hybrid trail. A 70-year-old first: an ecologically sensitive "path" from high density urban centers, across the Eastern New York high country, to remote wilderness. The blazed 357 miles (575 km) of the LP are suitable for the traditional blazed-trail hiker, the 100-mile (160 km) low-volume road-walk affords the physically challenged with a way to appreciate semi-wild places accompanied by culturally, geologically and historic way-side landmarks. And for the woods savvy hiker, the bushwhacks through the last 150 miles (240 km) of the Long Path capture Vince Schaefer's original vision — a tramp across short distances using 'dead-reckoning, modern point-to-point "geocaching" and sheer map reading, orienteering skills'. 75 years after the thought, a "Long Brown Path" exists.

=== Expansion ===
As the lower trail neared completion to the northern boundary of Catskill Park at Route 23 in Windham in 1985, H. Neil Zimmerman of the New York–New Jersey Trail Conference renewed interest in the Adirondack connection. The Long Path North Hiking Club was formed, and after some negotiations with area landowners 8 miles (13 km) of trail were opened in 1990. By the middle of the decade, it would extend 75 miles (121 km) north of its former terminus, to the Indian Ladder in John Boyd Thacher State Park. In the early 2000s, a further 5 miles (8 km) were opened and blazed to Route 146, and informal road blazes existed from there to the Mohawk and the Adirondack Park Blue Line.

== Today ==

Perhaps reflecting its origins as a trail that wasn't really a trail, the Long Path in the early 21st century is a work in progress, continually evolving even in those places where it has long been a presence. Relocations continue to be made and new sections opened.

The central Catskills have seen the greatest activity. In 1999, trail crews completed work on a section starting at the Willow Trail near the summit of Mount Tremper near Phoenicia, descending down into the neighboring valley and then over "Edgewood Mountain" into Silver Hollow Notch, where it follows an old road down to Route 214. This section eliminated a lengthy road walk to Willow, albeit at the price of a 2-mile (3 km) road walk into Stony Clove Notch. However, this added Plateau Mountain to the trail route, and pending future approval from the New York State Department of Environmental Conservation and an amendment to the Unit Management Plan for the Indian Head Wilderness Area, a new section will be built to follow a ridge from Silver Hollow Notch to the Devil's Path on Plateau and eliminate that road walk.

Not long afterwards, the state purchased the former Lundy estate in the vicinity of Kerhonkson, 4,930 acres (20.0 km^{2}) straddling the Catskill Park Blue Line near the southern tip of the park. The new property, once occupied by an owner of Lundy's Restaurant, is to become a state forest outside the park and a new Wild Forest within it. It will also allow for the relocation of the Long Path off roads to follow the Vernooy Kill. The relocation would rejoin the present Long Path route at Vernooy Falls west of Riggsville in the Ulster County township of Rochester.

In late 2001, the Catskill Center for Conservation and Development allowed the construction of a new trail across its Platte Clove Preserve. It was added to the Long Path, and allowed for a rerouting of the route along existing trails to take in Indian Head Mountain and its views of the Hudson Valley, as well as eliminating a road walk that previously existed.

In 2007 the road walk on Route 214 was eliminated. Volunteers extended the Warner Creek Trail with a direct connection between Silver hollow Notch and Plateau Mountain. This created a 23-mile (37 km) section of trail between Phoenicia and Platte Clove without any road crossings.

To the south of Phoenicia, from the Burroughs Range Trail near Wittenberg Mountain, a new section of trail has been constructed for the Long Path. This route crosses Cross Mountain, Mount Pleasant and Romer Mountain. It comes out on Lane Street in Phoenicia. This section opened on Trails Day June 7, 2014. This has eliminated the more than 5-mile (8 km) road walk out of Woodland Valley State Campground.

All these changes have combined or will to make the 94 miles (151 km) of Long Path in the Catskill Park almost entirely off-road.

In the Shawangunks, new agreements with landowners and/or changes in ownership have also made eliminations of road walks possible.

Further south, in heavily suburbanized Rockland County, where some road walks are now mostly unavoidable, the county's Planning Board has made the Long Path route an area of special attention and one of its spines for open space preservation efforts, trying to convince its local counterparts to protect the corridor.

North of the Catskills, the Long Path North Committee continues its efforts to bypass road walks and route the trail into more wooded areas, particularly the small state forests in Schoharie County. The main problem the trail faces there, ironically, is under-use. Some sections just north of the Catskill Park are getting overgrown and only the blazes remain to indicate the trail. Increasing public awareness of the trail and promoting use of various sections continues to be a concern.

Lastly, in 2015 the southern end of the trail was moved to New York City, to the 175th Street subway station in the Washington Heights section of Manhattan.

=== The Orange County problem ===
From the earliest days of the Long Path one of the most difficult issues has been how to get the trail across northern Orange County as a footpath. Between Schunemunk Mountain and the Shawangunks lies the broad valley of the Wallkill River and the many lowlands within, then heavily farmed and now heavily developed.

Major progress has been made in Orange County. In 2012 almost half of the 35 miles (56 km) of road walking in Orange County were eliminated by relocating the Long Path onto the Heritage Trail, an Orange County rail-trail. Leaving the rail trail in New Hampton, the trail follows rural roads to the Shawangunk Ridge in Greenville. The online guide suggests that it might be a pleasant route for bicycling.

There is hope for moving more of the trail off the roads of western Orange County. South of I-84 still needs to be explored as farms, town parks, conservation easements and even an abandoned rail bed are all possibly available. North of I-84 also needs to be explored as it contains farms, conservation easements and watershed land for both Orange County and the city of Middletown.

=== The Shawangunk Ridge Trail ===
One way of solving the Orange County problem, avoiding it entirely, came out the joint efforts of the New York–New Jersey Trail Conference and the National Park Service. In 1989, they conducted a feasibility study on the idea of abandoning northern Orange County altogether and simply having the trail follow the Appalachian Trail from the junction in Harriman to High Point State Park in northwestern New Jersey, where a new trail would then be constructed to link up with the current LP along the ridge near Wurtsboro. The result was the Shawangunk Ridge Trail, a 71-mile (114 km) connector which drew on a possible AT relocation that had first been considered in 1965, before the National Scenic Trails Act made it possible to protect the existing route.

The SRT starts at the Appalachian Trail in High Point State Park in New Jersey. The Long Path meets up with the SRT after 11.25 miles (18.11 km), and the two trails run together for the next 34 miles (55 km). At times it hugs the base of the ridge in some areas due to land-access issues, and has some road walks, but these are slowly being eliminated. The low-lying route in Sullivan County actually is something of a blessing, as it allows hikers to take in the magnificent Basha Kill Wildlife Management Area.

The AT-SRT detour is the route currently recommended by the Trail Conference for anyone considering a thru-hike of the LP, due to its better capacity for camping and fewer road walks, despite the additional 22 miles (35 km) it adds to the trip. However, if doing the Long Path as individual day hikes, it is best to remain on the main trail. Taking the AT one misses the entire north end of Harriman State Park, Schunemunk Mountain and the Heritage Trail.

== Management ==
The Long Path is under the purview of the Trail Conference, which divides it geographically into three sections:

- The Long Path South Committee for the areas south of the Catskills
- the existing Catskill Trails Committee for the Catskills
- and The Long Path North Committee.

As the areas under the jurisdiction of the latter are somewhat beyond the Trail Conference's usual reach in the Greater New York area, the Long Path North Committee functions somewhat independently. In the future, when the trail begins to extend into the Adirondacks, it is likely that the Adirondack Mountain Club or some other group based in the region will have management responsibilities for those sections.

== Marking ==
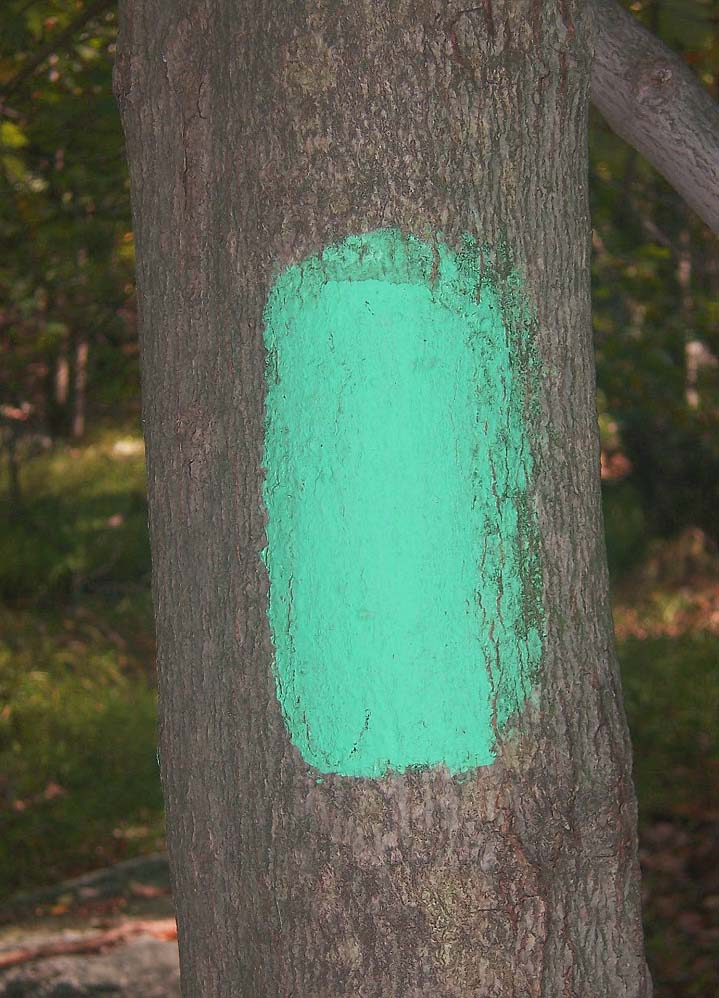
A typical Long Path paint blaze in aqua, here in the Shawangunks

Throughout most of its length, whether on or off the road, the Long Path is indicated by a 2-by-4-inch (5 by 10 cm) aqua blaze. In some areas where blazes have not been repainted in some time, older light blue blazes may be found, but the distinctive aqua (sometimes referred to, incorrectly, in some guidebooks as teal) indicates the Long Path, and only the Long Path.

In the Catskills and the state forests on the Shawangunk Ridge, the trail uses official NYSDEC markers — blue in the Shawangunks, and whatever color is used for the particular trail in the Catskills the LP follows. Markers with the Long Path logo (see above), either in aqua or blue (if older), can sometimes be found on signage at junctions where the LP changes trails.

The mile-long trail through the Catskill Center's Platte Clove Preserve follows green diamond-shaped metal markers with the Center's logo on it.

Finally, the section in Thacher State Park follows aqua plastic markers with the LP logo.

The Shawangunk Ridge Trail uses either the aqua blazes or blue NYSDEC markers, depending on whether it is on public or private land.

== End-to-end ==
When it began to be established as a marked trail, the Long Path was not built with an eye toward being "thru-hiked" in one continuous trip, as it was more a backbone for creating hiking opportunities in areas which did not yet have them and thus ideal for day trips or short overnights. The Trail Conference did give out rockers for those who completed a tally sheet of trips made on different dates. The trail, even with the AT/Shawangunk Ridge detour available, was difficult for those from out of the region who would need access to maildrops and places to sleep in the areas where camping is not permitted.

After several dozen hikers had earned these, it was perhaps inevitable that someone would be the Earl Shaffer of the Long Path, and on May 30, 1998, Mary Ann Nissley of Chalfont, Pennsylvania, a woman with experience hiking many long-distance trails, completed the first Long Path thru-hike in 25 days. Several others have followed since.

The Long Path Guide

The current Long Path guidebook now has information on nearby post offices, motels and other things useful for those contemplating a thru-hike.

On May 24, 2005, trail runner David O'Neill, the founder of Charity Runners Inc., finished the first thru-run of the Long Path, as a benefit for the Trail Conference. He had started on the first of the month; his time of 24 days is the current record for fastest journey up the Long Path. (This included five days where he rested and allowed injuries to heal, and one day he did as a normal hike.)

On May 13, 2006, O'Neill repeated the benefit thru-run and became the first to complete a thru-run of the Long Path using the AT-SRT detour. He started on the first of the month and completed the 369-mile (594 km) journey in 12 days, 5 hours, and 17 minutes.

In 2009, Jacob Aronson fulfilled Vincent Schaefer's original concept of hiking from the George Washington Bridge to Schaefer Observatory atop Whiteface Mountain in the Adirondacks. He arrived in Altamont, New York, on July 6 to complete his thru-hike of the Long Path in 27 days. Using a combination of road walks and the Northville-Placid Trail, he made his way from Altamont to Lake Placid, where he climbed nearby Whiteface Mountain on July 25, 46 days after he began hiking.

On July 26, 2013 Daniel J. Rosenthal of Sunderland, Vermont, became the first person to complete a southbound thru-hike on the trail.

On September 3, 2013, Kenneth Posner of New York City completed a through-run using the Long Path's 2012 re-route on the Schunemunk Ridge in Orange County, along the Orange Heritage Trail, and to the Shawangunk Ridge Trail in Greenville. His run was mostly self-supported (for the first 300 miles (480 km)); he put food/supply caches at six points along the route, and slept on the ground (on a sleep mat) at places along the trailside. It took him nine days to complete the entire trail, the current record.

In 2024, Shaun Gitlin of Sheepshead Bay, Brooklyn, became the first person to thru-hike the Long Path during the winter season.

== Route ==
=== Fort Lee to Harriman State Park ===
Currently, from its new beginning just slightly south of the old one, the LP goes over the bridge approach and then a pedestrian bridge over a ramp from the bridge to the Palisades Interstate Parkway. After that, it enters the park along the cliff edges that it will remain in for the next 12.7 miles (20.4 km) to the state line, running through the woods next to Palisades Parkway at times and even passing through some of its rest stops and parking areas.

Once past the stone monument at the state line, it briefly dips back into New Jersey, then moves closer to U.S. Route 9W near Columbia University's Lamont–Doherty Earth Observatory, then heading for Tallman Mountain State Park, where it climbs the eponymous feature, then descends to the trail's lowest elevation, a mere 5 feet (1.5 m) above sea level as it crosses Sparkill Creek on a wooden bridge.

Climbing and crossing Route 9W again, it passes through the low hills in and near two county parks as it climbs up toward Blauvelt State Park, then drops into Nyack, where it crosses the New York State Thruway for the first time. After passing through Mountainview County Nature Park, it follows 9W for a mile or so, then leaves it for Hook Mountain State Park and its dramatic views over the Hudson's Haverstraw Bay. It then drops down to the small Haverstraw Beach State Park and follows a road out of it into High Tor State Park, where the bare summit of the tor, the highest peak of the Palisades at 832 feet (254 m), affords the best views of this section of the Hudson Valley.

After High Tor, it stays on the ridge of South Mountain County Park as it curves away from the river, toward a crossing of the Palisades Parkway, US 202 and NY 45 in Mount Ivy. Again, the trail follows along in the woods along the parkway's right of way until it can enter Cheesecote Town Park. After that, it's a short road walk that finally allows the trail to enter Harriman State Park.

=== Harriman to the Shawangunks ===
The trail meanders through this southern part of the park, briefly joining with the cross-park Suffern-Bear Mountain Trail, passing St.-John's-in-the-Wilderness Church, and finally reaching Seven Lakes Drive at Lake Skannatati. North of there, it briefly joins the Dunning Trail and wanders among the ruins of an abandoned iron mine and joins the Arden-Surebridge Trail at the junction colloquially called "Times Square". Leaving it to run alongside Dismal Swamp, it crosses the Appalachian Trail not long afterwards, then continues north towards the Lake Cohasset Shelter where camping is permitted. It then runs along the crest of Stockbridge Mountain, passing the Stockbridge and Stockbridge Cave Shelters, and afterwards works its way down to US 6 by way of a fire road.

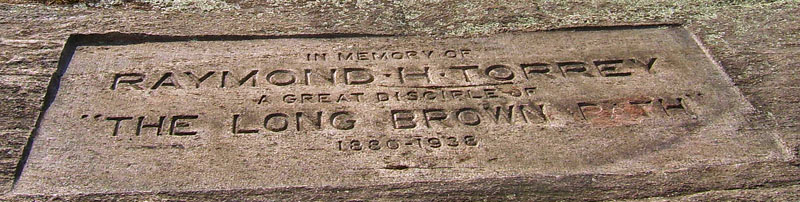
Torrey Memorial on Long Mountain

It follows an access road into a parking area, then climbs up Long Mountain to a memorial in honor of and at a favorite view of Raymond H. Torrey, who did much to make the trail possible. Then it heads westward, skirting at times the boundary of the United States Military Academy (West Point) property, crossing NY 293 and following it and later Route 6 closely in neighboring woods until it can finally leave Harriman Park behind and drop down to local roads in the Central Valley area, cross the Thruway again, then along Woodbury Creek on a dirt road to NY 32 and Schunemunk Mountain.

On Schunemunk, it ascends some subsidiary knobs with sweeping views of the whole area, and then follows the Jessup Trail southwest, where it passes commanding view across the Moodna and Wallkill valleys, and then drops off to Gonzaga Park, which bring it past the Orange and Rockland Lakes, then across Route 17 to the Heritage Trail. Following this rail trail, it passes many nice wetlands, the Black Dirt Farms in Chester, and through the historic village of Goshen. Leaving the rail trail it follows local back roads over the Wallkill River and into the town of Wawayanda. Crossing I-84 the road walk reaches Mountain Road in Greenville and ends at the Shawangunk Ridge. Cross the ridge on a recently preserved parcel joining the Shawangunk Ridge Trail.

=== Shawangunks and southern Catskills ===
The trail stays on the west side of the ridgeline, following an abandoned rail bed that once crossed the mountain. Leaving the rail bed at Route 211, the trail passes through a state forest parcel and crosses into Sullivan County where it passes through the Bashakill Wildlife Management Area. The trail reaches the village of Wurtsboro, then climbs back up to the ridgecrest and mostly follows it, as it works its way into Ulster County. The trail briefly follows an old dirt turnpike which runs parallel to and below NY 52 as it descends toward South Gully, then climbs up to Sam's Point through the South Gully, following South Gully Brook at times.

After following some of the old dirt roads from the days when the nearby ice caves were a tourist attraction, the trail follows a path through the dwarf pine forest to VerKeerderkill Falls. This section has been identified as their favorite by many who have hiked much or all of the Long Path, as the shortness of the trees gives a feeling of being above tree line and allows for constant views of the ridge ahead and behind, the Mid-Hudson valley to one side and the Catskills to the other. The falls themselves are a unique sight. After the falls the trail crosses High Point and Smiley Carriageway, then descends through Mine Hole to Berme Road.

After crossing Berme Road, the trail follows the D & H Canal towpath, to the hamlet of Port Ben. It then crosses Rondout Creek and US 209, following little-traveled local roads from there to the Catskill Park Blue Line. Shortly after entering the Catskills, it reaches the Vernooy Kill Falls, another popular day trip. It then climbs over Bangle Hill in the Sundown Wild Forest and descends steeply to an undeveloped state campground at Bull Run. A reroute through the Vernooy Kill State Forest, originally planned to open in 2016, will significantly reduce the road walk through this area. As of February 2020, the new route has not yet been completed.

One of the most challenging sections of the Long Path is ahead as it meets its first two Catskill High Peaks, climbing more than 2,600 feet (790 m) in 4 miles (6 km) to the summit of Peekamoose Mountain, then cresting neighboring Table Mountain after a brief dip.

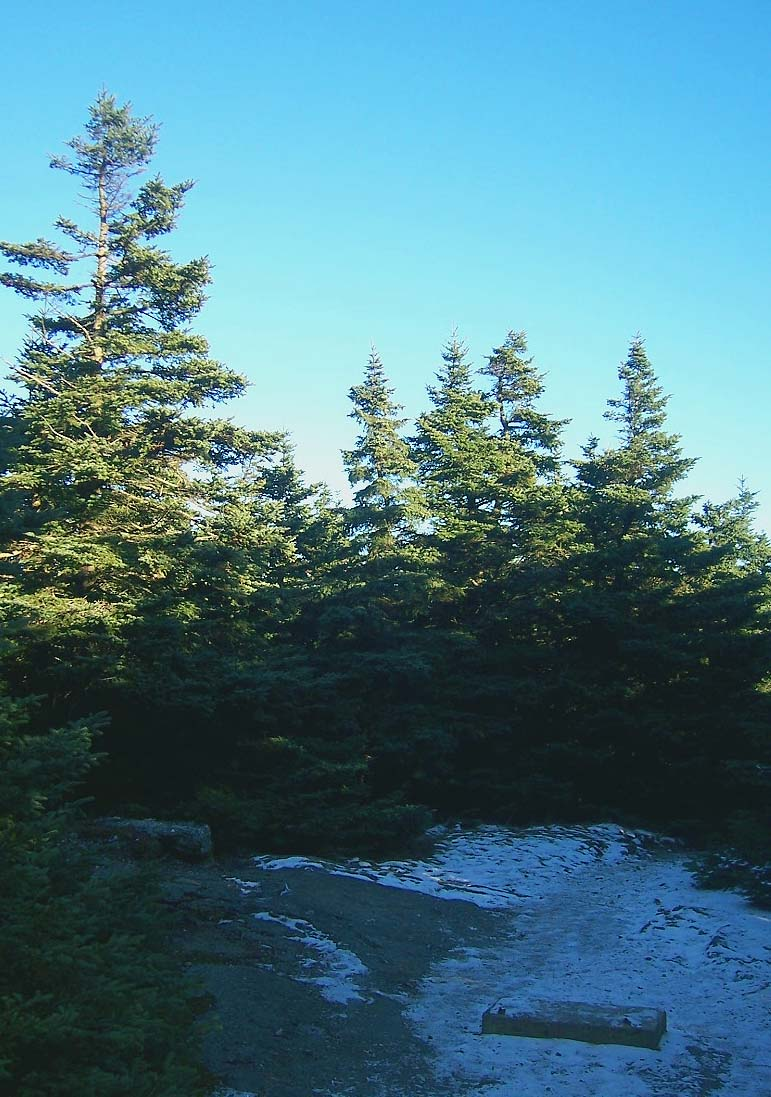
Summit of Slide Mountain, highest point on the Long Path

From there it drops down to cross the East Branch of the Neversink River and then back up again slightly to a junction with the Phoenicia-East Branch Trail and the east end of the Finger Lakes Trail. It follows the Phoenicia-East Branch Trail up to a col to the east of Wildcat Mountain, then up the beautiful Curtis-Ormsbee Trail to the summit ridge of Slide Mountain, where the Burroughs Range Trail takes it a short distance to the highest peak in the Catskills and the highest point on the LP, approximately 4,180 feet (1,270 m) above sea level.

It makes a rough descent over Cornell and Wittenberg mountains down to Cross Mountain, crosses the ridge-line of Cross Mountain, then passes just below the summit of Mount Pleasant and across Romer Mountain, then follows the road out to Phoenicia.

=== Central and northern Catskills ===
Crossing NY 28 and going through Phoenicia, an oasis of civilization amid the mountains, the Long Path follows a road east out of town to the trailhead for Mount Tremper, where it follows the old road up to the fire tower, which offers splendid views of the entire region. Continuing on down to Warners Creek and then up Edgewood Mountain, where views north have been cut, it drops down again via Silver Hollow Notch to ascend Daley Ridge, joining the Devil's Path, perhaps the most challenging and rewarding trail in the Catskills, west of the summit of Plateau. It follows the Devil's Path across Plateau, Sugarloaf, Twin and Indian Head mountains down to the Platte Clove Preserve, then makes a brief road walk to the Kaaterskill High Peak snowmobile trail. On the north side of that peak, the Long Path descends more than 2,000 feet (610 m) via a zigzag route past several waterfalls to Palenville, crosses NY 23A, then goes back up the other side of Kaaterskill Clove via the Old Overlook Road to the Escarpment Trail, the site of the legendary Catskill Mountain House, North–South Lake State Campground, and finally up to North Mountain with its inspiring views back over the Escarpment and the lakes.

Eventually the trail tops out on 3,420-foot (1,040 m) Stoppel Point near an old wrecked plane, then drops down into Dutcher Notch and then back up to a ridge culminating in a steep ascent up Blackhead Mountain and its 3,940-foot (1,200 m) summit, then down again to Acra Point, Burnt Knob and finally Windham High Peak, the northernmost of the Catskill High Peaks. Descending leisurely to NY 23, it leaves the Catskill Park but not the Catskills, as it immediately goes over several ranges of 3,000-foot (910 m) peaks to Ashland Pinnacle. A side trail, a former route of the Long Path, continues to Huntersfield Mountain, where NYSDEC has cut some views near the summit.

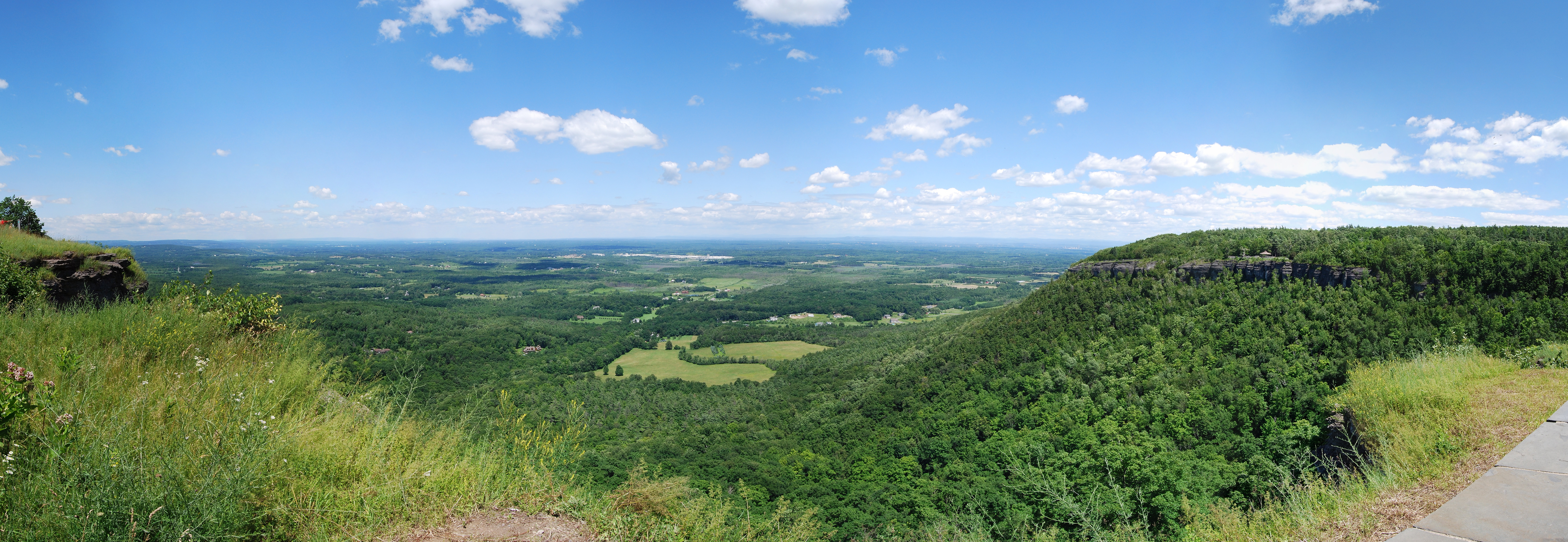
View of Albany area from Thacher Park

=== The Long Path North ===
From Ashland Pinnacle, the trail makes its way via a combination of roads, woodlots and field edges to Schoharie Reservoir, crosses the Schoharie Creek and enters the county of the same name. First stop is Mine Kill State Park and its waterfall, then the trail crosses through the woods to Lansing Manor at the Blenheim-Gilboa Power Project. continues via Burnt-Rossman Hills, Mallet Pond and Patria state forests on the other side, then up NY 30 to Vroman's Nose, a popular local hike.

Afterwards, it recrosses the Schoharie into the village of Middleburgh and follows NY 145 briefly to climb the Middleburgh cliffs, then makes its way across Cotton Hill and Dutch Settlement state forests to Albany County, where it takes in the Partridge Run Wildlife Management Area, Cole Hill State Forest, and the Helderberg Escarpment, which it follows north through John Boyd Thacher State Park, with its Indian Ladder. Currently Thacher State Park is the end of the trail for end-to-enders, but a partially off-road route has been blazed across the Mohawk River at Lock 9 park to the Saratoga County line, and from there a road walk is described to the Northville-Placid Trail within the Adirondack Park.

== See also ==
- Appalachian Trail
- Long Trail
