= Devil's Path =

Devil's Path may refer to:

- Devil's Path (Catskills), a mountain range in the Catskill Mountains of New York
  - Devil's Path (hiking trail), a hiking trail over the above range
- Devil's Path (EP) or the title song, by Dimmu Borgir, 1996
- The Devil's Path, a 2013 Japanese film directed by Kazuya Shiraishi
