= Plateau Mountain (New York) =

High Peak of New York's Catskill Mountains with two-mile (3.2 km) summit ridge

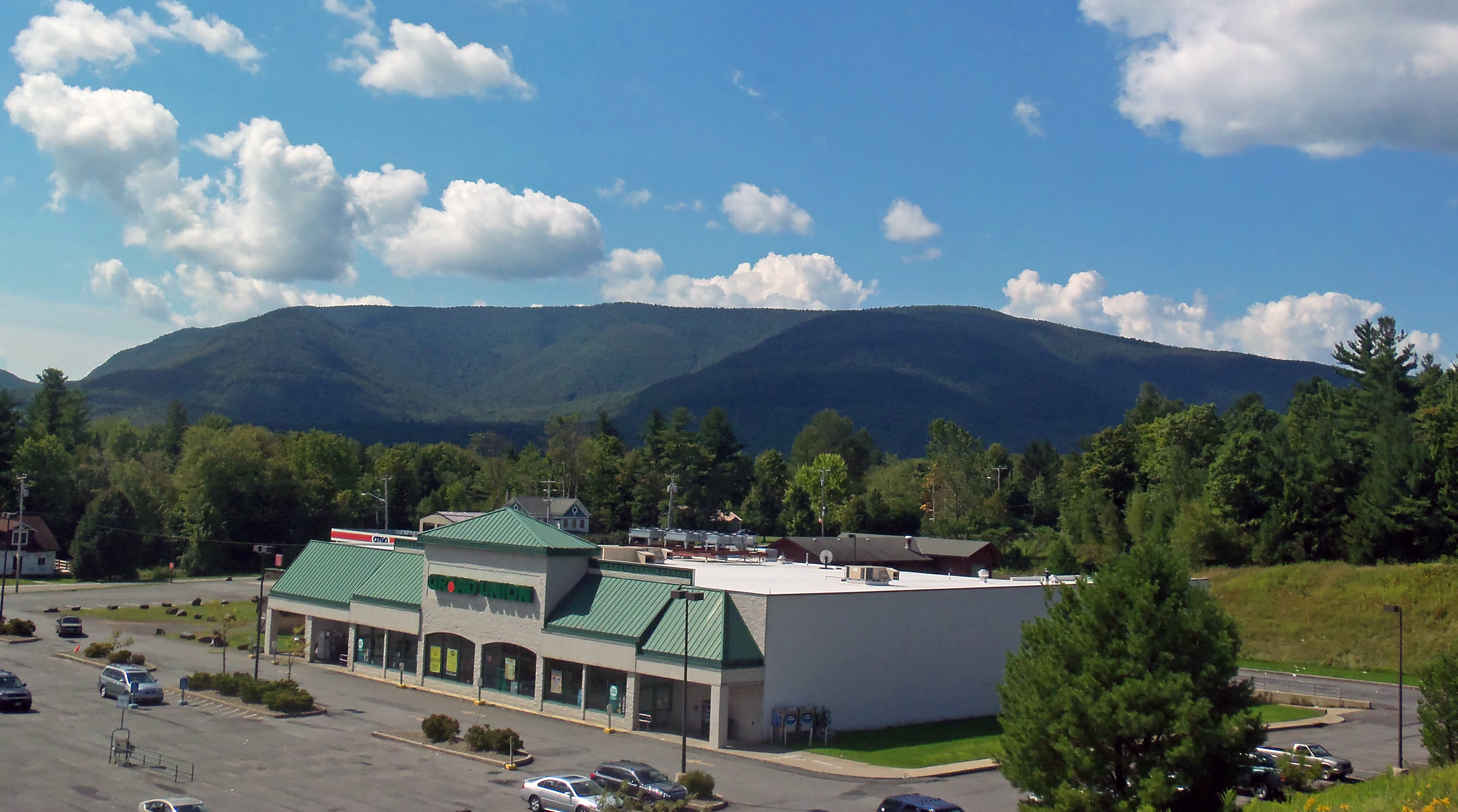
- Plateau from northeast

Highest point
- Elevation: 3840+ feet (1170+ m)
- Prominence: 1,760 ft (540 m)
- Parent peak: Hunter Mountain
- Listing: Catskill High Peaks 12th
- Coordinates: 42°08′16″N 074°10′28″W

Geography
- Location within New York
- Location: Catskill Park, Greene County, New York, U.S.
- Parent range: Devil's Path, Catskill Mountains
- Topo map: USGS Hunter

Climbing
- Easiest route: Hike via Devil's Path trail

Plateau Mountain is located in the town of Hunter in Greene County, New York, United States. It is part of the Devil's Path range of the Catskill Mountains. Plateau has a two-mile-long (3.2 km) summit ridge above 3,500 feet (1,100 m). The highest point, at least 3,840 feet (1,170 m), is at the southeast end, facing Sugarloaf Mountain to the east across Mink Hollow Notch. It is the 12th-highest peak in the range Devils Tombstone is located west of Plateau Mountain. The northwest end faces Hunter Mountain to the west across 1,400-foot-deep (430 m) Stony Clove Notch.

Plateau Mountain stands within the watershed of the Hudson River, which drains into New York Bay. It feeds the Hudson by way of Esopus Creek through Stony Clove Creek from its western slopes, and through Beaver Kill from its southeast end. Its southwest slopes drain into Warner Creek, thence into Stony Clove Creek. The northeastern slopes of Plateau drain into Schoharie Creek, thence into the Mohawk River, and the Hudson River.

Plateau Mountain is within New York's Catskill State Park. The Devil's Path hiking trail traverses the summit ridge of Plateau. A section of the Long Path, a 350-mile (560 km) long-distance hiking trail through southeastern New York, climbs up the ridge from Silver Hollow Notch to the Devil's Path midway along the ridge. The Long Path then follows the Devil's Path east to the slopes of Indian Head Mountain on the Catskill Escarpment.

== See also ==
- List of mountains in New York
