= Old Mill Falls =

- Location within New York Adirondack Park Location within the United States
- Coordinates: 42°07′59″N 74°05′10″W
- Total height: 16 ft (4.9 m)
- Watercourse: Plattekill Creek

Old Mill Falls is a waterfall located in the Catskill Mountains of New York. It is within Platte Clove and the first falls on the Plattekill Creek.
