= Twin Mountain (Greene County, New York) =

Mountain in New York, United States of America

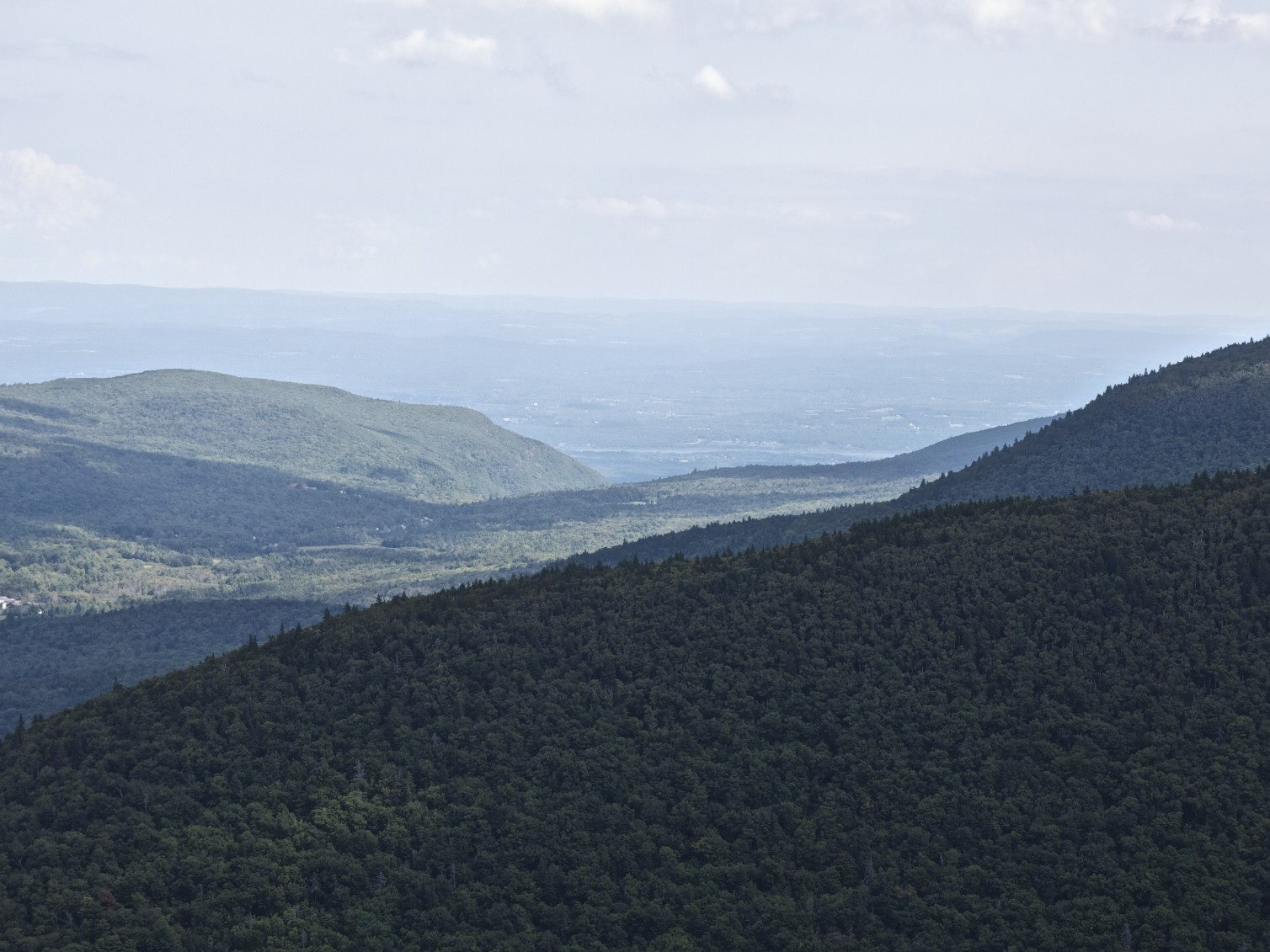
- View from North Summit of Twin Mountain

Highest point
- Elevation: 3,650 feet (1,110 m)
- Prominence: 840 ft (260 m)
- Listing: Catskill High Peaks 23rd
- Coordinates: 42°7.54′N 74°7.76′W

Geography
- Location within New York Location within the United States
- Location: Greene County, New York
- Parent range: Devil's Path
- Topo map: USGS Hunter

Twin Mountain is a mountain located in Greene County, New York. Twin gets its name from its two summits; the lower, 3,590-ft (1,090 m) peak is about .5 miles (0.8 km) to the southeast of the higher. The mountain is part of the Devil's Path range of the Catskill Mountains. To the northwest, Twin Mtn. is separated from Sugarloaf Mountain by Pecoy Notch; to the southeast, Twin Mtn. is separated from Indian Head Mountain by Jimmy Dolan Notch.

Twin Mountain stands within the watershed of the Hudson River, which drains into New York Bay. The northwest end and northeast side of Twin Mtn. drain into the headwaters of Schoharie Creek, thence into the Mohawk River, and the Hudson River. The southeast end of Twin Mtn. drains into Saw Kill, thence into Esopus Creek, and the Hudson River. The southwest side of Twin drains into Beaver Kill, thence into Esopus Creek.

Twin Mountain is contained within New York's Catskill State Park. The Devil's Path hiking trail traverses the summit ridge of Twin. The Long Path, a 350-mile (560 km) long-distance hiking trail through southeastern New York, is contiguous with this stretch of the Devil's Path.

== See also ==
- List of mountains in New York
