= Bridal Veil Falls (Plattekill Creek) =

- Location within New York Adirondack Park Location within the United States
- Coordinates: 42°07′53″N 74°05′03″W
- Watercourse: Plattekill Creek

Bridal Veil Falls is a waterfall located in the Catskill Mountains of New York. It is within Platte Clove and the third falls on the Plattekill Creek.
