= Indian Head Mountain (New York) =

Mountain in the United States

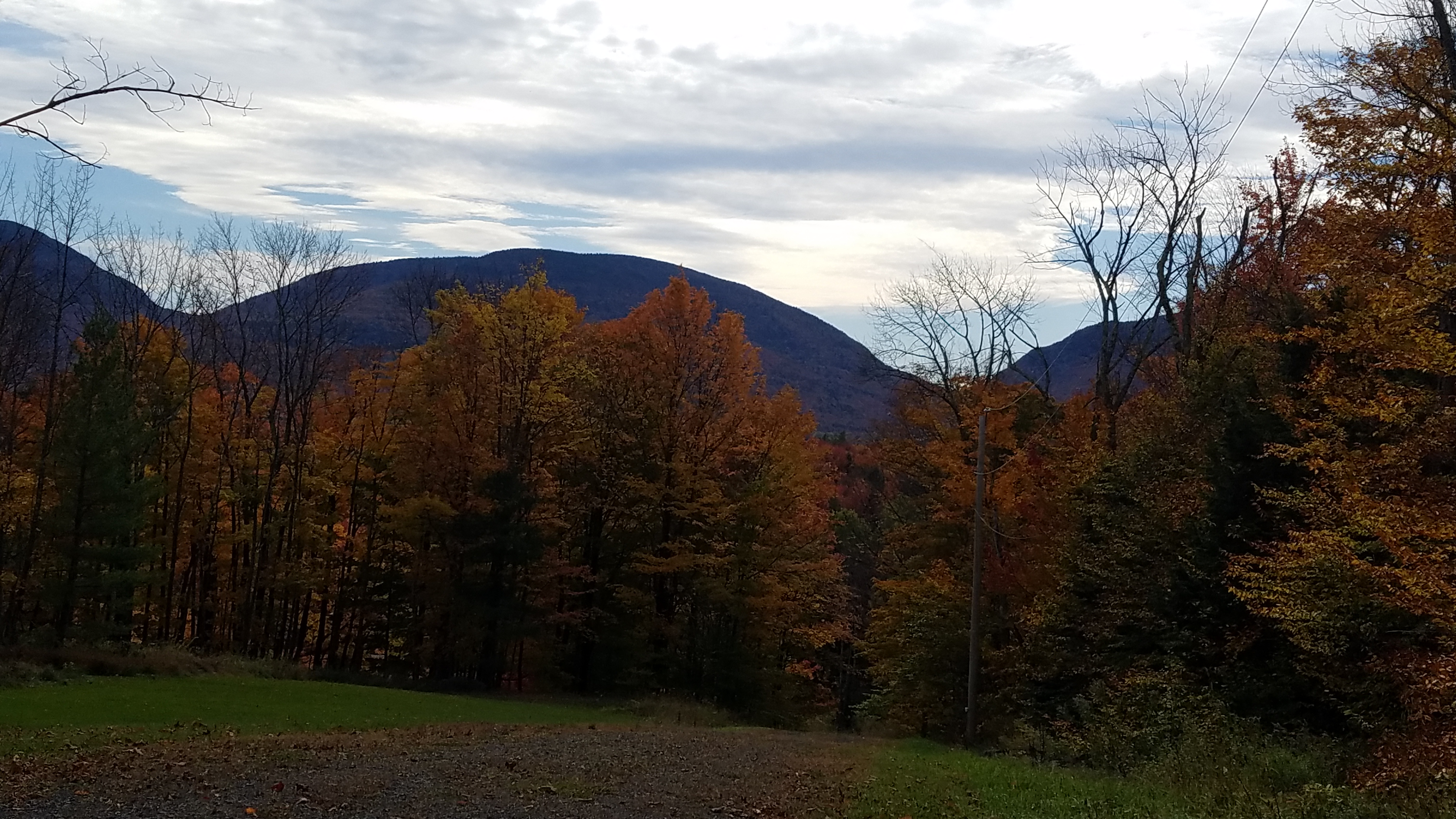
- The north face of the mountain seen from a distance

Highest point
- Elevation: 3,573 ft (1,089 m)
- Prominence: 453 ft (138 m)
- Listing: Catskill High Peaks 30th
- Coordinates: 42°06′58″N 74°06′53″W

Geography
- Location within New York Location within the United States
- Location: Greene County, New York
- Parent range: Devil's Path
- Topo map: USGS Woodstock

Indian Head Mountain is a 3,573 ft (1,089 m) mountain located in the southeast corner of Greene County, New York. The mountain, named for the appearance of its profile, is part of the Devil's Path range of the Catskill Mountains. To the northwest, Indian Head is separated from Twin Mountain by Jimmy Dolan Notch; to the southeast, Indian Head is flanked by Plattekill Mountain.

Indian Head Mountain stands within the watershed of the Hudson River, which drains into New York Bay. The north side of Indian Head drains into the headwaters of Schoharie Creek, thence into the Mohawk River, and the Hudson River. The southwest and south sides of Indian Head drain into Saw Kill, thence into Esopus Creek, and the Hudson River. The east end of Indian Head is drained by Plattekill Creek in Plattekill Clove, which runs down the Catskill Escarpment, and into Esopus Creek just above Glenerie Falls.

Indian Head Mountain is contained within New York's Catskill State Park. The mountain is the easternmost summit on the Devil's Path hiking trail. The Long Path, a 350-mile (560 km) long-distance hiking trail through southeastern New York, is contiguous with this stretch of the Devil's Path.

== See also ==
- List of mountains in New York
