= Gray Rock Falls =

- Location within New York Adirondack Park Location within the United States
- Coordinates: 42°07′37″N 74°04′32″W
- Watercourse: Plattekill Creek

Gray Rock Falls is a waterfall located in the Catskill Mountains of New York, United States. It is within Platte Clove and located just above the mouth of Black Chasm.
