= Plattekill Falls =

Waterfall

- Location within New York Adirondack Park Location within the United States
- Coordinates: 42°07′57″N 74°05′07″W
- Elevation: 1,802 ft (549 m)
- Watercourse: Plattekill Creek

Plattekill Falls is a waterfall located in the Catskill Mountains of New York. It is within Platte Clove on the Plattekill Creek.
