= Mount Marion, New York =

- Hamlet
- Location within New York Location within the United States
- Coordinates: 42°02′19″N 73°59′11″W
- Country: United States
- State: New York
- County: Ulster
- Town: Saugerties
- Elevation: 174 ft (53 m)
- Time zone: UTC-5 (Eastern (EST))
  - Summer (DST): UTC-4 (EDT)
- ZIP code: 12456
- Area code: 845
- GNIS feature ID: 957855

Mount Marion is a hamlet in the Town of Saugerties, Ulster County, New York, United States. The community is 3.2 miles (5.1 km) south-southwest of the village of Saugerties. It is also 6.8 miles (10.9 km) east of the town of Woodstock. Plattekill Creek runs through Mount Marion before joining Esopus Creek. Mount Marion has a post office with ZIP code 12456.
