= Devils Tombstone =

Mountain in New York, United States

- Location within New York Adirondack Park Location within the United States

Highest point
- Elevation: 1,959 feet (597 m)
- Coordinates: 42°09′18″N 74°12′19″W

Geography
- Location: NNE of Edgewood, New York, U.S.
- Topo map: USGS Hunter

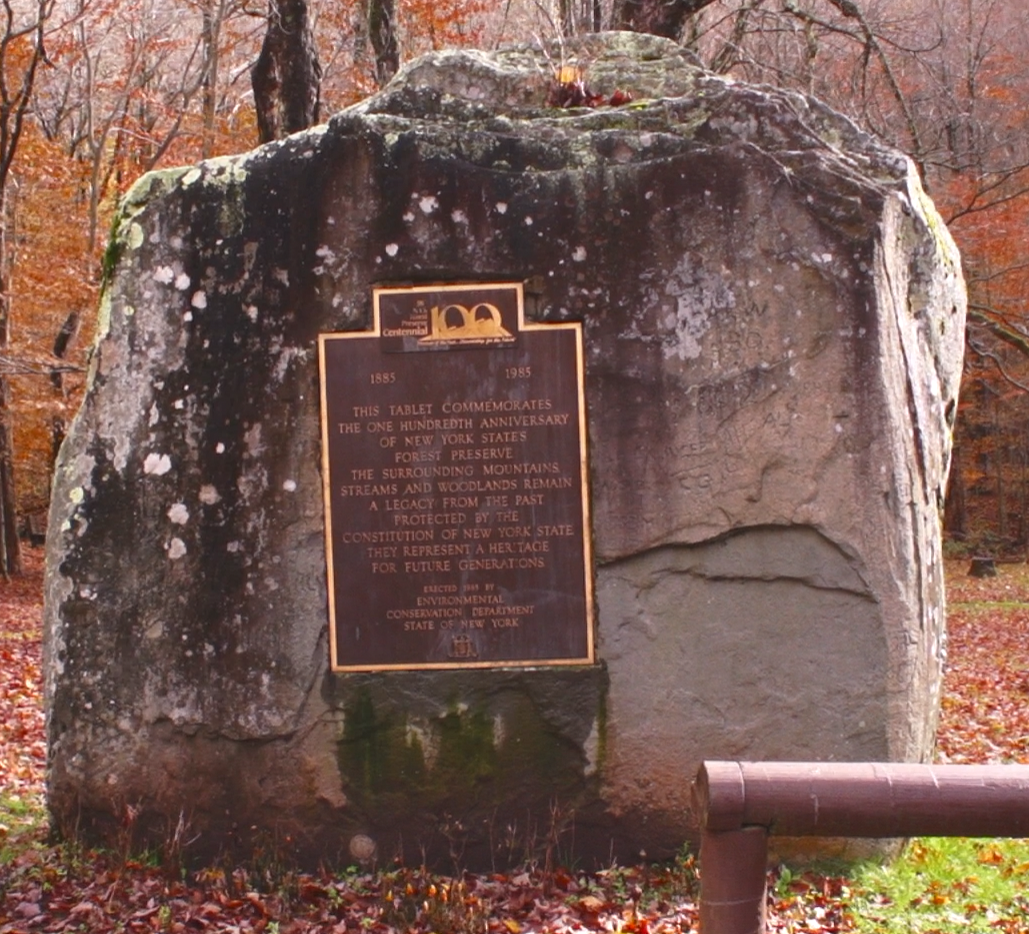
This is the Devil's Tombstone which is from where the park derives its name.

Devils Tombstone or the Devil's Tombstone Park, is a park which is named for the large rock which lay at the center of the park, which is located in Greene County, New York. The park is part of the Catskill Mountain range, and located north-northeast of Edgewood. Plateau Mountain, is located east of Devils Tombstone, Sugarloaf Mountain, is located southeast, and Hunter Mountain is directly west.

The Devil's Tombstone is one of the oldest parks in the Catskill Forest Preserve.

== Origin of the Name ==
The Devil's Tombstone park is named after a large boulder which was left behind during the Wisconsin glaciation. The rocks resemblance to an old bluestone tombstone lead to its being hoisted into a standing position.
