= Schalks Falls =

- Location within New York Adirondack Park Location within the United States
- Location: West Saugerties
- Coordinates: 42°06′46″N 74°02′57″W
- Watercourse: Plattekill Creek

Schalks Falls is a waterfall located in the Catskill Mountains of New York. It is located in the hamlet of West Saugerties.
