= Plattekill Mountain (Greene County, New York) =

Mountain in New York, United States

- Location within New York Adirondack Park Location within the United States

Highest point
- Elevation: 3,091 feet (942 m)
- Coordinates: 42°06′26″N 74°05′12″W

Geography
- Location: S of Platte Clove, New York, U.S.
- Topo map: USGS Woodstock

Plattekill Mountain is a mountain in Greene County, New York. It is located in the Catskill Mountains south of Platte Clove. Indian Head Mountain is located west-northwest of Plattekill Mountain.
