= Sugarloaf Mountain (Greene County, New York) =

Mountain located in Greene County, New York

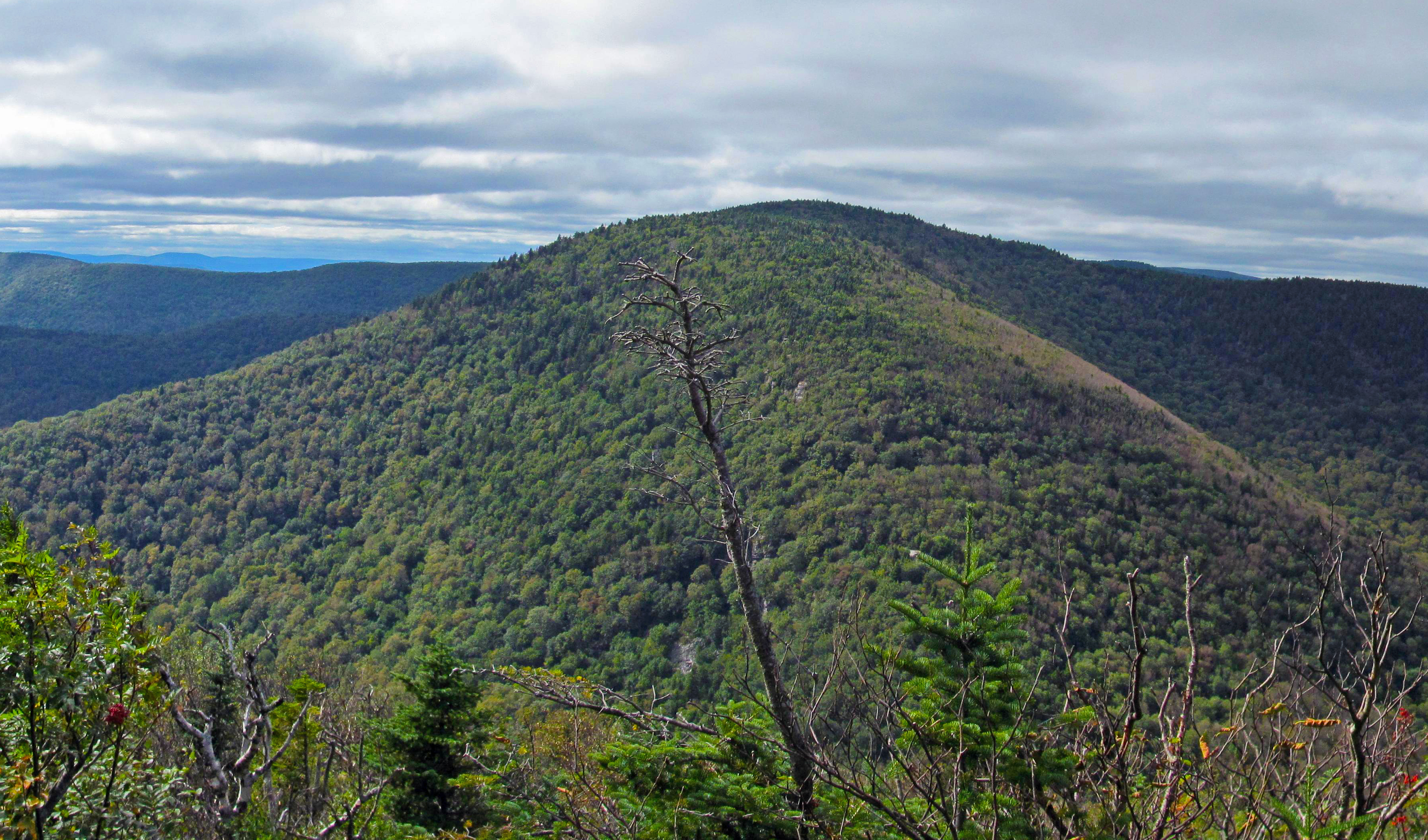
- Sugarloaf from the summit of Twin Mountain to the east

Highest point
- Elevation: 3,810 feet (1,160 m)
- Prominence: 1,200 ft (370 m)
- Listing: Catskill High Peaks 13th
- Coordinates: 42°7.88′N 74°9.01′W

Geography
- Location within New York Location within the United States
- Location: Greene County, New York
- Parent range: Devil's Path (Catskills)
- Topo map: USGS Hunter

Sugarloaf Mountain is a mountain located in Greene County, New York. The mountain is part of the Devil's Path range of the Catskill Mountains. To the northwest, Sugarloaf is separated from Plateau Mountain by Mink Hollow Notch; to the southeast, Sugarloaf is separated from Twin Mountain by Pecoy Notch.

Sugarloaf Mountain stands within the watershed of the Hudson River, which drains into New York Bay. The northeastern slopes of Sugarloaf Mtn. drain into Schoharie Creek, thence into the Mohawk River, and the Hudson River. The northwestern slopes of Sugarloaf drain into Roaring Kill, thence into Schoharie Creek. The southwestern and southeastern slopes of Sugarloaf drain into Beaver Kill, thence into Esopus Creek, and the Hudson River.

Sugarloaf Mountain is within New York's Catskill State Park. The Devil's Path hiking trail traverses the summit ridge of Sugarloaf. The Long Path, a 357 mi (575 km) long-distance hiking trail through southeastern New York, is contiguous with this stretch of the Devil's Path.

== See also ==
- List of mountains in New York
- List of mountains named Sugarloaf
