= Arkville, New York =

- Hamlet
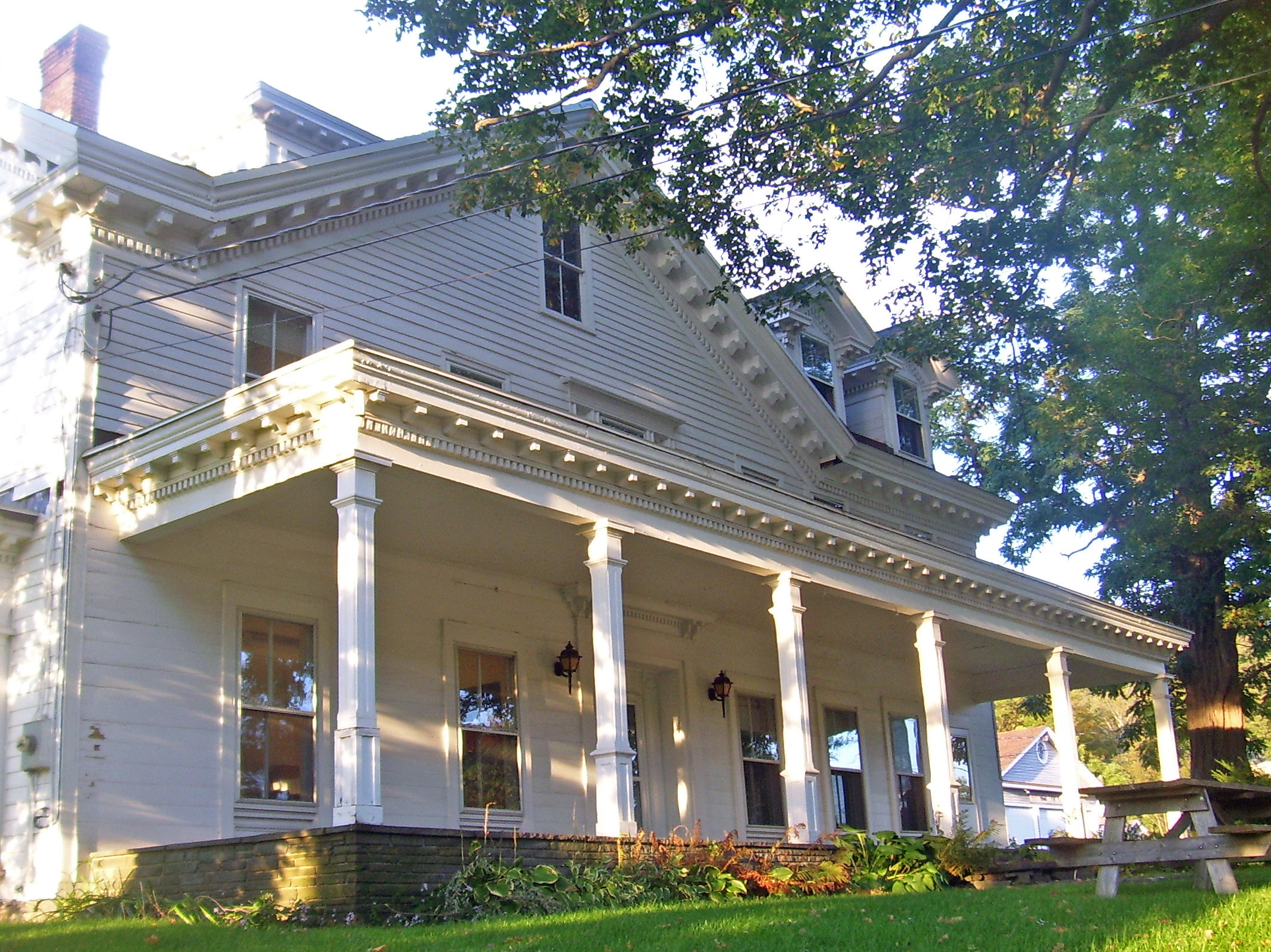
- The Erpf House in Arkville

- Location in New York Arkville (the United States)
- Coordinates: 42°8′52″N 74°37′11″W
- Country: United States
- State: New York
- County: Delaware
- Town: Middletown
- Elevation: 1,365 ft (416 m)
- Time zone: UTC-5 (Eastern (EST))
  - Summer (DST): UTC-4 (EDT)
- ZIP code: 12406
- Area code: 845
- GNIS feature ID: 942556

Arkville is a hamlet in the town of Middletown, Delaware County, New York, United States. It is located along New York State Route 28, one mile north of the village of Margaretville in the western Catskill Mountains. It has the ZIP code 12406.

Arkville is built either on or very close to the site of an old Lenape village called Pakatagkan.

The main office of the Catskill Center for Conservation and Development is located in the Erpf House along Route 28. The hamlet straddles the Catskill Park Blue Line, which moves from the former Ulster and Delaware Railroad tracks to Dry Brook and then the East Branch of the Delaware River a short distance to the west.

== Climate ==
This climatic region is typified by large seasonal temperature differences, with warm to hot (and often humid) summers and cold (sometimes severely cold) winters. According to the Köppen Climate Classification system, Arkville has a humid continental climate, abbreviated "Dfb" on climate maps.
