= Catskill Center for Conservation and Development =

US non-profit organization

- Formation: 1969; 57 years ago
- Type: Nonprofit
- Tax ID no.: 23-7058142
- Purpose: Environment and economic development
- Headquarters: Arkville, New York
- Method: Advocacy, invasive species management, environmental protection
- Board Chair: Margaret DiBenedetto
- Executive Director: Jeff Senterman
- Website: https://catskillcenter.org/

The Catskill Center for Conservation and Development, usually referred to as the Catskill Center, is a not-for-profit organization based in Arkville, New York, United States. It works to preserve the natural environment of the Catskill region and foster sustainable economic development in it.

Founded in 1969, it is headquartered in the historic Erpf House along state highway NY 28 in Arkville, just outside the Catskill Park Blue Line. It works to further its mission through different methods, from advocacy and land conservation to developing educational materials and sponsoring arts and cultural events.

== Programs ==
The Catskill Center staff oversees programs covering various areas: arts and culture, education and natural resources.

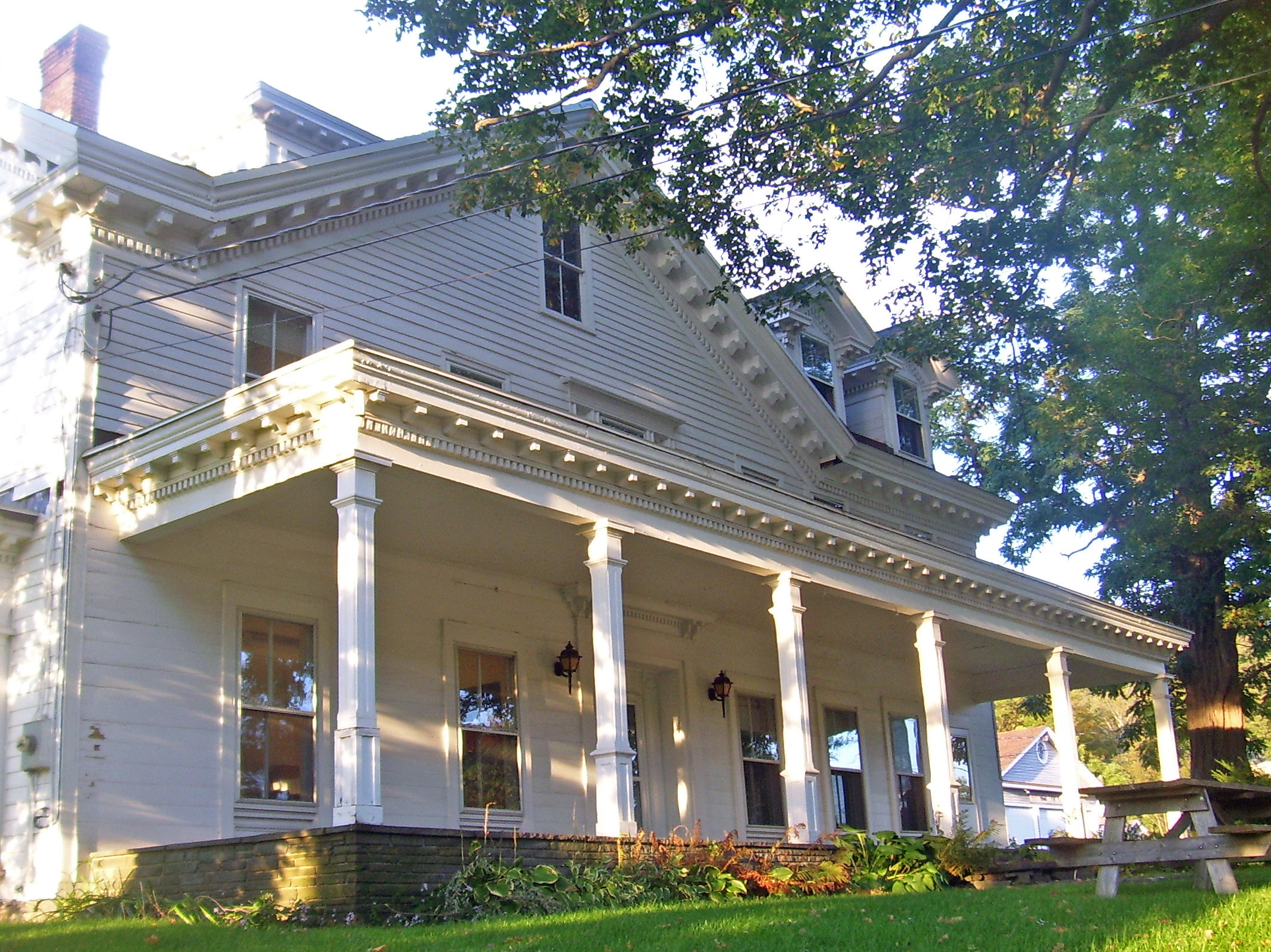
Erpf House in Arkville

Two programs cover the arts and culture section: the Erpf Gallery at the center's Arkville offices, and its artist-in-residence program at the 208-acre (84 ha) Platte Clove Preserve. The arts and culture section also maintains extensive historical archives.

The education program develops materials for local teachers to use as curriculum, especially the five-volume The Catskills: A Sense of Place. Other environmental education programs focus on the region's streams and watersheds. The natural resources program manages the Platte Clove Preserve and the 155-acre (63 ha) Esopus Bend near Saugerties. It also holds conservation easements on other key tracts in the region not part of the state-owned, "forever wild", Forest Preserve or otherwise protected.
