= Glenerie Falls =

- Location within New York Adirondack Park Location within the United States
- Location: Ulster County
- Coordinates: 42°01′13″N 73°58′58″W
- Watercourse: Esopus Creek

Glenerie Falls is a waterfall located in the Catskill Mountains of New York. It is located between Kingston and Saugerties.
