= Bakers Mills, New York =

- Hamlet
- Location within New York Location within the United States
- Coordinates: 43°36′53″N 74°01′29″W
- Country: United States
- State: New York
- County: Warren
- Elevation: 1,594 ft (486 m)
- Time zone: UTC-5 (Eastern (EST))
  - Summer (DST): UTC-4 (EDT)
- ZIP code: 12811
- Area codes: 518 & 838
- GNIS feature ID: 974178

Bakers Mills is a hamlet in Warren County, New York, United States. The community is located along state route 8, 28.5 miles (45.9 km) northwest of Glens Falls. Bakers Mills has a post office with ZIP code 12811.
