= Devil's Path (Catskills) =

Mountain range in the Catskills of the U.S. state of New York

Coordinates: 42.1339°N 74.1044°W

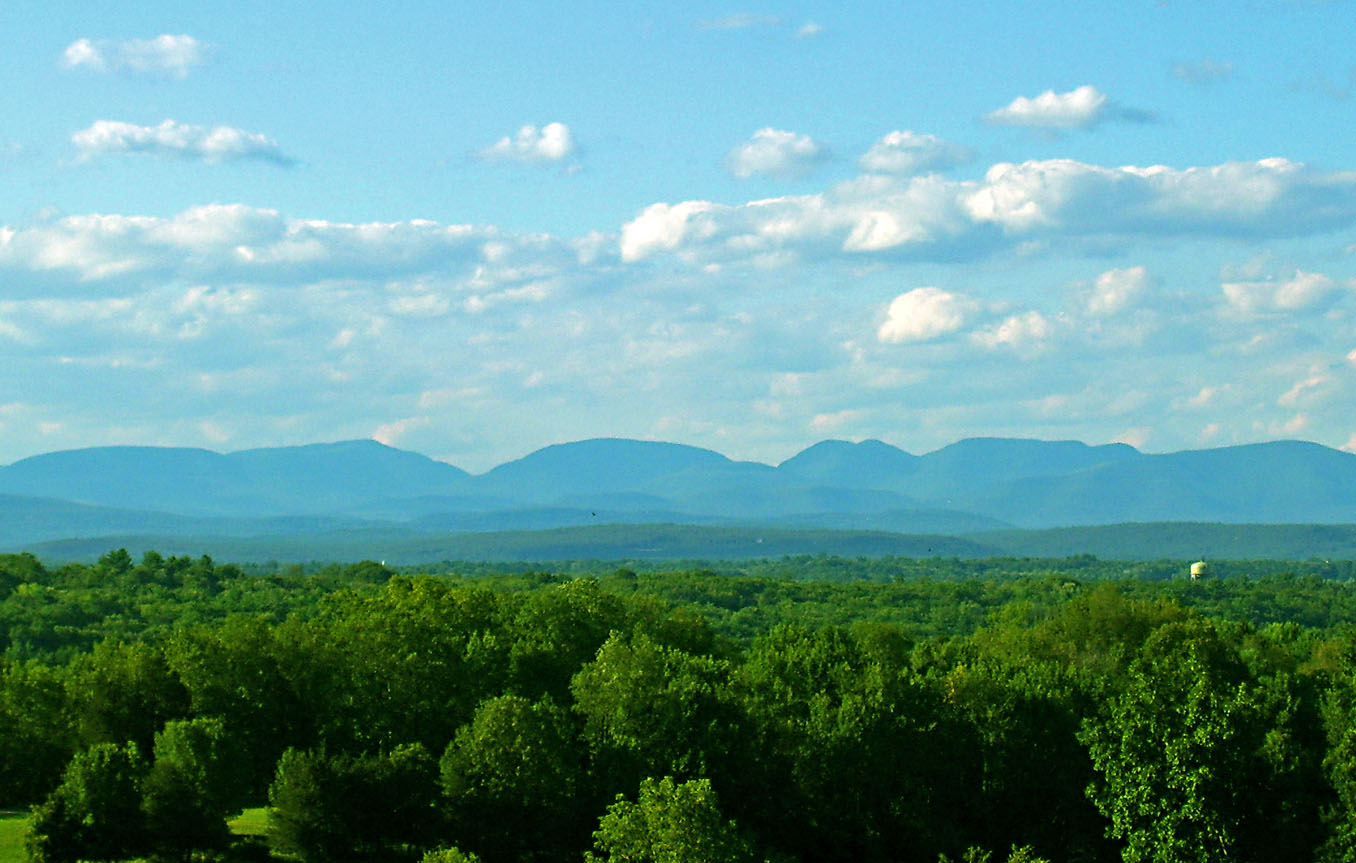
The Devil's Path, seen from the south. From left: Plateau, Sugarloaf, Twin and Indian Head. Overlook Mountain at right is not in the range.

The Devil's Path is a mountain range and hiking trail in the Greene County portion of New York's Catskill Mountains. The mountains commonly considered to be part of the Devil's Path are, from west to east, West Kill, Hunter, Plateau, Sugarloaf, Twin, and Indian Head. The range is perhaps most famous for the trail going through all peaks, Devil's Path trail.

The name comes from early settlers of the region, who believed the range's craggy cliffs were specially built by the devil so that he alone could climb them and occasionally retreat from the world of men. Today, they are famous for the deep gaps between them, which get lower in elevation as the mountains between them get higher when proceeding westward on the hiking trail.

The mountains and the land around them were acquired by the state as Forest Preserve and made part of the Catskill Park in the 1920s and 1930s. Today the area is managed by the New York State Department of Environmental Conservation as the Indian Head Wilderness Area.
