= Plattekill Creek =

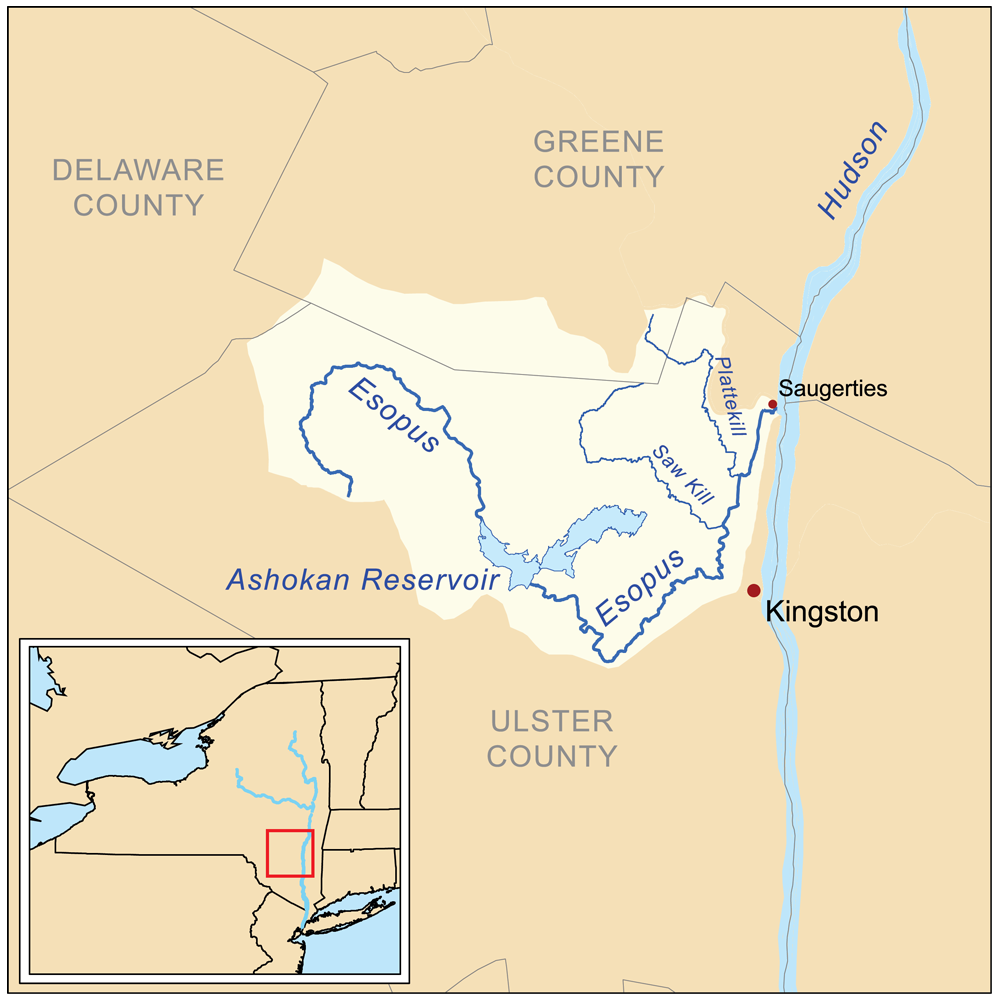
- Map of Esopus Creek watershed, showing Plattekill Creek

- Location of the mouth of Plattekill Creek Plattekill Creek (the United States)

Location
- Country: United States
- State: New York
- Region: Catskill Mountains
- Counties: Ulster, Greene

Physical characteristics
- Source: South slopes of Kaaterskill High Peak
  - coordinates: 42°09′13″N 74°04′37″W
- Mouth: Esopus Creek
  - coordinates: 42°01′17″N 73°59′16″W
  - elevation: 118 ft (36 m)
- Length: 16.7 mi (26.9 km)

Basin features
- Waterfalls: Old Mill Falls, Plattekill Falls, Bridal Veil Falls, Gray Rock Falls, Schalks Falls

Plattekill Creek is a 16.7-mile-long (26.9 km) tributary of Esopus Creek in the Catskill Mountains in the U.S. state of New York. From its source on the southern slopes of Kaaterskill High Peak, it flows across Ulster and Greene counties to the Esopus at Mount Marion. The name is a Dutch word meaning "flat brook".

Plattekill Creek passes through the Platte Clove Preserve, which is a 208-acre nature preserve, that includes Plattekill Falls along with other waterfalls and also trails. The preserve is located in Platte Clove in the town of Hunter.

== Recreation ==
New York's Department of Environmental Conservation (DEC) regularly stocks fish in the creek to supplement the native population. In spring 2020, the DEC stocked 360 12 to 15 inches (30 to 38 cm) and 2060 8 to 9 inches (20 to 23 cm) long brown trout into the creek in April, then another 1140 8 to 9 inches (20 to 23 cm) brown trout in May.

== Hydrology ==
New York's Department of Environmental Conservation (DEC) rates the water quality of Plattekill Creek in different sections. The lowermost section of the stream, from the mouth to Saugerties Reservoir in Blue Mountain, is rated Class B, suitable for primary and secondary contact recreation and fishing. The remaining section from the reservoir to the source has not been rated by the DEC.
