= Platte Clove =

Valley in New York State, USA

Coordinates: 42.126°N 74.074°W

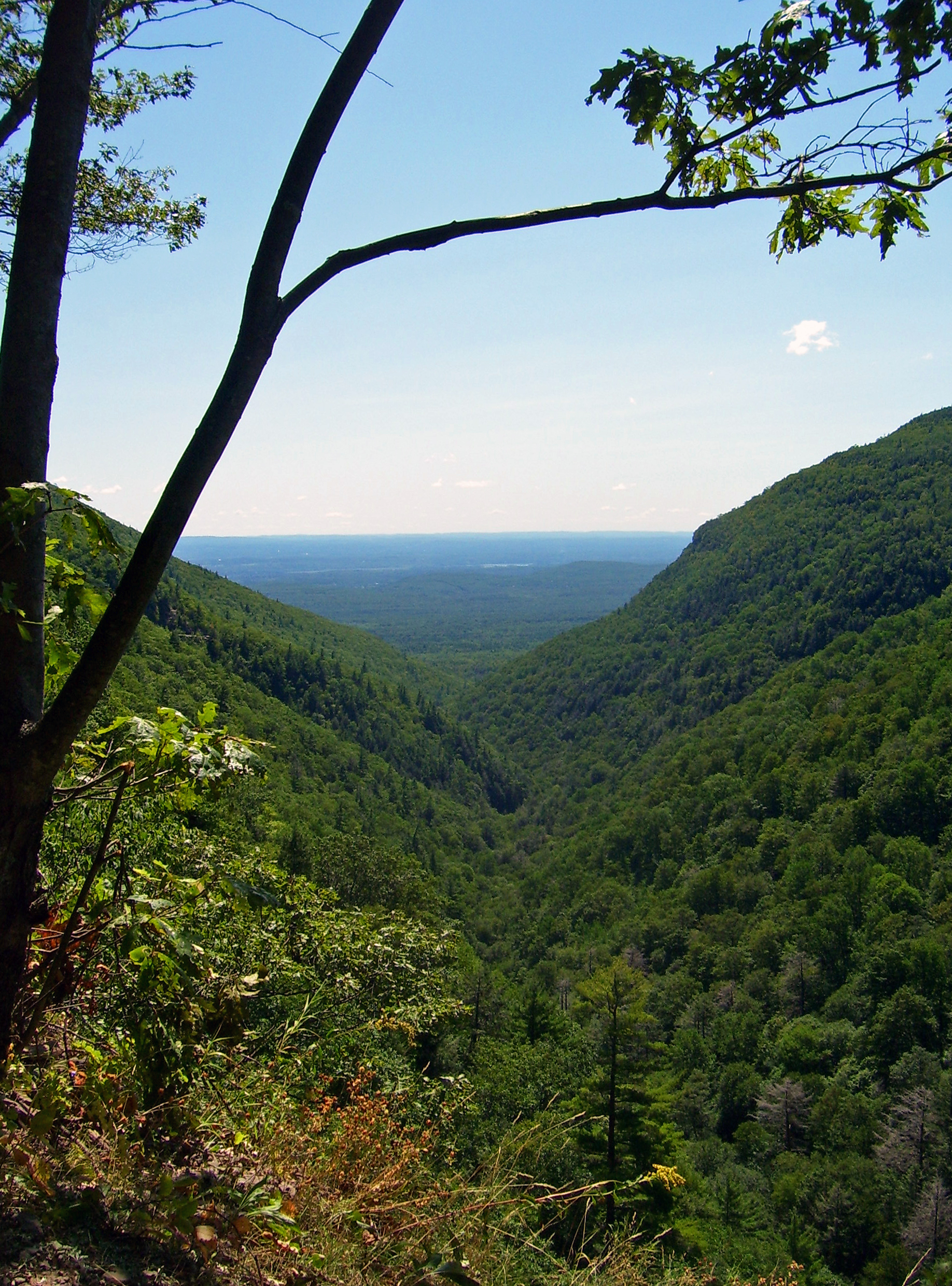
Looking east through Platte Clove toward the Hudson River and the Taconic Mountains in Connecticut and Massachusetts beyond. Views like this were an inspiration to artists of the Hudson River School.

Platte Clove, sometimes Plattekill Clove, is a narrow and steep valley in the Catskill Mountains of New York.

The valley is situated between Kaaterskill High Peak and Roundtop Mountain to the north and Plattekill Mountain and Indian Head Mountain to the south. It is mostly in Greene County, although the lowest, eastern portions are in Ulster County. The stream that runs below is called Plattekill Creek.

A few hiking trails go through the Clove including Devil's Path and Huckleberry Point Trail. The area hosts bicycle racing events.

== Geography ==
Along with Kaaterskill Clove on the other side of Kaaterskill High Peak, Platte Clove is one of only two breaks in the Catskill Escarpment. A narrow, two-lane road that climbs along the clove's north wall is the only route through the valley. This road, called Platte Clove Road, runs from Blue Mountain Road / Harry Wells Road in West Saugerties in the southeast until Rt 23A in Tannersville in the northwest.

The cliffs near the clove's head-wall have views of the nearby waterfalls – but have also been the site of fatal accidents. The area of Platte Clove known as Devil's Kitchen got its name due to the fact that the region is exceedingly difficult and dangerous for hikers. It runs from the top of the Platte Clove valley down into West Saugerties. The area is known to have a lot of timber rattlesnakes and northern copperheads. The south side is known to have hollow ground where a person can fall through the ground into rock crevices. There are places where one can pull back a conifer branch and find a drop of over 100'. In one hiking accident a man died in a place called Hell's Hole, and it took emergency medical services personnel three days to remove his body.

== History ==
In the early 19th century, early American artists were struck by the rugged, wild scenery of the clove and other locations in the northeastern Catskills. Depictions of this wilderness by Thomas Cole and others led to the artists being dubbed the Hudson River School.

In winter 1970 the body of a man was found on the slopes 50 feet (15 m) below Platte Clove Road a short distance past where it is closed at that time of year, near West Saugerties just short of the Greene County line. He carried no documents that would have identified him. The cause of death four gunshot wounds inflicted two days earlier; police believe he was killed elsewhere and disposed of in Platte Clove. His clothing and other items led them to theorize that he was from outside the U.S., possibly Europe or Brazil, and had possibly been lured to the country to be killed by organized crime without attracting too much attention in his native country; some local mobsters were interviewed about the case but did not provide any information. He remains unidentified; the New York State Police continue to investigate the case under the name West Saugerties John Doe.

In 2010, a man from the Albany suburb of Delmar lost his footing near one and fell 100 ft (30 m) to his death. On June 4 of the same year, Olivia Rose Belfiglio fell 100 feet from the top of a cliff and died at the bottom.

== Hiking ==
Hiking trails that run through the area are Devil's Path and Huckleberry Point Trail. The Long Path, a 357 mi (575 km) long-distance hiking trail that starts near the George Washington Bridge and ends in Albany, is contiguous with these trails. It comes from the south via Devil's Path, continues on the Overlook Trail, heads south on Platte Clove Road for 860 ft (262 m) and then heads north on Huckleberry Point Trail.

== Bicycle racing ==
The area is known for its bicycle racing traditions. The steepest section, which ascends up the side of the area called Devil's Kitchen, starts at the corner of Becker Road in West Saugerties and climbs 1,200 vertical feet (366 m) in 2.2 miles (3.54 km) into Elka Park. This section is renowned as one of the hardest climbs in the United States. It has an average grade of 12% over 1.6 miles, and a maximum grade of 16% over a distance of about 400'. The climb is categorized as a Hors catégorie climb, the hardest of all climbs, when including additional road heading further into Elka Park or eastward into West Saugerties. The Devil's Kitchen climb itself is classified as a Category 2 climb, due to its shorter distance. The climb is as challenging, or more challenging, than some of the toughest climbs in the Tour de France. Trucks and buses are banned from it throughout the year and all vehicle traffic is prohibited from it from November 1 to April 15, during which time it is not maintained or plowed. The Tour de Trump bicycle race was routed through here, and the road proved so steep that even some of the top bicyclists in the world had to get off and walk their bikes (it was raining that day). It also features prominently in the annual Tour of the Catskills bike race. Aurelien Passeron, who won the 2010 Tour of the Catskills, said the climb was steeper than Col du Tourmalet in the Tour de France, Verbier, or even Mont Ventoux, but was shorter.
