= Roundtop Mountain =

Roundtop Mountain may refer to the following mountains:

- Roundtop Mountain (Alaska)
- Roundtop Mountain (Greene County, New York)
- Roundtop Mountain (Ulster County, New York)
- Roundtop Mountain (Warren County, New York)

== See also ==
- Round Top Mountain
- Round Top (disambiguation)
