= Round Top =

Round Top or Roundtop may refer to:

== Communities ==
- Kirkwood, California, formerly Roundtop, a census-designated place
- Round Top, Pennsylvania, a community adjacent to the Gettysburg National Military Park
- Round Top, Texas, a town
- Roundtop, West Virginia, a former unincorporated community

== Other places ==
- Round Top Island (Tasmania), Australia
  - Round Top Island National Park
- Round Top (Alpine County, California), the highest peak in the Mokelumne Wilderness
- Round Top (Contra Costa County, California), an extinct volcano in the Berkeley Hills, just east of Oakland
- Round Top (Delaware County, New York)
- Roundtop (Franklin, Delaware County, New York)
- Roundtop (Roxbury, Delaware County, New York)
- Roundtop Mountain (Greene County, New York)
- Round Top (Livingston Manor, New York)
- Roundtop Mountain (Ulster County, New York)
- Ski Roundtop, a ski resort on Roundtop in York County, Pennsylvania
- Roundtop Trail, a hiking trail in the Great Smoky Mountains National Park of Tennessee, United States
- Round Top Mountain, an elevation in Hudspeth County, Texas

== Other uses ==
- Roundtop Filling Station, Sherwood, Arkansas, United States

== See also ==
- Little Round Top and Big Round Top, battle sites of the US Civil War
- List of summits named Round Top
