= List of summits named Round Top =

Round Top or Roundtop is the name of several summits, notably:

== In the United States ==
=== Northeastern US ===
- Round Top (New York), a Catskills summit of Kaaterskill High Peak
- Big Round Top, a hill in the Battle of Gettysburg
- Little Round Top, an important hill in the Battle of Gettysburg
- Roundtop (York County, Pennsylvania), a hill, home of the Roundtop Mountain Resort

=== Southeastern US ===
- Round Top (Georgia), a peak on the Appalachian Trail in Georgia
- Round Top Mountain (Arkansas), a summit in Polk County, 2,467 ft (752 m), (34.628°N 94.250°W)
- Round Top Mountain (Tennessee), in the Unaka Range of Sevier County, 3,000 ft (910 m)

=== Western US ===
- Little Round Top (California), a triple watershed point on the Sierra Crest (38°44′25″N 120°2′5″W)
- Round Top (Alpine County, California), the highest peak in the Mokelumne Wilderness at 10,381 ft (3,164 m) (38.66°N 120.00°W)
- Round Top (Contra Costa County, California), an extinct volcano in the Berkeley Hills of California, United States
- Round Top (Oregon), a mountain of the Northern Oregon Coast Range
- Round Top Mountain (Texas), mountain peak in the Trans-Pecos region of West Texas
- Round Top Mountain (Washington), in Colville National Forest, 1,940 m (6,360 ft)

== Other places ==
- Roundtop Mountain, Quebec, Canada

== See also ==
- Round Top (disambiguation)
