= Carl Mountain =

Mountain in New York, United States

- Location within New York Location within the United States

Highest point
- Elevation: 2,884 feet (879 m)
- Coordinates: 42°05′45″N 74°14′54″W

Geography
- Location: Phoenicia, New York, U.S.
- Topo map: USGS Bearsville

Carl Mountain is a mountain located in the Catskill Mountains of New York east-northeast of Phoenicia. Tremper Mountain is located southwest, and Mount Tobias is located southeast of Carl Mountain.
