= Snake Rocks =

Mountain in New York, United States

- Location within New York Location within the United States

Highest point
- Elevation: 1,207 feet (368 m)
- Coordinates: 42°01′33″N 74°09′19″W

Geography
- Location: Bearsville, New York, U.S.
- Topo map: USGS Saugerties

Snake Rocks is a mountain located in the Catskill Mountains of New York south of Bearsville. Acorn Hill is located west-northwest, and Ohayo Mountain is located east-southeast of Snake Rocks.
