= Burnt Hill (Delaware County, New York) =

Mountain in New York, United States

- Location within New York Location within the United States

Highest point
- Elevation: 2,900 feet (880 m)
- Coordinates: 42°15′32″N 74°41′08″W

Geography
- Location: New Kingston, New York, U.S.
- Topo map: USGS Hobart

Burnt Hill is a mountain located in Catskill Mountains of New York north of New Kingston. Round Top is located north of Burnt Hill and Mill Mountain is located west.
