= Menallen Township, Pennsylvania =

Menallen Township is the name of some places in the U.S. state of Pennsylvania:

- Menallen Township, Adams County, Pennsylvania
- Menallen Township, Fayette County, Pennsylvania
