= John Carpenter's unrealized projects =

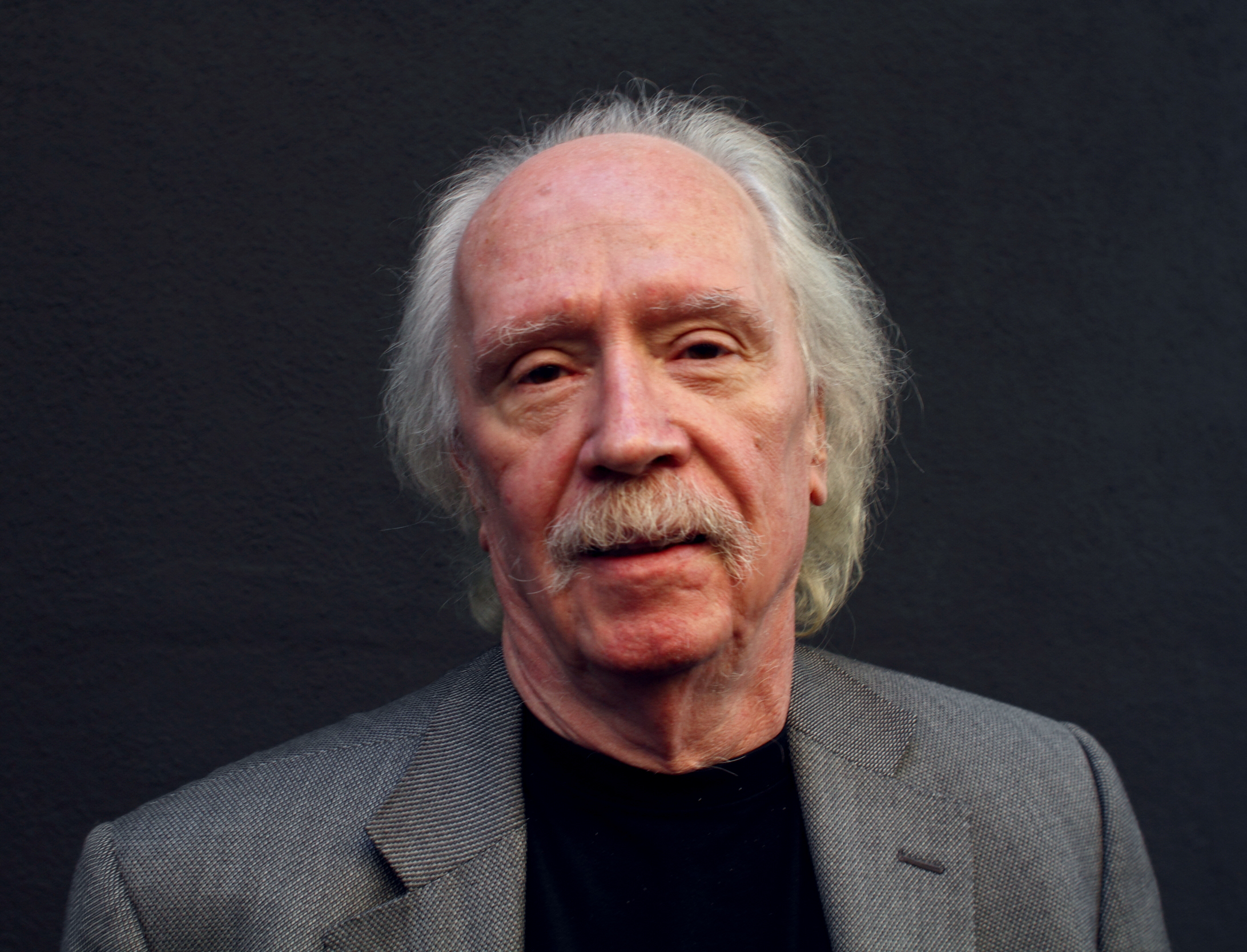
Carpenter pictured in North Hollywood, 2010

During a career that has spanned over 40 years, John Carpenter has worked on projects which never progressed beyond the pre-production stage. Some of the films were produced after he left production.

== 1970s ==
=== Blood River ===
In 1971, when he was a young screenwriter, Carpenter wrote the original Western spec script Blood River, which he wanted to direct. He had it sent to John Wayne's company, intending that the actor star, but received no feedback. "I'd love to have had [Howard] Hawks direct it but Hawks was too old," said Carpenter. "I would love to have directed it, but I don't think they would have let me." According to Carpenter biographer Gilles Boulenger, Blood River was "written expressly for the first screen teaming of 'The Duke', John Wayne, and 'The King', Elvis Presley." Two decades later, his script was used for a made-for-television film directed by Mel Damski.

=== They Bite ===
In 1975, after collaborating on the script of Dark Star, Carpenter and Dan O'Bannon had plans to co-write They Bite, later to be titled Drone. This was another sci-fi film which would have again seen Carpenter as director and O'Bannon as production designer. The basic concept followed ferocious insects that can imitate anything; Carpenter later conceded, "It was patently ripped off from John W. Campbell's story Who Goes There." He explained back in a 1980 interview for Cinefantastique what came of the project: "There came a point in our relationship when we decided not to continue working together. So he took over the project; that was what he was going to do next. I had developed the story with him, but he wrote the script. He took it around and got an option on it. The last thing I remember about the project, they sent me a letter, which I had to sign, saying I had no interest in the script." O'Bannon went on to repurpose ideas from They Bite into the script he wrote for Alien. Despite this, he still sought to publish They Bite as a novel.

=== Prey ===
Around 1975–76, a script entitled Prey was co-written by Carpenter with his fellow USC alumni James P. Nichols, for Warner Bros. Pictures. It centered on three teenage girls who set out to climb Mount Tobias but are attacked by two mountain men who seek to torture and kill them. Carpenter was a fan of Black Christmas, and requested Warners hire that film's director, Bob Clark, for Prey. Clark claimed the project did not proceed due to casting problems.

=== Eyes ===
Also in 1975, Carpenter wrote an original screenplay called Eyes, which later became Eyes of Laura Mars, directed by Irvin Kershner. At the beginning however, the script was picked up by Columbia producer Jon Peters, who hired Carpenter to rewrite it and potentially direct it as a star vehicle for Barbra Streisand. The producer then wanted to change the "style" of the story and Carpenter refused to oblige, so it was rewritten against his wishes. Carpenter later suggested that They Live represented "what I originally wanted to do with my script Eyes."

=== Meltdown ===
In an interview with Carpenter, he said: "Well, here's the story. Back in 1977 I was a writer, and took an assignment called the Prometheus Crisis, about a nuclear plant meltdown. It's kind of Halloween in a nuclear power plant. It's been 20 years since they were trying to set it up – and at one point it was supposed to go with Dolph Lundgren. But I haven't heard anything about it. I don't have any attachment to it anymore, but we'll see what happens with it." After several attempts, the project was about to start filming in June 1994 under the helm of director John Dahl with Dolph Lundgren in the lead role, but the production was shut down because of legal disputes regarding the US distribution rights claimed by several companies. Another attempt was announced in 1997 with actor Casper Van Dien but the ill-fated project still remains unproduced.

=== The Stars, My Destination ===
Since the 1970s, Carpenter has cited as his dream project a film adaptation of Alfred Bester's classic sci-fi novel The Stars, My Destination, about a rogue psychic seeking revenge in a future world where teleportation has changed everything. In a 1978 interview for Sight and Sound, Carpenter said "it would cost millions and millions of dollars, I'll never be able to do it." When asked during another interview two years later "What would a man like John Carpenter do with his imagination and talent if he was given $30 million?" he answered, "Well, I'll tell what I would do with $30 million. I would do a book called The Stars, My Destination by Alfred Bester. I would make that as the greatest science fiction novel-to-movie of all time." In 1985, the film came close to getting made, but Carpenter cautiously backed away from a screenplay by Lorenzo Semple Jr., commissioned by producer Jack Schwartzman. That year, Carpenter said the following: "Stars would have been a giant special-effects movie, requiring a huge time commitment on my part. It wouldn't have been an intimate film, and I was longing to do a picture with people in it. Schwartzman wanted to make it The Count of Monte Cristo in outer space. He had some ideas about how to do it cheaply, by making the world of the future look like the world of today. I thought that would destroy the book. We also couldn't hash out the ending. I liked the book's ending, but they wanted to change it." Carpenter later confirmed that there was indeed a script written but "it wasn't very good, so it never happened." He stopped persevering with the film after concluding that "it couldn't be done. I realized, you know what, it's a novel. That's what makes it work," and deemed some sequences of it "unfilmable". When asked in 2022 if there was a story he always wanted to adapt that he'd never gotten to, Carpenter singled out The Stars, My Destination.

=== A Descent Into the Maelstrom ===
In a 1978 interview for Sight and Sound, Carpenter said that he would love to adapt Edgar Allan Poe's 1841 short story "A Descent into the Maelström", stating, "I think it could be a tremendous film. But that's all in the future. I have to establish myself as a writer first, and then explore."

== 1980s ==
=== El Diablo ===
In 1980, after completing The Fog, it was intended that Carpenter's next film would be the "epic" horror-western passion project El Diablo, which he also wrote, for EMI. At this time, he chose to direct The Thing instead, as it was already greenlit. In a 1982 interview, Carpenter's producer Debra Hill mentioned El Diablo as one of their next collaborative projects. Though the projected budget of $20 million turned off most investors, there was brief talk that Dino De Laurentiis might produce it with Kurt Russell in the lead, but the screenplay would ultimately stay dormant until HBO bought it at the end of the decade. El Diablo aired in 1990, with Carpenter and Hill serving as executive producers. "They changed it a great deal," Carpenter said, noting how his Journey to the Center of the Earth-style ending was forced to be scrapped for financial reasons.

=== Total Recall ===
Also in 1980, Carpenter expressed enthusiasm about the possibility of directing what he called one of Dan O'Bannon's "most human" scripts, Total Recall. Carpenter described it as "a detective story set in the future, sort of like James Bond." At the time, however, he wasn't optimistic about the film getting made due to its expensive budget. O'Bannon's script was later produced in 1990, following rewrites, and was directed by Paul Verhoeven.

=== Firestarter ===
In 1981, during filming of The Thing, Universal Pictures offered him the chance to direct Firestarter, based on the novel by Stephen King. Carpenter respectively hired Bill Lancaster and Bill Phillips to adapt the novel into different versions of the screenplay. Carpenter had intended Richard Dreyfuss as Andy McGee, and Lancaster's father Burt Lancaster as Captain John Hollister, but when The Thing was a financial disappointment, Universal replaced Carpenter with Mark L. Lester, and the script was written by Stanley Mann. In May 2022, Carpenter, his son Cody Carpenter, and Daniel Davies composed the score for the 2022 remake.

=== Without a Trace ===
In 1982, Carpenter was working on the screenplay for the 1984 film The Philadelphia Experiment, entitled Without a Trace, but struggled to complete the third act. In the end, his screenplay was completely rewritten by Wallace C. Bennett, with Carpenter's official credit on the film being an executive producer.

=== The Ninja ===
In 1983, Irvin Kershner was replaced by Carpenter as director of a planned film adaptation of The Ninja, for Richard D. Zanuck and David Brown for 20th Century Fox. That year, Carpenter co-wrote a brand new script with Tommy Lee Wallace, but it turned out to not be filmable. Unable to produce a workable draft, he left the project a year later. Subsequently, Joe Wizan became the new head of Fox and put The Ninja and other projects that were given the greenlight into turnaround.

=== Santa Claus: The Movie ===
In 1984, Carpenter was one of many directors attached to helm Santa Claus: The Movie, intending to cast Brian Dennehy or Wilford Brimley as the titular character. However, Carpenter hated the screenplay and pushed to write his own draft, additionally wanting to compose the film's musical score. The studio was uninterested in Carpenter doing anything besides directing and he eventually left the project over creative differences. Jeannot Szwarc would go on to direct the final project with David Huddleston playing Santa Claus.

=== Top Gun ===
Also in 1984, Carpenter was offered a chance to direct Top Gun, but quickly turned it down. He did not see it being much of a success at all and thought that fighting the Soviet Union in the third act would not do any favors for already hostile international relations during the Cold War. Even in recent years, he has noted that there was nothing he could think of that he could have done with that movie; it just was not for him. Tony Scott was eventually chosen to direct the film.

=== The Golden Child ===
In 1985, Carpenter was offered the chance to direct The Golden Child, but he preferred the similar script for Big Trouble in Little China, starring Kurt Russell. Michael Ritchie ended up directing the film. "The films have a similar theme in that they both explore Chinese legend and magic, but they develop in different ways," Carpenter said. "Golden Child is a very fine script. It has its problems, but it also has one big plus—Eddie Murphy. It will be hard to pull off that script. But if they do, it could be a wonderful movie!"

=== Chickenhawk ===
Also in 1985, a film version of the novel was set to be written and directed by Carpenter for New World Pictures, but his script was discarded by studio co-chairman Robert Rehme.

=== Judgment Night ===
According to director Stephen Hopkins, Carpenter was called in by the studio to draft a new screenplay for his film, which ultimately was not used.

=== Armed and Dangerous ===
In an August 1986 interview, John Candy revealed that Carpenter was initially attached to direct the film Armed and Dangerous, but was eventually replaced by Mark L. Lester. According to Carpenter, the original co-star Dan Aykroyd "wanted a big car chase at the end. I liked the script the way it was. Aykroyd threw a temper tantrum because I wouldn't change it. This is known in the movie business as 'creative differences.' I withdrew from the picture."

=== Fatal Attraction ===
Carpenter was offered a chance to direct the 1987 film Fatal Attraction, but he just was not interested in it at all. He has famously mentioned turning this down by saying that he read the script and basically told them that he had already seen this movie when it was called Play Misty for Me, thinking the movie was going to tank at the box office. Adrian Lyne ended up directing the film.

=== Halloween 4: The Return of Michael Myers ===
Cannon Films, who had just finished 1986's release of The Texas Chainsaw Massacre 2, approached Carpenter to write and direct Halloween 4: The Return of Michael Myers. Debra Hill planned to produce the film, while Carpenter teamed up with Dennis Etchison who, under the pseudonym Jack Martin, had written novelizations of both Halloween II (1981) and Halloween III: Season of the Witch (1982) to write a script to Halloween 4. Originally, Joe Dante was Carpenter's choice for director on the project itself. However, producer Moustapha Akkad rejected the Etchison script, calling it "too cerebral" and insisting that any new Halloween sequel must feature Michael Myers as a flesh and blood killer. In an interview, Etchison explained how he received the phone call informing him of the rejection of his script. Etchison said, "I received a call from Debra Hill and she said, 'Dennis, I just wanted you to know that John and I have sold our interest in the title Halloween and unfortunately, your script was not part of the deal." Carpenter and Hill had signed all of their rights away to Akkad, who gained ownership. Akkad said, "I just went back to the basics of Halloween on Halloween 4 and it was the most successful." As Carpenter refused to continue his involvement with the series, a new director was sought out. Dwight H. Little replaced Carpenter. Little had previously directed episodes for Freddy's Nightmares and the film Bloodstone.

=== Shadow Company ===
After finishing the 1988 film They Live, Carpenter was going to direct an action horror film called Shadow Company. Written by Shane Black (who was to produce it) and Fred Dekker, the project was to be executive produced by Walter Hill (who also co-wrote some of the script) with Kurt Russell in the main role. The script was about a group of US Special Forces soldiers who died during the Vietnam War. Years later, after their bodies are brought back, the soldiers, who were members of an Army project involving dark experiments, rise up from their graves, raid the armory from a nearby base, and attack the town in which they were buried, killing everyone during Christmas night. Due to problems in pre-production that many won't disclose, the movie was never made, although the original 1988 script has gained a cult following from fans of Carpenter, Black and Dekker.

=== They Live II: Hypnowar ===
For a brief time, Carpenter intending to do a sequel to They Live, subtitled Hypnowar, but it was shelved after his lawsuit with Alive Films. In 1996, while promoting Escape from L.A., he revealed that he'd always wanted to make a sequel to They Live as it's one of his favorite films, but was never able to get interest or financial backing for the project.

=== Victory Out of Time ===
In 1987, Carpenter signed a four picture deal with producers Shep Gordon and Andre Blay. After the first two films were produced, Prince of Darkness and They Live, he was set to begin production on Victory Out of Time in 1989. However, due to a lack of funding, the production was canceled. In 2011, Carpenter answered on Twitter that Victory Out of Time was a "different take on time travel."

=== At Midnight ===
A fourth film in the Alive Films-Carpenter agreement, entitled At Midnight, from a screenplay co-written with long-time collaborator Tommy Lee Wallace, also went unproduced. No plot details are known.

=== The Exorcist III ===
In 1989, Carpenter was offered The Exorcist III, and met with writer William Peter Blatty (who also authored the novel on which it was based, Legion) during the course of a week. However, the two disagreed about the film's climax and Carpenter refused the project. Blatty directed the film himself a year later.

=== Pincushion ===
In 1989, Carpenter was going to direct Pincushion, a post-apocalyptic odyssey from rookie writer John Raffo (which producer Scott Rudin purchased during the writers' strike for $500,000). The film's relatively modest budget escalated towards $20 million, when Cher was cast in the lead role of the driver in post-plague America who must deliver a life-saving serum to save Salt Lake City. The film went undeveloped, leading to copies of the script being sold online.

=== Two Evil Eyes ===
In the late 1980s, Carpenter was offered to direct a segment of the anthology film Two Evil Eyes (1990), but he declined due to scheduling issues.

== 1990s ==
=== Tombstone ===
In the early 1990s, Carpenter was going to direct the 1993 western film Tombstone. In the end, the film was directed by George P. Cosmatos and stars frequent Carpenter collaborator Kurt Russell.

=== Creature from the Black Lagoon remake ===
In 1992, Carpenter was developing the remake of Creature from the Black Lagoon at Universal Pictures. He originally hired Bill Phillips to write the script while Rick Baker was hired to create the 3D model of the Creature. Nigel Kneale was also linked as screenwriter, but the project never got greenlit partly due to the critical and box office failure of Memoirs of an Invisible Man.

=== The Beast ===
Also in 1992, Carpenter scripted a screen adaption of the underwater creature thriller Beast by Peter Benchley. He delivered his draft to Universal Pictures executives, but was met with disinterest. According to Benchley, "Beast was sold to Universal as a feature, but, after receiving scripts from both me and John Carpenter, the studio deemed it too expensive – around $30 million." The book would go on to be adapted into a two-part miniseries for NBC, albeit with a completely different script. Carpenter's unproduced version is housed among Benchley's papers in the Howard Gotlieb Archival Research Center at Boston University.

=== So Help Me God ===
In the early-to-mid-1990s, Carpenter was attached to direct Larry Cohen's script So Help Me God as a low-budget film. The project, which was set up at New Line Cinema, was described as a contemporary courtroom drama where "the ultimate evil possesses an ordinary man who commits several gruesome murders." Other directors who circled the project include Michael Anderson, Bradford May, and Tom Holland.

=== Dracula in Europe ===
One project of Carpenter's that was developed sometime in the 1990s but never got off the ground was described as a "traditional" vampire film, entitled Dracula in Europe. In a 2021 interview, where he was asked whether or not he would return to directing, Carpenter said, "it has to be something I love. A Dracula movie would be nice."

=== Escape from Earth ===
A third installment in the Escape from... series was planned during the development of Escape from L.A. and was intended to go into production following its release. However, due to the film's poor performance at the box office, these plans were ultimately scrapped. According to Carpenter, the third entry—tentatively titled Escape from Earth—"was kind of Snake Plissken in a space capsule, flying interstellar. So there'd be a lot of special effects in it. Which I never care about too much. But that's what it would look like."

=== Untitled Howard Hawks documentary ===
Carpenter reportedly worked on a documentary film on his idol, Howard Hawks, throughout the majority of the 1990s. "Every time I get somebody interested, there's always the problem of how much money they're willing to spend on it," he said in a 1996 interview. The British Film Institute showed interest, but wanted the video clips to be shot on tape as opposed to 35mm film. Carpenter refused, saying, "You can't do a movie about a classic Hollywood director on videotape. I'm sorry; I just won't do that."

=== Only Angels Have Wings remake ===
When asked in June 1996 if he could remake any film of his choosing, Carpenter named Howard Hawks' 1939 classic Only Angels Have Wings, saying that he'd ideally do it "maybe with Kurt Russell. I might have Sam Neill play the Richard Barthelmess part. And I might have Jeff Bridges as Thomas Mitchell." He later remarked that he had wanted to direct an update of the film, but "it's probably good that I didn't."

=== The Mutant Chronicles ===
In November 1996, it was reported that Carpenter had signed to direct The Mutant Chronicles, a fantasy-adventure adapted from the role-playing game to be shot in the UK, with Edward R. Pressman producing. The following year, it was indicated in Cinefantastique that plans for the film were in limbo after Pressman struggled to regroup upon the box office failures of Judge Dredd (1995), The Crow: City of Angels and The Island of Dr. Moreau (both 1996). Ultimately, Carpenter allegedly left the project after the producers denied his request for a larger budget.

=== Untitled Western sci-fi film ===
In an issue of the French magazine Mad Movies around the same time as Mutant Chronicles, it was indicated that Carpenter's next film would be a "Western with a sci-fi twist", about an extraterrestrial that lands in the Wild West, from a screenplay by Frank Darabont. Carpenter later corroborated this claim, saying, "I had a western come along that I liked, but they wanted to turn it into a science‑fiction movie!"

=== Halloween H20: 20 Years Later ===
Carpenter was originally in consideration to direct the Halloween (1978) sequel project, Halloween H20: 20 Years Later (1998) at the request of Jamie Lee Curtis who wanted to reunite the cast and crew of the original film. Carpenter agreed to direct the film, but his starting fee was $10 million. Carpenter claimed the hefty figure was compensation for revenue he had never received from the original Halloween, a matter that was still a point of contention between Carpenter and Halloween producer Moustapha Akkad. When Akkad balked at the requested salary, Carpenter quit the project and therefore once again refused to continue his involvement. Steve Miner assumed directing of Halloween H20: 20 Years Later, which was a commercial success despite receiving mixed reviews.

== 2000s ==
=== Untitled Halloween / Hellraiser crossover film ===
According to Doug Bradley and Clive Barker, Carpenter was intended to direct a crossover film between the Halloween and Hellraiser series which Barker would have written and would have been released in 2004. However, the Akkad family and fans of both series disliked the idea, and it was abandoned.

=== Psychopath ===
In 2005, Titan Productions announced Psychopath, a first-person action video game, was being made in collaboration with Carpenter. Titan stated that the game would revolve around a former CIA operative who is forced back into duty to stop a serial killer. Titan's aim in the industry was to push projects through multiple forms of media. In conjunction with the game, a film version of Psychopath was in the works. Carpenter was to direct the film as well as the game's cutscenes and character design but neither the game or the film were ever released.

=== Zombieland TV pilot ===
In 2006, Carpenter was one of the first to be attached to Zombieland, when it was still envisioned as a TV pilot. He had been tapped to helm the pilot, seemed excited to do it, then faded away from the project when it transitioned into becoming the feature film directed by Ruben Fleischer.

=== The Haunting in Connecticut ===
In early 2007, Gold Circle Films was reportedly discussing a directing contract with Carpenter for The Haunting in Connecticut. Although Carpenter was initially interested, the deal quickly fell through due to creative differences. Carpenter did enjoy the film's concept and would later agree to direct The Ward due to its similarities in tone and theme with The Haunting in Connecticut.

=== L.A. Gothic ===
In July 2007, details emerged about a new Carpenter film, entitled L.A. Gothic; alleged to revolve around a priest and his teenage daughter battling creatures such as vampires, zombies and a demon-possessed rock star. It was said to take place in Los Angeles over the course of several days and was described as "vintage Carpenter [with] tons of gore and action." In January the following year, ShockTillYouDrop.com confirmed the project was indeed real, with it reportedly in the casting phase and aimed to commence shooting sometime in March. Jim Agnew and Sean Keller wrote the screenplay, and Josh Kesselman and Danny Sherman of Principal Entertainment were producing the film. The logline read: "Five interwoven stories of high-octane horror centering on a vengeful ex-priest's efforts to protect his teenage daughter from the supernatural evils of L.A.'s dark side."

=== Riot ===
In August 2008, Carpenter was working on a project called Riot, written by Joe Gazzam. Originally titled Scared Straight!, based on the popular 1978 documentary, the prison thriller tells the story of a troubled youth who is sent to the Scared Straight crime-prevention program. But when a riot breaks out and the prisoners take him hostage, a lifer played by Nicolas Cage is forced to help the young man out.

=== The Prince ===
In November 2008, Jeremy Passmore and Andre Fabrizio's script of The Prince was announced as in the process of being developed by Carpenter into a film that he would direct. Passmore described it at the time as "Unforgiven [but] as a gangster movie," and added that the version he, Fabrizio and Carpenter were happiest with was "brutal and violent and dark at the end". The film was ultimately directed by Brian A. Miller, and released straight-to-VOD in 2014.

== 2010s ==
=== F.E.A.R. 3 ===
In April 2010, Carpenter announced he would join the F.E.A.R. franchise, offering himself as a spokesman and to help direct the cinematics for F.E.A.R. 3. His only official credits on F.E.A.R. 3 were storyline consultant and narrator, showing no confirmation that he actually did direct the cinematics of the game.

=== Fangland ===
In June 2010, ComingSoon.net announced that Carpenter was tapped by Sriram Das and Blumhouse Productions to direct an adaptation of John Marks' novel Fangland, with Hilary Swank set to lead. However, in 2014, Carpenter updated that "Fangland is not going to go through."

=== Darkchylde ===
In October 2010, it was announced Carpenter was to direct the film of the comic book character Darkchylde, created by Randy Queen. In 2012, producer Sandy King stated that the script was being rewritten and that the special effects would almost entirely be practical. In 2014, Carpenter stated, "Darkchylde is [still] in development. We're going out to various money sources, and we'll see what happens."

=== The Benders ===
In a May 2011 interview promoting his newest film The Ward, Carpenter divulged that there was a "little Gothic Western" project he might direct next, as well as Darkchylde, and a "high-gloss" psychological thriller. The following month, this project was revealed to be The Benders; about the infamous German immigrant family of serial killers who murdered travelers in the early 1870s Kansas. "[The script] has this amazing female character who's the come-on, she was out there sexually luring them in there, and nobody knows what happened to the Benders. There are a lot of theories and we use one in the story. We're working on it now, and it could be great," said Carpenter. At the Fright Night Film Fest in July, he took part in a Q&A with Fangoria magazine wherein he reiterated that he was working on a gothic Western but was careful not to refer to it as a horror film: "[A horror Western] doesn't really work... they tried it in the old days, they tried Jesse James Meets Frankenstein['s Daughter] and Billy the Kid [Versus] Dracula... a Western should be a Western." Asked about his favorite current actors, he said, "Amy Adams [...] I'd love to work with her." In another interview given in October, Carpenter called the project "odd" and "interesting subject matter." He added, "We'll see if we can get it made. These are interesting different times in the movie business these days. And I'm an old-timer, who wants to see a movie by me." Though reluctant to give away further details, he described it as a cross between True Grit and The Silence of the Lambs.

=== Dead Space ===
In 2013, Carpenter expressed interest in making a Dead Space film, due to his desire for a horror franchise movie that might surpass Resident Evil. Justin Marks would write the script, but adapting the game storyline and the characters did not make production easy. EA had plans to adapt the Dead Space video games into a potential film franchise. In 2023, Carpenter remarked that a film was in development, albeit with a different director than him.

=== Untitled horror film ===
In 2014, while chatting to Fangoria, Carpenter said that he had explored directing for independent production companies and that he and two screenwriters had recently taken a film project to Blumhouse Productions. They turned it down and Carpenter said, "I guess I won't be working with them." While this unspecified pitch was rejected, Carpenter would go on to develop a highly successful partnership with Jason Blum, executive producing and scoring the Halloween reboot trilogy. At the 2019 Cannes Film Festival, Carpenter stated that he wanted to "make a little horror film." Detailing specifically what he had in mind, Carpenter said, "It would be a project that I like that's budgeted correctly. Nowadays they make these young directors do movie for $2 million when the movie is written for $10 million. So you have to squeeze it all in there and I don't want to do that any more."

=== Nightside TV series ===
On July 6, 2017, Carpenter announced that he was developing Simon R. Green's novel Nightside into a television series for Universal Cable Productions.

=== Tales for a Halloween Night TV series ===
On July 6, 2017, Carpenter announced that he was adapting his graphic novel Tales for a Halloween Night into a television series for the Syfy channel. On March 15, 2019, Sandy King announced that Tales for a Halloween Night has been scrapped. In August 2019, development on the series was revived by Paramount Television.

== 2020s ==
=== Untitled secret project ===
In August 2022, Carpenter announced to the Pittsburgh Post-Gazette that he had a few projects "lined up and percolating" that would involve him as a director, writer and composer. In January 2023, he confirmed that he was working on a potential new project, but refused to reveal any details, adding that it was "shrouded in total mystery, like Skull Island." Carpenter then told the Cahiers du Cinéma, in their April 2023 issue, that—even though he walked away from the business—he was continuing to work on "one or two things", adding "I have a little idea right now, I'm trying to find the second act. We'll see!"

=== Suburban Screams season 2 ===
In October 2023, Sandy King expressed interest in making further seasons of Carpenter's Suburban Screams, saying "I think that it would be really fun to see how deep we can go and how many weird things really happen".

=== Cathedral film ===
Speaking to Rolling Stone in 2026 to promote his new horror comic and accompanying synth-driven soundtrack of Cathedral, Carpenter admitted that he initially developed the idea as a film. He and collaborator Daniel Davies got as far as considering actors who could star, before ultimately opting the more affordable path of making a graphic novel; as Carpenter believed it would take over $100 million to film it properly. Asked if he would possibly make Cathedral using AI to save money, Carpenter said he would consider it. "I'm not going to say no to anything. But sure, I have mixed feelings about AI," he clarified. Though he "[came] very close" to making another film several times, each project "keeps coming and going, and there's one reason or another I haven't."

== Composer only ==
=== Escape from New York anime spin-off ===
In 2003, it was reported that Carpenter would score the music for a Japanese anime spin-off of Escape from New York, with Outlaw Star's Mitsuru Hongo slated to direct.

=== Planet Terror ===
In January 2007, Carpenter was approached to write the music for the Robert Rodriguez film Planet Terror. In the end, he decided not to write it, with Rodriguez eventually taking over and drawing inspiration from Carpenter's music. Rodriguez ended up using a cue from the Escape From New York score in the finished film.

=== Death of a Unicorn ===
In November 2023, Carpenter, along with Cody Carpenter and Daniel Davies, were going to compose and write the music for the comedy horror film Death of a Unicorn (2025). However, in February 2025, Dan Romer and Giosuè Greco were revealed to have taken over.

=== Untitled Bong Joon Ho horror film ===
In March 2025, Carpenter publicly agreed to write the score for Bong Joon Ho's next horror film after Ally (2027).

== See also ==
- John Carpenter filmography
