= Little Tonshi Mountain =

Mountain in New York, United States

- Location within New York Location within the United States

Highest point
- Elevation: 1,818 feet (554 m)
- Coordinates: 41°59′58″N 74°12′04″W

Geography
- Location: Phoenicia, New York, U.S.
- Topo map: USGS Ashokan

Little Tonshi Mountain is a mountain located in the Catskill Mountains of New York southeast of Phoenicia. Beetree Hill is located north, and Tonshi Mountain is located east-northeast of Little Tonshi Mountain.
