= Ticetonyk Mountain =

Mountain in New York, United States

- Location within New York Location within the United States

Highest point
- Elevation: 2,510 feet (770 m)
- Coordinates: 42°00′11″N 74°13′03″W

Geography
- Location: Phoenicia, New York, U.S.
- Topo map: USGS Bearsville

Ticetonyk Mountain is a mountain located in the Catskill Mountains of New York southeast of Phoenicia. Tremper Mountain is located northwest, and Tonshi Mountain is located east of Ticetonyk Mountain.
