= Aspers =

Aspers may refer to:

- Aspers, Pennsylvania
- Aspers, plural of asper, English name of the Byzantine aspron coin
- Aspers, plural of asper, English name of the Ottoman akçe coin
- Aspers, nickname of John Aspinalls, founder of Crown London Aspinalls
