= Round Top (Delaware County, New York) =

Mountain in New York, United States

- Location within New York Location within the United States

Highest point
- Elevation: 3,068 feet (935 m)
- Coordinates: 42°16′17″N 74°41′00″W

Geography
- Location: New Kingston, New York, U.S.
- Topo map: USGS Hobart

Round Top is a mountain located in the Catskill Mountains of New York north of New Kingston. Burnt Hill is located south of Round Top and Mill Mountain is located west-southwest.
