= Gettysburg Formation =

Rock Formation

- Stratigraphic range: Late Triassic
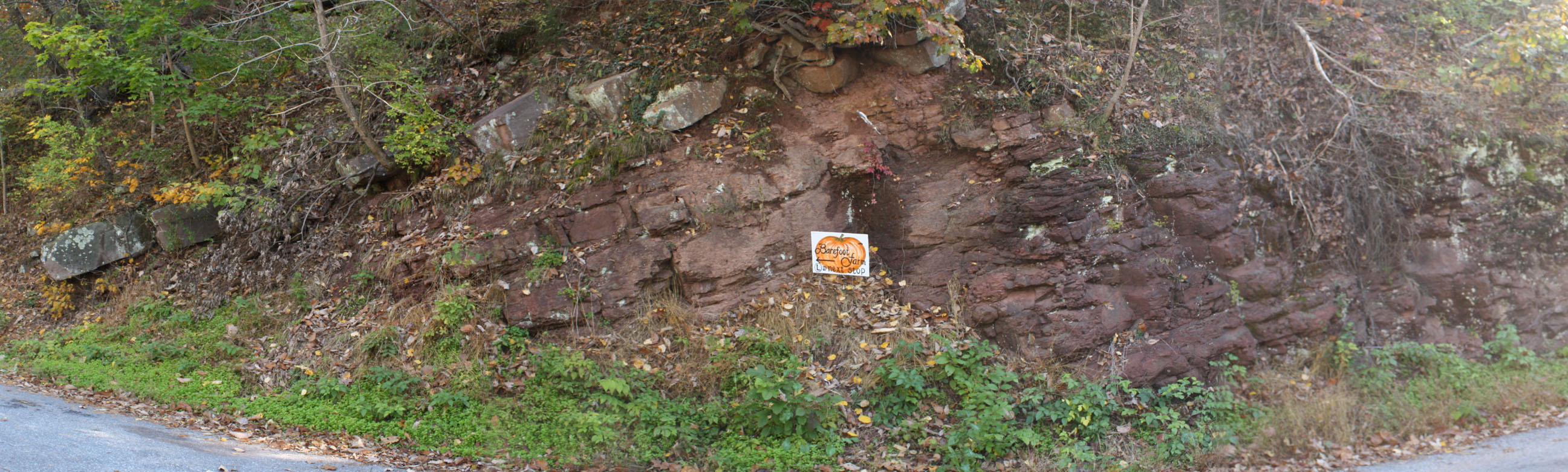
- Outcrop of Gettysburg Formation along Conewago Road in York County, Pennsylvania, facing east from the bridge over Conewago Creek
- Type: sedimentary
- Unit of: Newark Supergroup
- Sub-units: Heidlersburg member, Arendtsville fanglomerate lentil, Elizabeth Furnace conglomerate member, Conewago conglomerate member
- Overlies: New Oxford Formation
- Thickness: 5000 m (16,000 feet)

Lithology
- Primary: sandstone, conglomerate
- Other: shale

Location
- Extent: Pennsylvania, Maryland

Type section
- Named for: Gettysburg, Pennsylvania
- Named by: Stose and Bascom, 1929

The Gettysburg Formation is a mapped bedrock unit consisting primarily of sandstones, conglomerates, and shales.

The Gettysburg Formation was first described in the Gettysburg area of Adams County, Pennsylvania in 1929, and over the following decade was mapped in adjacent York County, Pennsylvania and Frederick County, Maryland. It was then typically called the "Gettysburg shale," and was described as "thick red shales and soft red sandstones." The majority of this early mapping was done by G. W. Stose, A. I. Jonas, and Florence Bascom. Later workers described it as "Red, medium- to fine-grained sandstone and shale."

The rock unit was formalized into a Formation in 1963 by J. D. Glaeser. Glaeser re-mapped some areas previously mapped as the Gettysburg Formation to the Hammer Creek Formation.

A major groundwater resources study of the Gettysburg Formation and other formations of the Newark Supergroup in Pennsylvania was published by Charles R. Wood in 1980.

== Depositional Environment ==
The Gettysburg Formation and other formations of the Newark Supergroup were deposited in the Gettysburg Basin, just one of many Triassic rift basins existing on the east coast of North and South America, which formed as plate tectonics pulled apart Pangaea into the continents we see today.

The conglomerates within the formation were most likely alluvial fan or mudflow deposits, or possibly talus, eroding directly from the Precambrian and early Paleozoic rocks to the north and south. The sandstones and shales were most likely deposited in the flooded rift valley as deltas.

== Stratigraphy ==
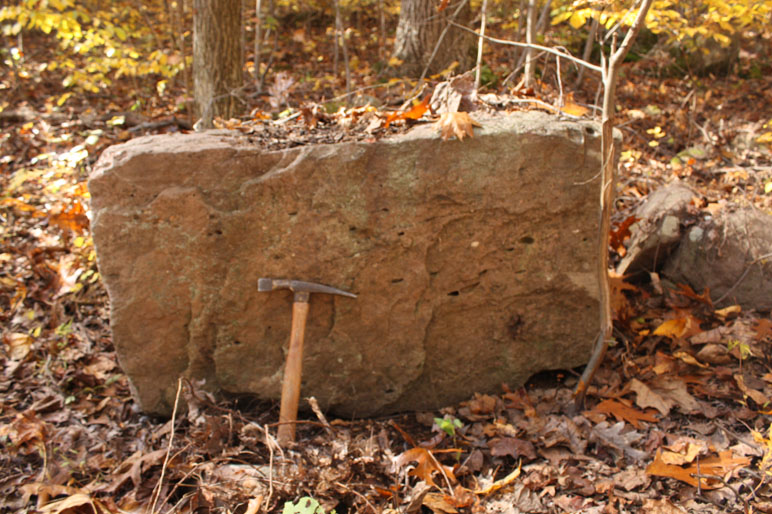
Boulder of the conglomerate along Crone Road near the top of the Conewago Mountains (rock hammer for scale)

The Gettysburg Formation is conformably underlain by the New Oxford Formation, which is the basal unit of the Newark Supergroup in south-central Pennsylvania. The Gettysburg is mapped from the Maryland border through Adams, Cumberland, and Lancaster Counties to the southern borders of Dauphin and Lebanon Counties. In these counties and to the north the rock unit is called the Hammer Creek Formation. The formation also encompasses the York Haven Diabase in York county.

The Gettysburg Formation is divided into several members. The upper part is sometimes referred to as the Conewago conglomerate, and the Conewago Mountains in York County are underlain by it. The Heidlersburg Member, in the middle of the formation, is "red, green, and gray shale and argillite and minor gray to white sandstone".

== Fossils ==
The palynomorph Froelichsporites traversei has been identified in the Gettysburg Formation. Indeterminate theropod remains similar to Coelophysis are also known from the Gettysburg Formation.

== Age ==
Relative age dating of the Gettysburg Formation places it in the Late Triassic period.

In 1977, B. Cornet dated a basalt flow near Aspers, Pennsylvania and led to his conclusion that the Gettysburg is of late Carnian and Norian to Early Jurassic age. Later, the rocks above the Aspers Basalt were redefined as the Bendersville Formation of Jurassic age.
