= Cline's Church of the United Brethren in Christ =

Historic church in Pennsylvania, United States

- U.S. National Register of Historic Places
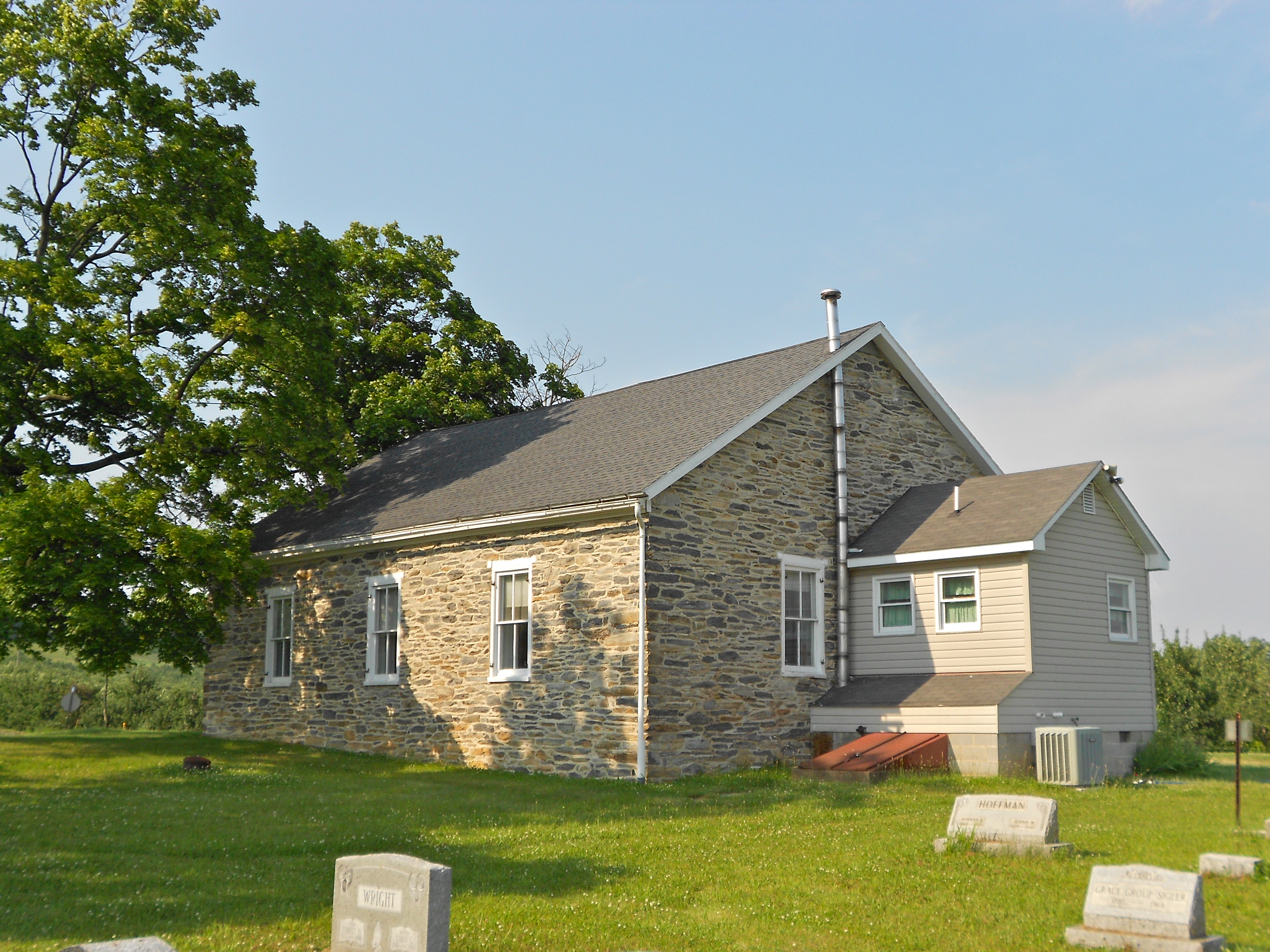

- Location within Pennsylvania Location within the United States
- Location: Cline's Church Road, 0.5 miles (0.80 km) south of Pennsylvania Route 34, near Menallen, Menallen Township, Pennsylvania
- Coordinates: 40°0′2″N 77°13′14″W
- Area: 1.4 acres (0.57 ha)
- Built: 1850
- Architectural style: Federal
- NRHP reference No.: 02000894
- Added to NRHP: August 22, 2002

Cline's Church of the United Brethren in Christ, also known as Cline's United Methodist Church, is a historic Brethren church on Cline's Church Road, 0.5 miles south of PA 34 at Menallen Township, Adams County, Pennsylvania, United States. It was built in 1850, and is a one-story, plain rectangular limestone building with a low gable roof. It measures 35 feet wide and 46 feet deep. The interior is a single room with white plastered walls and ceiling. Located adjacent to the church is the Cline's Cemetery, with grave markers dated from the mid-1800s to the present.

It was listed on the National Register of Historic Places in 2002.
