= Mount Guardian =

Mountain in New York, United States

- Location within New York Location within the United States

Highest point
- Elevation: 1,755 feet (535 m)
- Coordinates: 42°04′05″N 74°08′31″W

Geography
- Location: Wittenberg, New York, U.S.
- Topo map: USGS Bearsville

Mount Guardian is a mountain located in the Catskill Mountains of New York northeast of Wittenberg. Overlook Mountain is located northeast, and Ohayo Mountain is located south of Mount Guardian.
