= Tonshi Mountain =

Mountain in New York, United States

- Location within New York Location within the United States

Highest point
- Elevation: 1,995 feet (608 m)
- Coordinates: 42°00′03″N 74°11′34″W

Geography
- Location: Phoenicia, New York, U.S.
- Topo map: USGS Bearsville

Tonshi Mountain is a mountain located in the Catskill Mountains of New York southeast of Phoenicia. Acorn Hill is located northeast, Ohayo Mountain is located east-northeast, and Little Tonshi Mountain is located west-southwest of Tonshi Mountain.
