= Ohayo Mountain =

Mountain in New York, United States

- Location within New York Location within the United States

Highest point
- Elevation: 1,388 feet (423 m)
- Coordinates: 42°00′43″N 74°09′01″W

Geography
- Location: Wittenberg, New York, U.S.
- Topo map: USGS Bearsville

Ohayo Mountain is an American mountain located in the Catskill Mountains of New York southeast of Wittenberg. Acorn Hill is located northwest, Ashokan Ridge is located south, and Mount Guardian is located north of Ohayo Mountain.
