= Floradale, Pennsylvania =

Unincorporated community in Pennsylvania, US

Flora Dale, Pennsylvania
- unincorporated
- Location in Adams County and the state of Pennsylvania.
- Coordinates: 39°57′30″N 77°14′54″W
- Country: United States
- State: Pennsylvania
- County: Adams
- Township: Menallen

Area
  - Total: 0.062 sq mi (0.16 km^{2})
  - Land: 0.062 sq mi (0.16 km^{2})
  - Water: 0 sq mi (0.0 km^{2})
- Elevation: 633 ft (193 m)
  - Density: 635/sq mi (245.1/km^{2})
- Time zone: UTC-5 (Eastern (EST))
  - Summer (DST): UTC-4 (EDT)
- ZIP codes: 17307
- FIPS code: 42-26328
- GNIS feature ID: 1203599

Floradale is an unincorporated community in Menallen Township, Adams County, Pennsylvania, United States. The U.S. Census Bureau no longer recognizes Flora Dale as a census-designated place. It is located on Pennsylvania Route 34, 2 miles (3 km) north of Biglerville. The last updated census was in 2010, when the population was 38.

The post office was officially named, Flora Dale, 1861 to 1911, when it was briefly changed to Floradale, 1911 to 1926, then back to Flora Dale, 1926–1957. Contemporary newspapers used both spellings interchangeably throughout its history.

Flora Dale consists of a few houses along Pennsylvania Route 34, just north of Quaker Valley Road. The Flora Dale Post Office opened in 1861, with postmaster Elijah Wright and his wife Mary A. Wright serving until 1885. Three more postmasters, Amos G. Cook, Maria K. Cook, and Mary A. Hartman, served until 1919. The last two were sisters, Anna and Alice Black, serving until it closed in 1957. The community's only signage was its name on the post office which was removed when it closed, and since there has been no sign to tell others of its name. The community remains marked on most maps.

Just beyond the hamlet is the Menallen Township Society of Friends Meeting House. It is the second meeting house, a brick structure built in 1880 to replace the first one, built circa 1838. It is surrounded by large white oak trees, whose trunks are over 2 feet (0.61 m) thick. Behind the Meeting House is a covered stable where one could tie up the horses. There is a cemetery immediately south of the Meeting House.
