= Mill Mountain (Delaware County, New York) =

Mountain in New York, United States

- Location within New York Location within the United States

Highest point
- Elevation: 2,624 feet (800 m)
- Coordinates: 42°15′46″N 74°44′03″W

Geography
- Location: New Kingston, New York, U.S.
- Topo map: USGS Hobart

Mill Mountain is a mountain located in the Catskill Mountains of New York northwest of New Kingston. Mount Pisgah is located south of Mill Mountain and Burnt Hill is located east.
