= Mount Tobias =

Mountain in New York, United States

- Location within New York Location within the United States

Highest point
- Elevation: 2,543 feet (775 m)
- Coordinates: 42°03′30″N 74°12′57″W

Geography
- Location: Phoenicia, New York, U.S.
- Topo map: USGS Bearsville

Mount Tobias is a mountain located in the Catskill Mountains of New York southeast of Phoenicia. Ticetonyk Mountain is located south, Tremper Mountain is located northwest, Roundtop Mountain is located southeast, and Tonshi Mountain is located southeast of Mount Tobias.
