= Roundtop (York County, Pennsylvania) =

Coordinates: 40.103704°N 76.92553°W

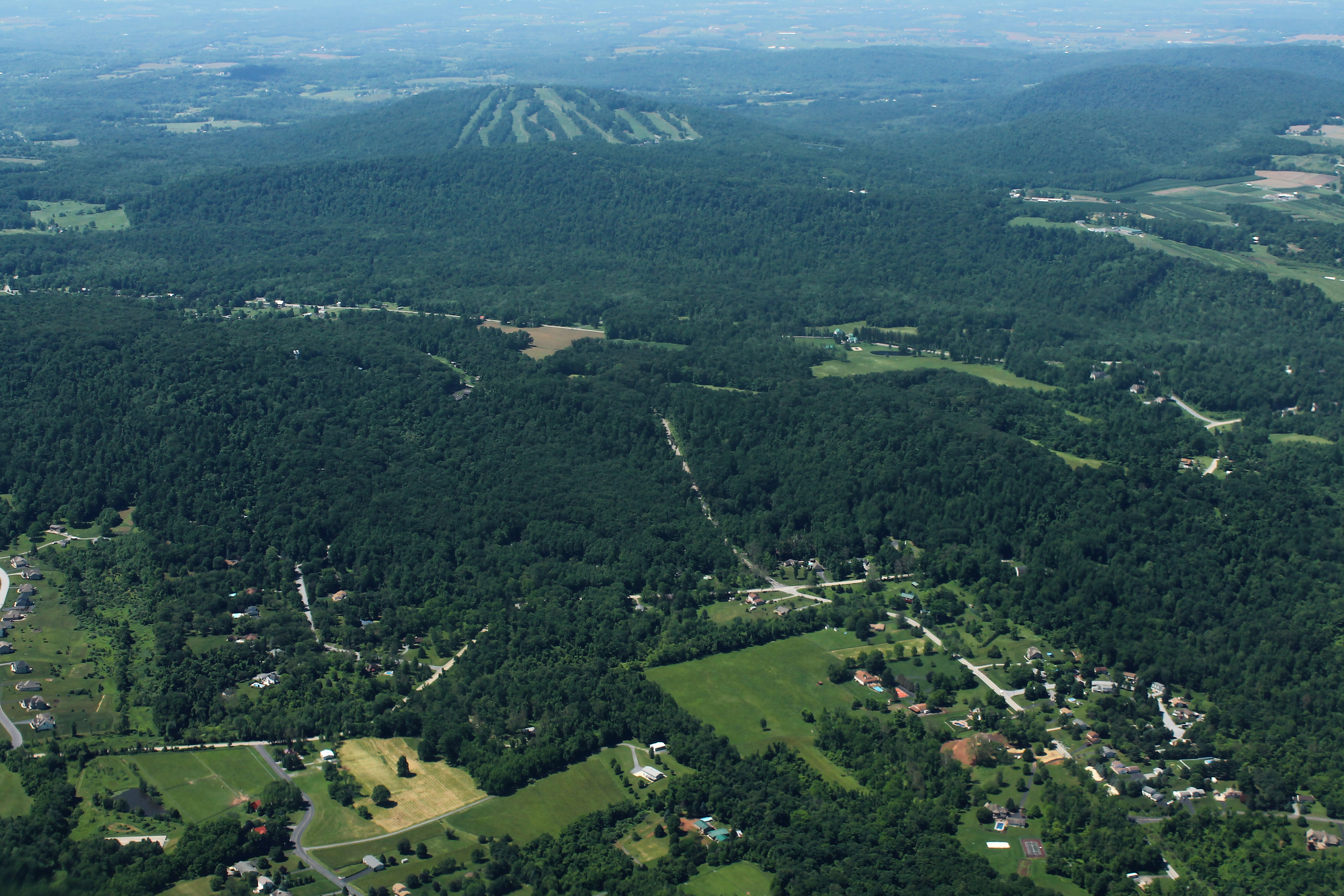
Aerial image of Roundtop Mountain, with the ski resort visible

Roundtop is a hill in northwestern York County, Pennsylvania, with a summit elevation of 1,316 feet (401 m). The resort Ski Roundtop is there.

== Geology ==
The mountain is underlain by the York Haven Diabase.
