= Roundtop Mountain (Ulster County, New York) =

Mountain in New York State, USA

- Location within New York Location within the United States

Highest point
- Elevation: 1,985 feet (605 m)
- Coordinates: 42°02′46″N 74°12′29″W

Geography
- Location: Wittenberg, New York, U.S.
- Topo map: USGS Bearsville

Roundtop Mountain is a mountain located in the Catskill Mountains of New York north-northwest of Wittenberg. Beetree Hill is located east-northeast, Johns Mountain is located east-northeast, and Mount Tobias is located north-northwest of Roundtop Mountain.
