= Hammer Creek Formation =

- Stratigraphic range: Late Triassic
- Type: Sedimentary
- Unit of: Newark Supergroup
- Overlies: New Oxford Formation
- Thickness: 9400 to 12200 feet

Lithology
- Primary: Sandstone, conglomerate
- Other: Shale

Location
- Extent: Pennsylvania

Type section
- Named for: Hammer Creek
- Named by: J. D. Glaeser, 1963

The Hammer Creek Formation is a mapped bedrock unit consisting primarily of conglomerate, coarse sandstone, and shale.

The Hammer Creek Formation was originally mapped as part of the Gettysburg Formation in Adams County, Pennsylvania in 1929. J. D. Glaeser renamed part of the Gettysburg to the Hammer Creek in 1963, to "avoid extending either the Gettysburg Formation from the west or the Brunswick Formation from the east to include rocks typical of neither unit."

A major groundwater resources study of the Hammer Creek Formation and other formations of the Newark Supergroup in Pennsylvania was published by Charles R. Wood in 1980.

== Depositional environment ==
The Hammer Creek Formation and other formations of the Newark Supergroup were deposited in the Newark Basin, just one of many Triassic rift basins existing on the east coast of North and South America, which formed as plate tectonics pulled apart Pangaea into the continents we see today.

== Stratigraphy ==
The Hammer Creek Formation is conformably underlain by the New Oxford Formation, which is the basal unit of the Newark Supergroup in south-central Pennsylvania. The Hammer Creek is mapped from the southern borders of Dauphin and Lebanon Counties to the northeast to the Schuylkill River. A laterally equivalent rock unit called the Brunswick Formation is mapped on the east side of the river and into New Jersey.

== Notable exposures ==
The type section is along Hammer Creek, Richland quadrangle, Lebanon County, Pennsylvania.

== Age ==
Relative age dating of the Hammer Creek Formation places it in the Late Triassic period.
