= Conewago Mountains =

Mountain range in Pennsylvania, US

Coordinates: 40.04670°N 76.85794°W

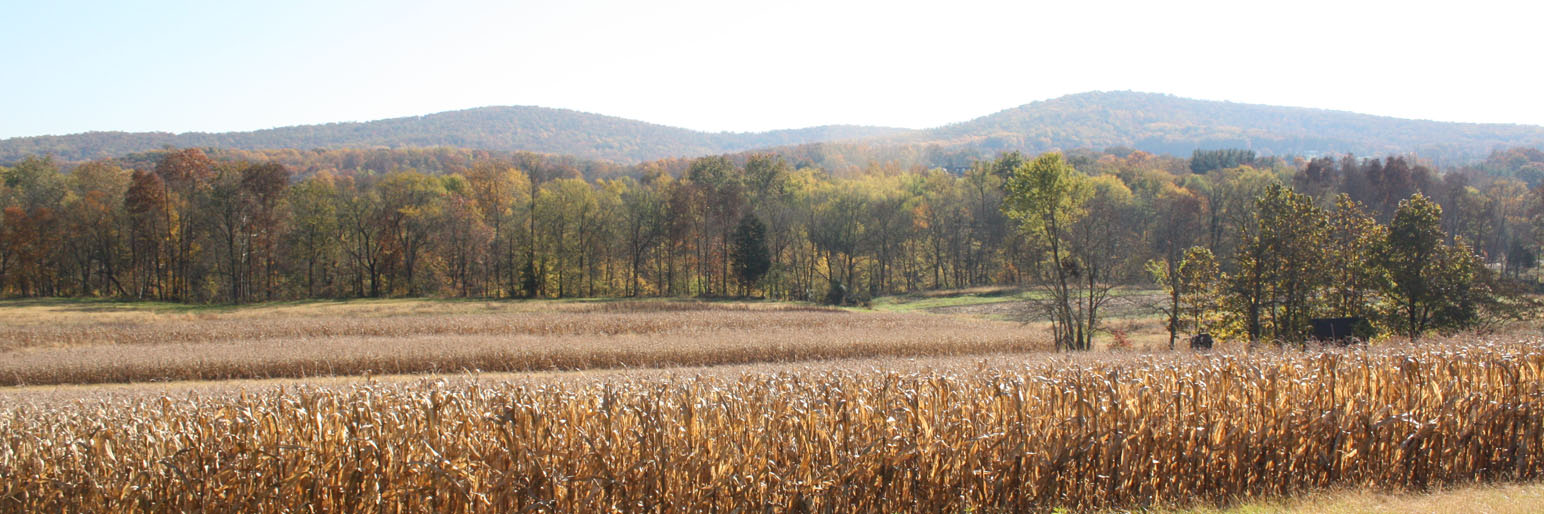
View of the Conewago Mountains facing southeast from Alpine Road

The Conewago Mountains or Conewago Hills are a low range of mountains in northern York County, Pennsylvania. They run northeasterly across the county. They form the backdrop to Gifford Pinchot State Park and parallel Conewago Creek.

The Conewago Mountains played a role in the early colonization and settling of the region, with settlers north of the mountains being predominantly Scotch-Irish and those south of the range being mostly Germans from the Palatinate region. The mountains provided a source of timber and firewood, and small iron foundries dotted the valley below to smelt iron ore taken from the Conewagos. During the American Civil War, Confederate cavalry under J.E.B. Stuart crossed over the mountains at the hamlet of Mount Royal in Dover Township en route from the Battle of Hanover to Carlisle. Scores of farms in the region were raided for horses, and many farmers hid their livestock in the Conewago Mountains to secret them from the passing Confederates.

Today, the mountains offer scenic views of York County and several fine homes and studios dot the hillsides.

== Geology ==
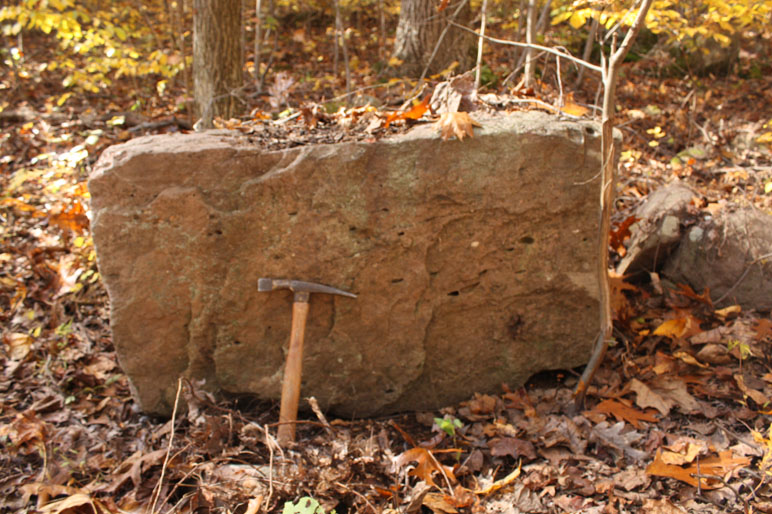
Boulder of the conglomerate along Crone Road near the top of one of the hills (rock hammer for scale)

The Conewago Mountains are underlain by Triassic conglomerate of the Gettysburg Formation.
