= New Oxford Formation =

- Stratigraphic range: Late Triassic, ~230–205.6 Ma
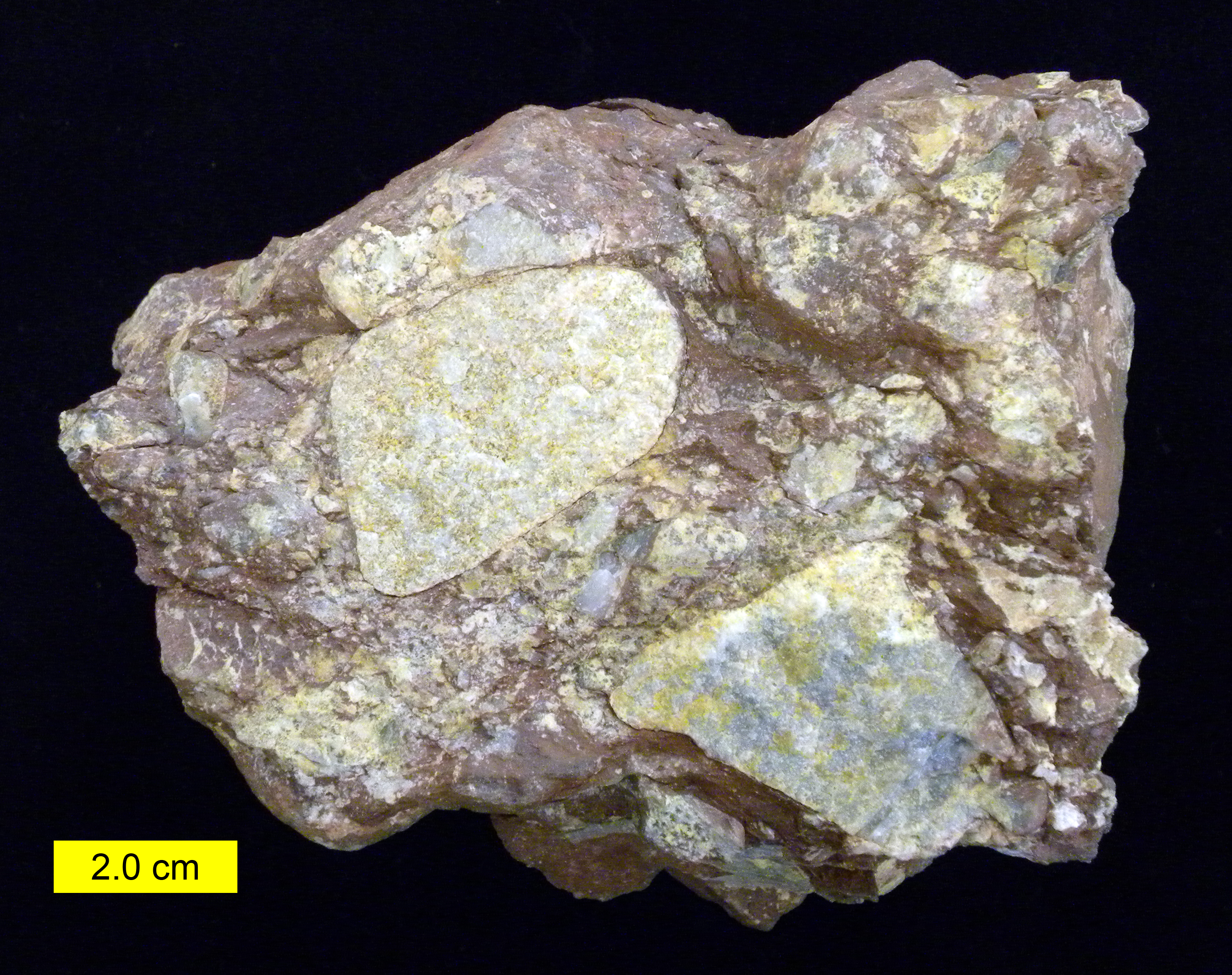
- Conglomerate of the New Oxford Formation from York County, Pennsylvania
- Type: sedimentary
- Unit of: Newark Supergroup
- Underlies: Gettysburg Formation
- Thickness: 6900 feet

Lithology
- Primary: shale, sandstone
- Other: conglomerate

Location
- Extent: Pennsylvania, Maryland

Type section
- Named by: Stose and Bascom, 1929

The New Oxford Formation is a mapped bedrock unit consisting primarily of sandstones, conglomerates, and shales. The New Oxford Formation was first described in Adams County, Pennsylvania in 1929, and over the following decade was mapped in adjacent York County, Pennsylvania and Frederick County, Maryland. It was described as "red shale and sandstone with beds of micaceous sandstone, arkose, and conglomerate." The majority of this early mapping was done by George Willis Stose, Anna Isabel Jonas, and Florence Bascom.

== Depositional Environment ==
The New Oxford Formation and other formations of the Newark Supergroup were deposited in the Gettysburg Basin, just one of many Triassic rift basins existing on the east coast of North and South America, which formed as plate tectonics pulled apart Pangaea into the continents we see today.

== Stratigraphy ==
The New Oxford Formation is overlain by the Gettysburg Formation in Frederick County, Maryland and in Adams, Cumberland, Lancaster, and York Counties in Pennsylvania. In all other areas to the northeast in Pennsylvania the New Oxford Formation is overlain by the Hammer Creek Formation.

The New Oxford Formation overlies precambrian and paleozoic rocks at the bottom of the Gettysburg Basin.

The New Oxford Formation is not divided into members.

== Paleofauna ==
=== Vertebrate paleofauna ===
The New Oxford Formation contains mainly tetrapod fossils, including dinosaur remains.

Vertebrate paleofauna of the New Oxford Formation
Genus	Species	Location	Stratigraphic position	Material	Notes	Images
Archosauria	Indeterminate			"Footprints"		
Anaschisma	A. browni			"Several partial specimens, including a well-preserved skull"	Initially referred to the now obsolete taxon Koskinonodon	
Anchisauripus	A. sillimani			"Footprints"	Possibly the same animal as Eubrontes	
Atreipus	A. milfordensis			"Footprints"		
Clepsysaurus	C. veatleianus			"Tooth"		
Compsosaurus	C. priscus			"Teeth"		
Galtonia	G. gibbidens			"Teeth."		
Grallator	G. tenuis			"Footprints"		
Metoposauridae	Indeterminate			?		
Otozoum	O. minus			"Footprints"		
Palaeoctonus	P. appalachianus			"Teeth"		
Palaeoctonus	P. aulacodus			"Teeth"		
Redondasaurus	Indeterminate			"Tooth"		
Rutiodon	R. carolinensis			"Holotype consists of five teeth, the vertebral centrum, vertebrae and ribs, the neural spine, and a fragment of interclavicle"		
Sauropodomorpha	Indeterminate (originally "Palaeosaurus" fraserianus)			"Tooth."	Originally known as Palaeosaurus fraserianus	
Sphodrosaurus	S. pennsylvanicus			"Partial skeleton including the back of the skull, the spinal column, all of the ribs, all of the hindlimbs and parts of the upper forelimbs"	Originally believed to have been a member of the Procolophonidae and then a dinosaur, it is now believed to be a basal member of the Eosuchia	
Suchoprion	S. cyphodon			"Teeth"		

=== Paleoflora ===
- Acrostichites linnaeaefolius
- Acrostichites microphyllus
- Anomozamites princeps
- Araucarites? pennsylvaninicus
- Araucarites yorkensis
- Asterocarpus falcatus
- Baiera muensteriana
- Brachyphyllum yorkense
- cf. Brachyphyllum cf. yorkense
- Cheirolepis muensteri
- Cladophlebis reticulata
- Conewagia longiloba
- Ctenophyllum grandifolium
- Ctenophyllum wannerianum
- Cycademyelon yorkense
- Cycadeospermum wanneri
- Dioonites carnallianus
- Equisetum rogersii
- Lonchopteris oblonga
- Macrotaeniopteris magnifolia
- Palissya diffusa
- Palissya sphenolepis
- Podozamites distans
- Pseudoddanaeopis plana
- Pterophyllum inaequale
- Sagenopteris sp.
- Schizolepis liaso-kueperinus
- Sphenozamites rogersianus
- Taeniopteris? yorkensis
- Thinnfeldia? reticulata
- Yorkia gramineoides
- Zamites pennsylvanicus
- Zamites yorkensis

== Age ==
Relative age dating of the New Oxford Formation places it in the Late Triassic period, around ~221.5–205.6 Ma (Norian-Rhaetian), possibly reaching as old as 230 Ma (Carnian) in some places.

== See also ==
- List of dinosaur-bearing rock formations
