= Ashokan Ridge =

Ridge in the Catskill Mountains, New York, US

- Location within New York Location within the United States

Highest point
- Elevation: 942 feet (287 m)
- Coordinates: 41°58′07″N 74°08′18″W

Geography
- Location: Stony Hollow, New York, U.S.
- Topo map: USGS Ashokan

Ashokan Ridge is a ridge located in the Catskill Mountains of New York west of Stony Hollow. Morgan Hill is located east, and Gallis Hill is located east-southeast of Ashokan Ridge.
