= York Haven Diabase =

Rock formation in Pennsylvania

- Stratigraphic range: Jurassic
- Type: Geologic Formation
- Underlies: Rossville Formation

Lithology
- Primary: Diabase
- Other: Ferrogabbro

Location
- Location: Pennsylvania
- Country: United States of America

Type section
- Named for: York County, PA

The York Haven Diabase is a rock formation in Pennsylvania, United States. It underlies the Rossville Diabase and is Jurassic in age. The formation is volcanic to subvolcanic, with a mafic composition and is categorized as a basalt. The York Haven Diabase is a member of the larger Gettysburg Basin. It plays an important role in United States history as the diabase outcrops were useful barriers in the union's strategy against the confederates at the Battle of Gettysburg.

== Formation ==
The York Haven Diabase began as one of many trough-like basins, which stretched from what is today northern New Jersey towards the northernmost tip of Virginia. These basins opened during the Mesozoic Era along the eastern continental margin of North America and created areas for sediments and lava flows to settle. These are inundated with intrusions, with all of them being primarily tholeiitic. The York Haven Diabase is considered to have a high titanium oxide (TiO_{2}) content and darker color, which differentiates it from the overlying Rossville Diabase which is considered to have a low titanium oxide content.

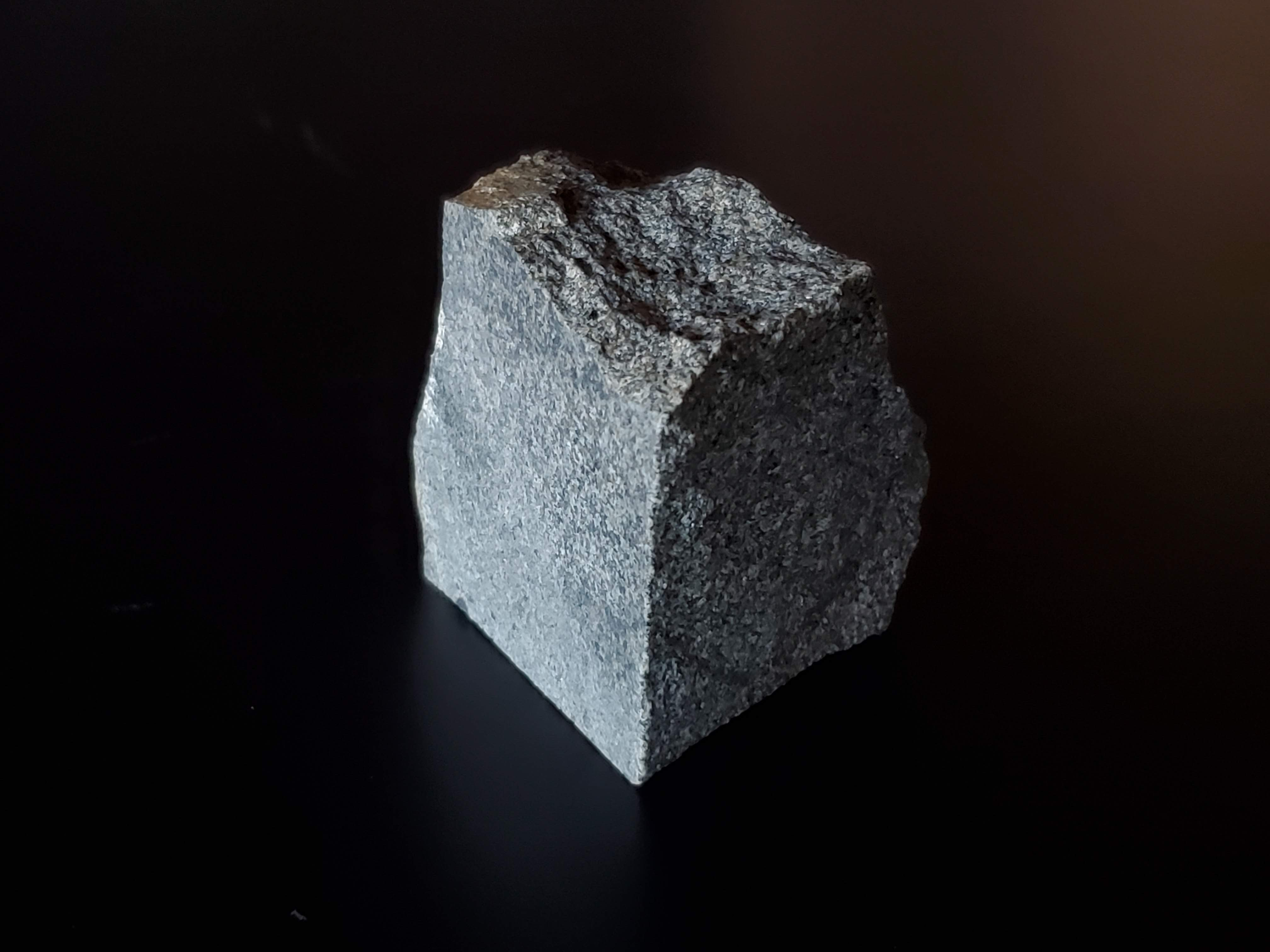
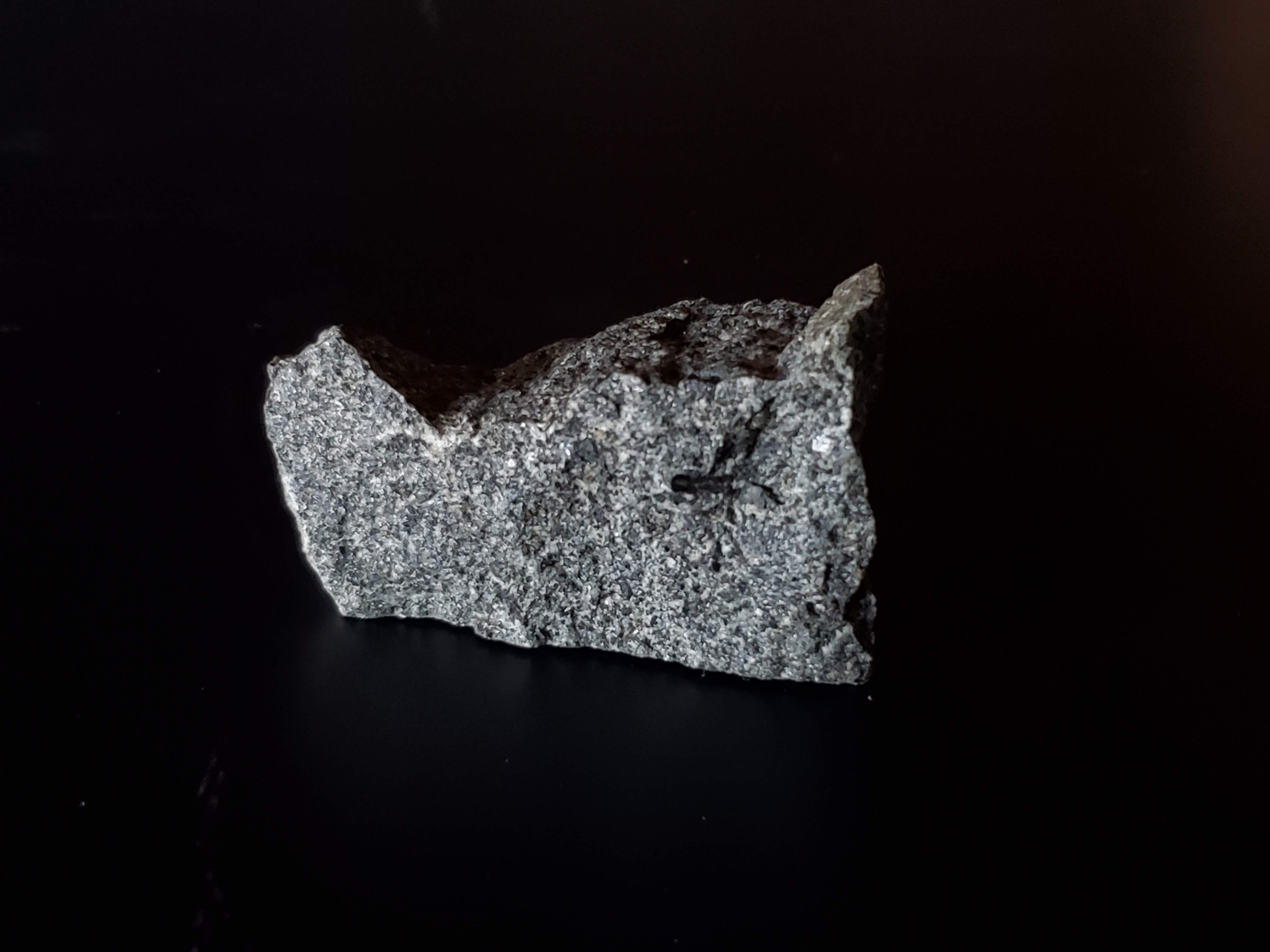
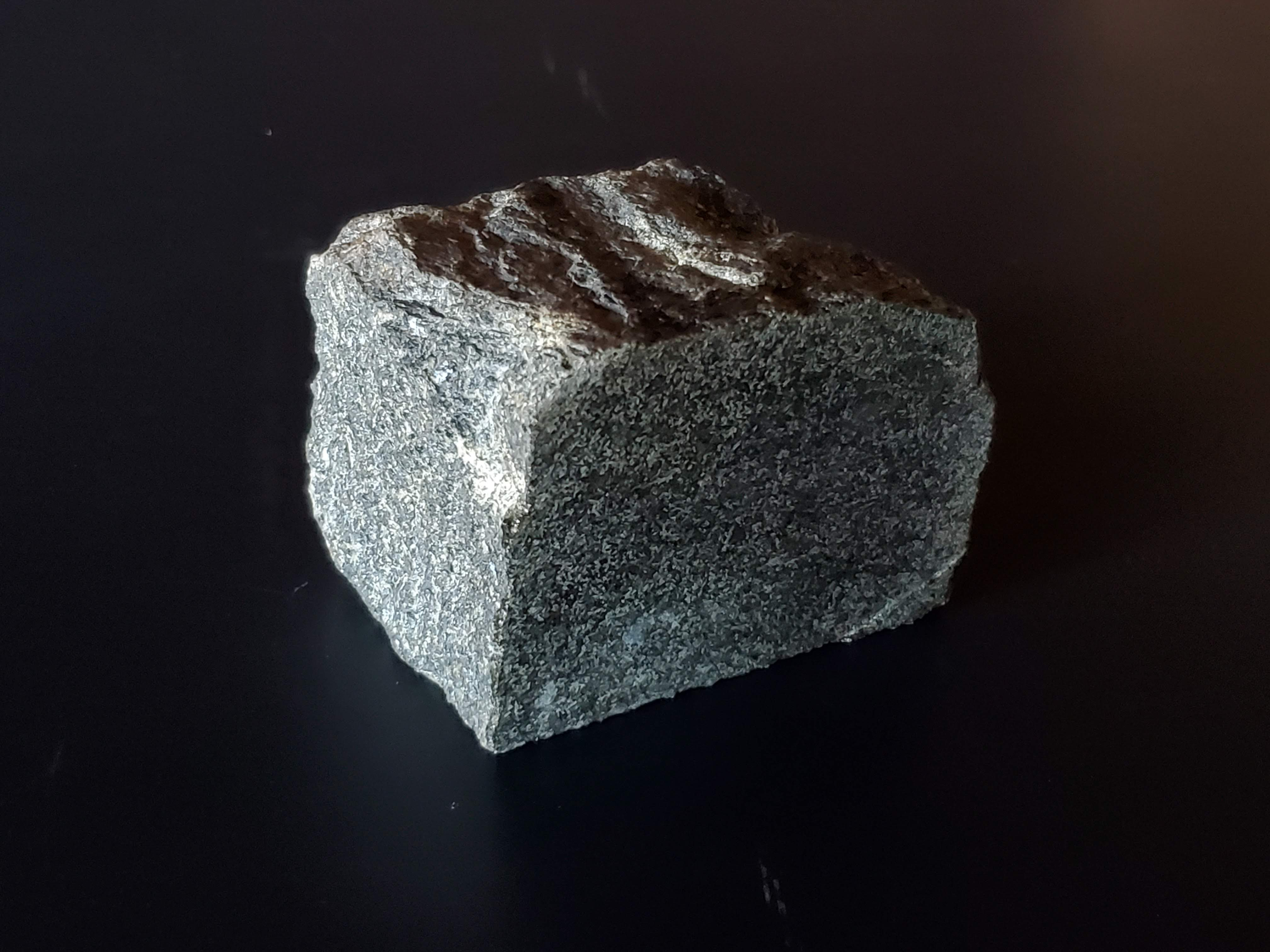
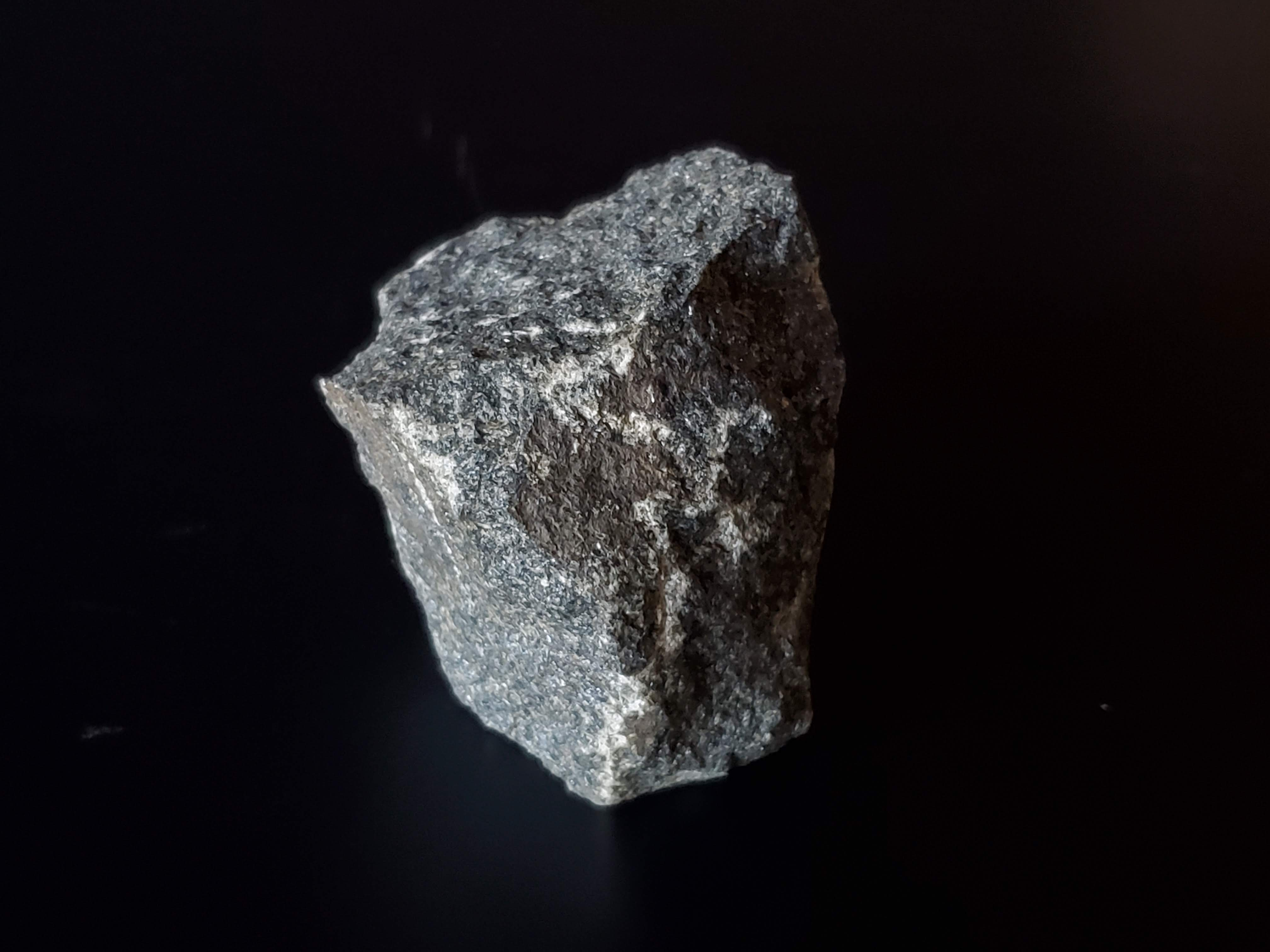
York Haven Diabase samples. Clockwise from upper left: Diabase, Diabase, Ferrogabbro, Low MgO Diabase.

The York Haven Diabase was previously thought to be Triassic in age, however a map published in 1980 by the Pennsylvania Geologic Survey provided evidence for the diabase to be Jurassic in age.

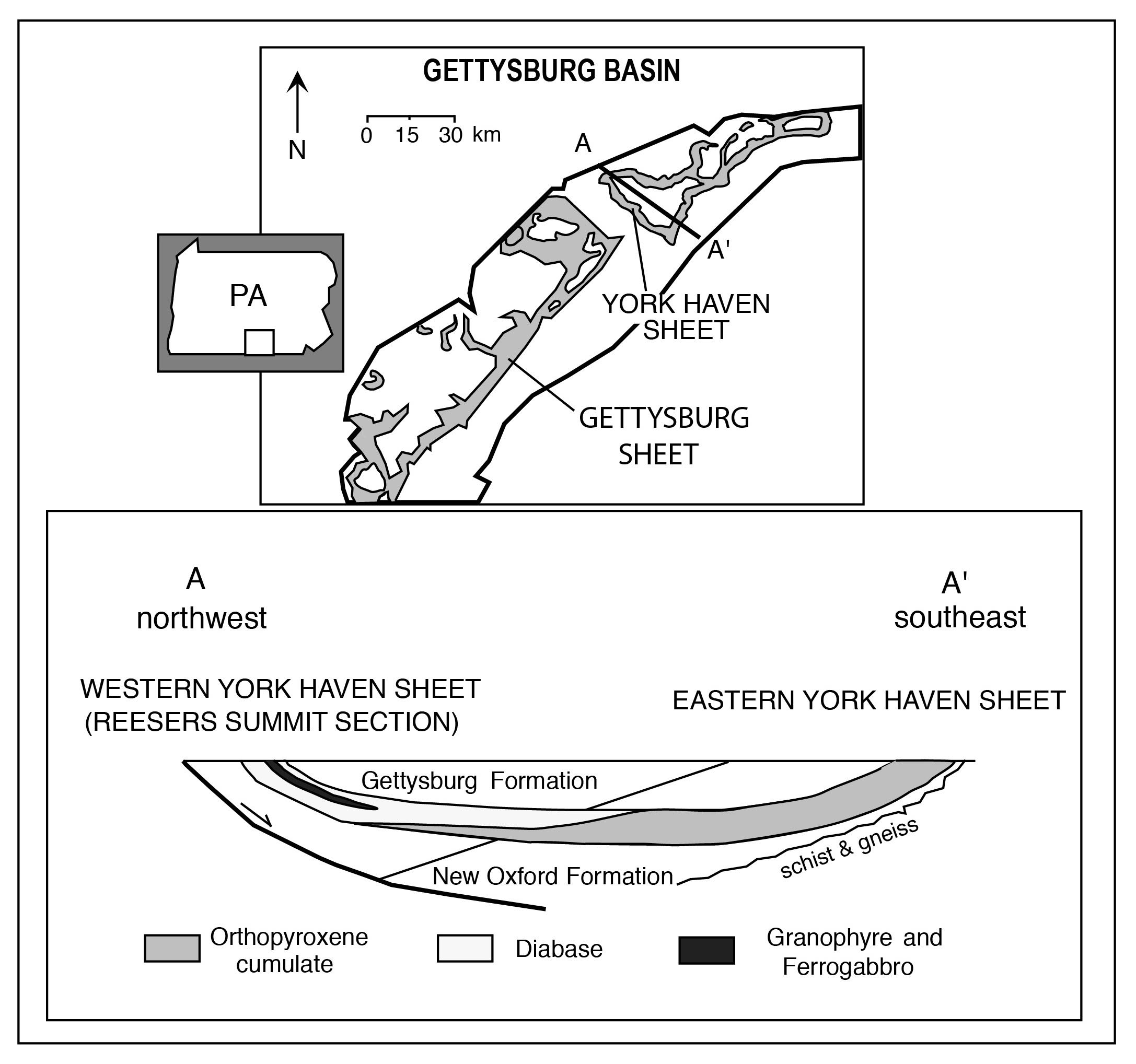
The York Haven Diabase is within the Gettysburg Basin

== Mineralogy ==
The York Haven Diabase contains diabase, as well as ferrogabbro.

The diabase is dark grey with white specs, and has a fine texture with crystals visible without magnification. The primary mineral present is clinopyroxene, with abundant plagioclase and k-feldspar, some ilmenite, and minor amounts of quartz.

The ferrogabbro is dark grey with white specs, as well as white veins extending multiple centimeters. It has a primary composition of amphibole and clinopyroxene, with abundant quartz and k-feldspar, some biotite, zircon, and apatite, and minor/trace amounts of chalcopyrite and galena.

== Range ==
The York Haven Diabase, named after York County, Pennsylvania, can be found across many counties. These counties include Adams, Berks, Buck, Chester, Cumberland, Dauphin, Lancaster, Lebanon, Lehigh, Montgomery, and as previously stated, York.

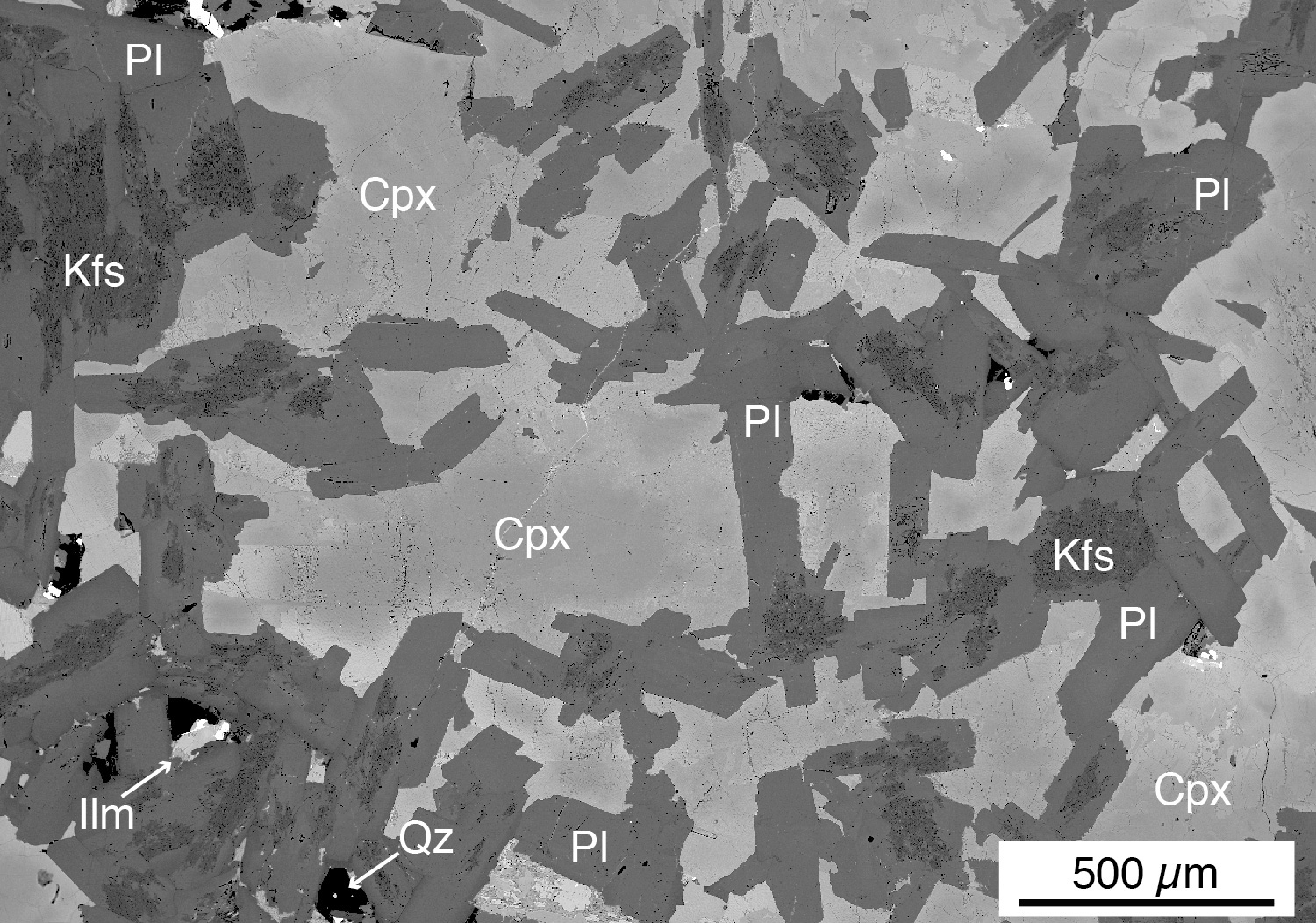
SEM image of Diabase (PYRS-84-3)

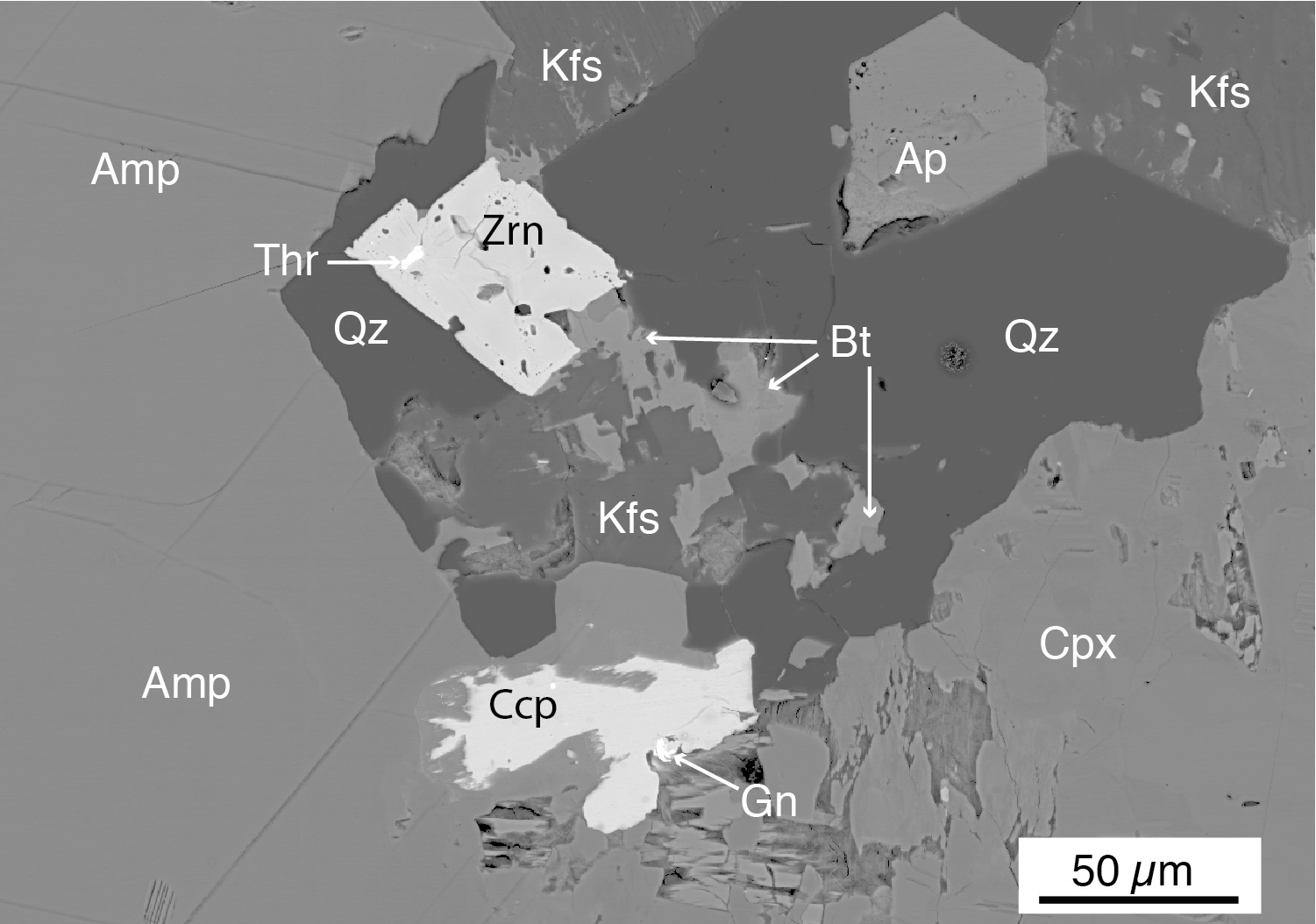
SEM image of Ferrogabbro (PYRS-84-8)

SEM images collected by the USGS. Abbreviations on minerals are defined as: Cpx = clinppyroxene, Pl = plagioclase, Kfs = K-feldspar, Ilm = ilmenite, Qz = quartz, Thr = thorite, Amp = amphibole, Mag = magnetite, Opx = orthopyroxene, Ap = apatite, Ccp = chalcopyrite, Gn = galena, Bt = biotite, Zrn = zircon.
