= Johns Mountain (New York) =

Mountain in the United States

- Location within New York Location within the United States

Highest point
- Elevation: 1,529 feet (466 m)
- Coordinates: 42°03′02″N 74°10′51″W

Geography
- Location: Wittenberg, New York, U.S.
- Topo map: USGS Bearsville

Johns Mountain is a mountain located in the Catskill Mountains of New York northeast of Wittenberg. Beetree Hill is located west, and Mount Tobias is located west-northwest of Johns Mountain.
