= Menallen Township, Adams County, Pennsylvania =

Township in Pennsylvania, US

Coordinates: 39°59′00″N 77°14′29″W

- Township
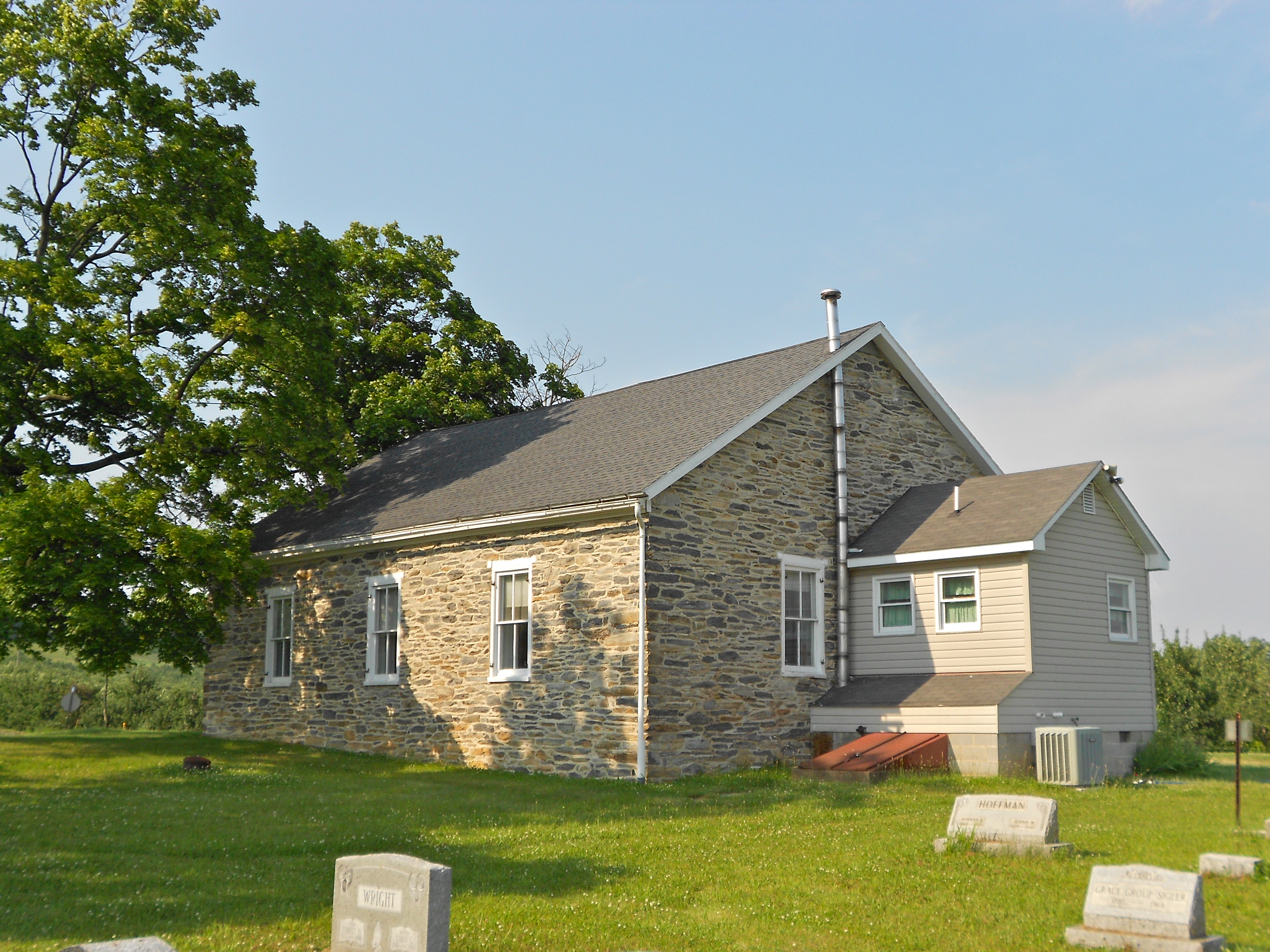
- Cline's Church of the United Brethren in Christ

- Location in Adams County and the state of Pennsylvania.
- Country: United States
- State: Pennsylvania
- County: Adams
- Settled: 1749
- Incorporated: 1749

Area
  - Total: 42.82 sq mi (110.90 km^{2})
  - Land: 42.70 sq mi (110.58 km^{2})
  - Water: 0.13 sq mi (0.33 km^{2})

Population (2020)
  - Total: 3,696
  - Estimate (2023): 3,766
  - Density: 82.7/sq mi (31.93/km^{2})
- Time zone: UTC-5 (Eastern (EST))
  - Summer (DST): UTC-4 (EDT)
- Area code: 717
- FIPS code: 42-001-48608

Menallen Township is a township that is located in Adams County, Pennsylvania, United States. The population was 3,515 at the time of the 2010 census.

This American township is named after an older variant spelling of Moyallen, County Down, now in Northern Ireland.

== Geography ==
According to the United States Census Bureau, the township has a total area of 42.8 square miles (110.9 km^{2}), of which 42.7 square miles (110.6 km^{2}) is land and 0.12 square miles (0.3 km^{2}), or 0.29%, is water. It contains the census-designated places of Aspers and Flora Dale.

== Demographics ==
Historical population
Census	Pop.	Note	%±
2000	2,974		—
2010	3,515		18.2%
2020	3,696		5.1%
2023 (est.)	3,766		1.9%
U.S. Decennial Census

As of the census of 2000, there were 2,974 people, 1,077 households, and 818 families residing in the township.

The population density was 69.5 inhabitants per square mile (26.8/km^{2}). There were 1,229 housing units at an average density of 28.7 per square mile (11.1/km^{2}).

The racial makeup of the township was 93.38% White, 0.91% African American, 0.20% Native American, 0.03% Asian, 0.03% Pacific Islander, 4.10% from other races, and 1.34% from two or more races. Hispanic or Latino of any race were 9.18% of the population.

There were 1,077 households, out of which 34.5% had children under the age of eighteen living with them; 64.3% were married couples living together, 7.2% had a female householder with no husband present, and 24.0% were non-families. 18.9% of all households were made up of individuals, and 7.2% had someone living alone who was sixty-five years of age or older.

The average household size was 2.73 and the average family size was 3.12.

Within the township, the population was spread out, with 26.2% of residents who were under the age of eighteen, 8.1% who were aged eighteen to twenty-four, 30.2% who were aged twenty-five to forty-four, 23.9% who were aged forty-five to sixty-four, and 11.5% who were sixty-five years of age or older. The median age was thirty-seven years.

For every one hundred females there were 104.8 males. For every one hundred females who were aged eighteen or older, there were 103.5 males.

The median income for a household in the township was $41,404, and the median income for a family was $43,615. Males had a median income of $30,786 compared with that of $23,523 for females.

The per capita income for the township was $17,415.

Approximately 7.3% of families and 8.4% of the population were living below the poverty line, including 8.7% of those who were under the age of eighteen and 15.8% of those who were aged sixty-five or older.
