= Aspers, Pennsylvania =

Unincorporated community in Pennsylvania, US

- Census-designated place
- Location in Adams County and the U.S. state of Pennsylvania.
- Coordinates: 39°58′47″N 77°13′34″W
- Country: United States
- State: Pennsylvania
- County: Adams
- Township: Menallen

Area
  - Total: 0.92 sq mi (2.38 km^{2})
  - Land: 0.90 sq mi (2.32 km^{2})
  - Water: 0.023 sq mi (0.06 km^{2})

Population (2020)
  - Total: 486
  - Density: 543.2/sq mi (209.74/km^{2})
- Time zone: UTC-5 (Eastern (EST))
  - Summer (DST): UTC-4 (EDT)
- FIPS code: 42-03312

Aspers is a census-designated place in Menallen Township, Adams County, Pennsylvania, United States. As of the 2020 census, it had a population of 486. At the 2000 census it was listed as the Bendersville Station-Aspers CDP.

== Geography ==
Aspers is located at 39°58′47″N 77°13′34″W (39.979613, -77.226122).

According to the United States Census Bureau, the community has a total area of 0.55 square miles (1.42 km^{2}), of which 0.53 square miles (1.36 km^{2}) is land and 0.037 miles (0.06 km), or 4.40%, is water.

== Demographics ==
Historical population
Census	Pop.	Note	%±
2010	350		—
2020	486		38.9%
U.S. Decennial Census

As of the census of 2000, there were 324 people, 108 households, and 81 families residing in the community. The population density was 643.3 inhabitants per square mile (248.4/km^{2}). There were 113 housing units at an average density of 224.4 per square mile (86.6/km^{2}). The racial makeup of the community was 78.40% White, 4.32% African American, 14.81% from other races, and 2.47% from two or more races. Hispanic or Latino of any race were 23.77% of the population.

There were 108 households, out of which 31.5% had children under the age of 18 living with them, 54.6% were married couples living together, 16.7% had a female householder with no husband present, and 24.1% were non-families. 17.6% of all households were made up of individuals, and 11.1% had someone living alone who was 65 years of age or older. The average household size was 3.00 and the average family size was 3.39.

The population was spread out, with 28.4% under the age of 18, 12.7% from 18 to 24, 29.0% from 25 to 44, 18.2% from 45 to 64, and 11.7% who were 65 years of age or older. The median age was 33 years. For every 100 females, there were 96.4 males. For every 100 females age 18 and over, there were 85.6 males.

The median income for a household in the community was $44,167, and the median income for a family was $41,042. Males had a median income of $20,625 versus $28,542 for females. The per capita income for the community was $16,821. About 13.6% of families and 10.7% of the population were below the poverty line, including 13.9% of those under age 18 and 14.6% of those age 65 or over.

== Geology ==
The area surrounding the community is underlain by the Triassic sedimentary rocks of the Gettysburg Formation. Generally, conglomerate is present on the north side of town and shale is present to the south. Also, a basalt flow intrudes through the Gettysburg Formation near the town.

== Education ==
It is in the Upper Adams School District.
