= Beetree Hill =

Mountain in New York, United States

- Location within New York Location within the United States

Highest point
- Elevation: 1,821 feet (555 m)
- Coordinates: 42°03′02″N 74°11′18″W

Geography
- Location: Wittenberg, New York, U.S.
- Topo map: USGS Bearsville

Beetree Hill is a mountain located in the Catskill Mountains of New York north-northeast of Wittenberg. Johns Mountain is located east, and Acorn Hill is located south-southeast of Beetree Hill.
