= Acorn Hill =

Mountain in the United States

- Location within New York Location within the United States

Highest point
- Elevation: 1,306 feet (398 m)
- Coordinates: 42°01′49″N 74°10′24″W

Geography
- Location: Wittenberg, New York, U.S.
- Topo map: USGS Bearsville

Acorn Hill is a mountain located in the Catskill Mountains of New York northeast of Wittenberg. Snake Rocks is located southeast, and Johns Mountain is located north-northeast of Acorn Hill.
