= Round Top Mountain =

Mountain in Texas, United States

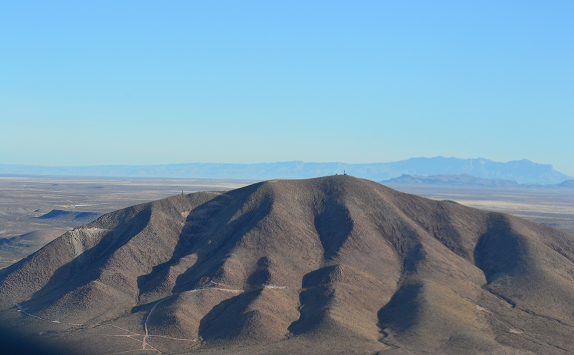
- Aerial view of Round Top Mountain in Texas

Highest point
- Elevation: 5,732 ft (1,747 m)
- Coordinates: Texas location map.svg_scale:100000 31°16′36″N 105°28′27″W

Geography
- Location within Texas
- Location: Hudspeth County, Texas, United States
- Topo map: USGS Round Top Mountain

Round Top Mountain is a mountain located at the western end of the Sierra Blanca area in Hudspeth County, Texas near the town of Sierra Blanca. The area includes the Finlay Mountains, Triple Hill, and Sierra Blanca quadrangles as well as parts of the Fort Quitman and McNary quadrangles. Round Top Mountain is known for containing deposits of beryllium as well as the largest deposit of heavy rare-earth elements in the United States.

== Geography ==
Round Top Mountain is located in the Trans-Pecos region of West Texas, northeast from the Mexican border. The region is the most mountainous area of Texas, and lies to the southeast of the Sierra Blanca mountain range. The area includes the Finlay Mountains, Triple Hill, and Sierra Blanca quadrangles as well as parts of the Fort Quitman and McNary quadrangles. The Sierra Blanca area is approximately 950 square miles (2,500 km^{2}). Round Top Mountain is one of five peaks made from laccoliths in the area, with the others being Little Round Top, Little Blanca, Triple Hill, and Sierra Blanca. The area lies between the northern Quitman Mountains and Devils Ridge.

The closest town to Round Top Mountain is Sierra Blanca, Texas, located 8 miles (13 km) southeast of the mountain with a population of approximately 553 people. It is accessible by Interstate 10 and approximately 85 miles (137 km) east of El Paso, Texas.

Round Top Mountain is more than a mile in diameter at its base (approximately 1,609 meters). Its peak is 1,000 feet (300 m) above the desert plateau and approximately 4,270 to 4,600 feet (1,300 to 1,400 m) above sea level.

== Geology ==
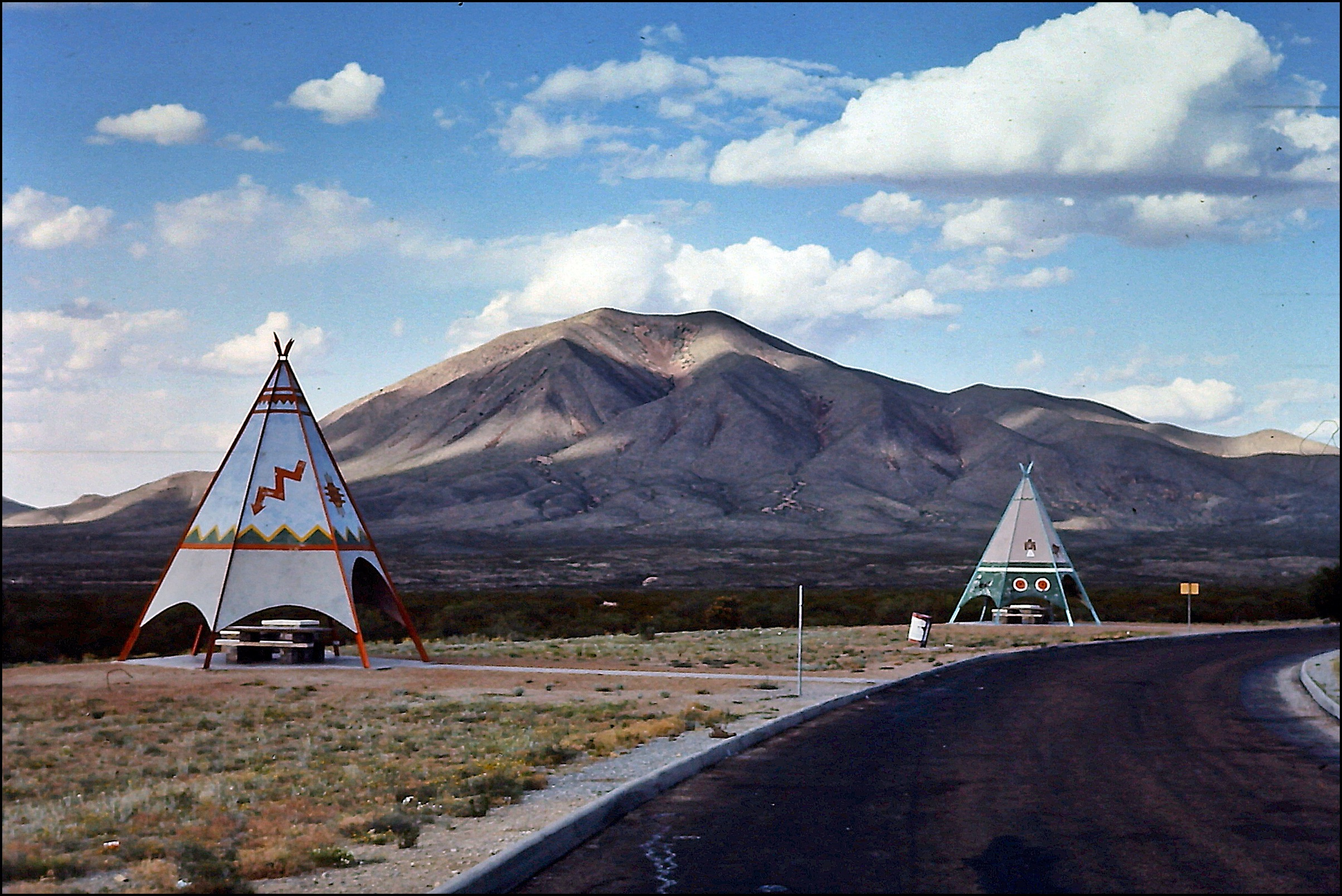
Sierra Blanca Mountains viewable from Texas along Interstate 10

The Sierra Blanca area is on the northern margin of the Chihuahua Tectonic Belt and is a massive complex of volcanic rocks including pyroclastic materials, lava flows, and intrusions. Round Top Mountain is a surface-exposed rhyolite intrusion that was created from molten liquid rock pushing up from beneath the earth's surface. The top layer of sedimentary rock that makes up the mountain has been eroded over time, exposing the rhyolite formation. It also contains quantities of Del Rio Clay and Finlay limestone as well as deposits of uranium and lithium. The area contains scrub brush and grasses that are supported by the mountain's sandy loams and clay.

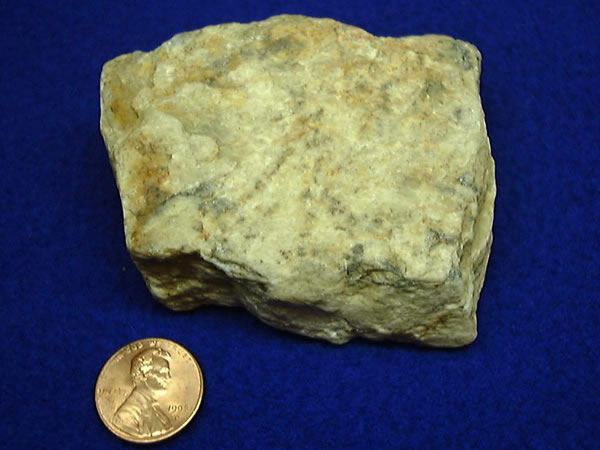
Berryllim ore, commonly found in Round Top with most concentrations on the northwest corner of the mountain

The first geological exploration in the area of Round Top Mountain was in the 1970s when fluoride deposits were discovered. Holes were drilled along with prospective trenches in Round Top Mountain, Little Blanca Mountain, and Little Round Top Mountain between 1971 and 1980. The 1980s led to the discovery of deposits of beryllium that are concentrated on the northwest corner of Round Top Mountain. Throughout the 1980s, several companies held interest in the mountain, including the Cabot Corporation and the Cypus Metals Company. A 1988 feasibility study found the mountain to contain approximately 298,000 tons of ore with a prediction of yielding 11,000,000 lbs of beryllium.

Round Top is known for containing rare-earth elements, including the largest deposit of heavy rare-earth elements in the United States, estimated at over 1 billion tons. The rare-earth elements contained in the mountain can be used to build energy and defense applications as well as electronic devices, lasers, in oil and gas drilling, water treatment, and other uses. The deposit in the mountain includes five light and 10 heavy rare-earth elements. The heavy rare-earth mineralization at Round Top is unique, with these elements hosted in yttrofluorite, a variety of the mineral fluorite. No similar deposit has been described elsewhere.

=== Round Top Project ===
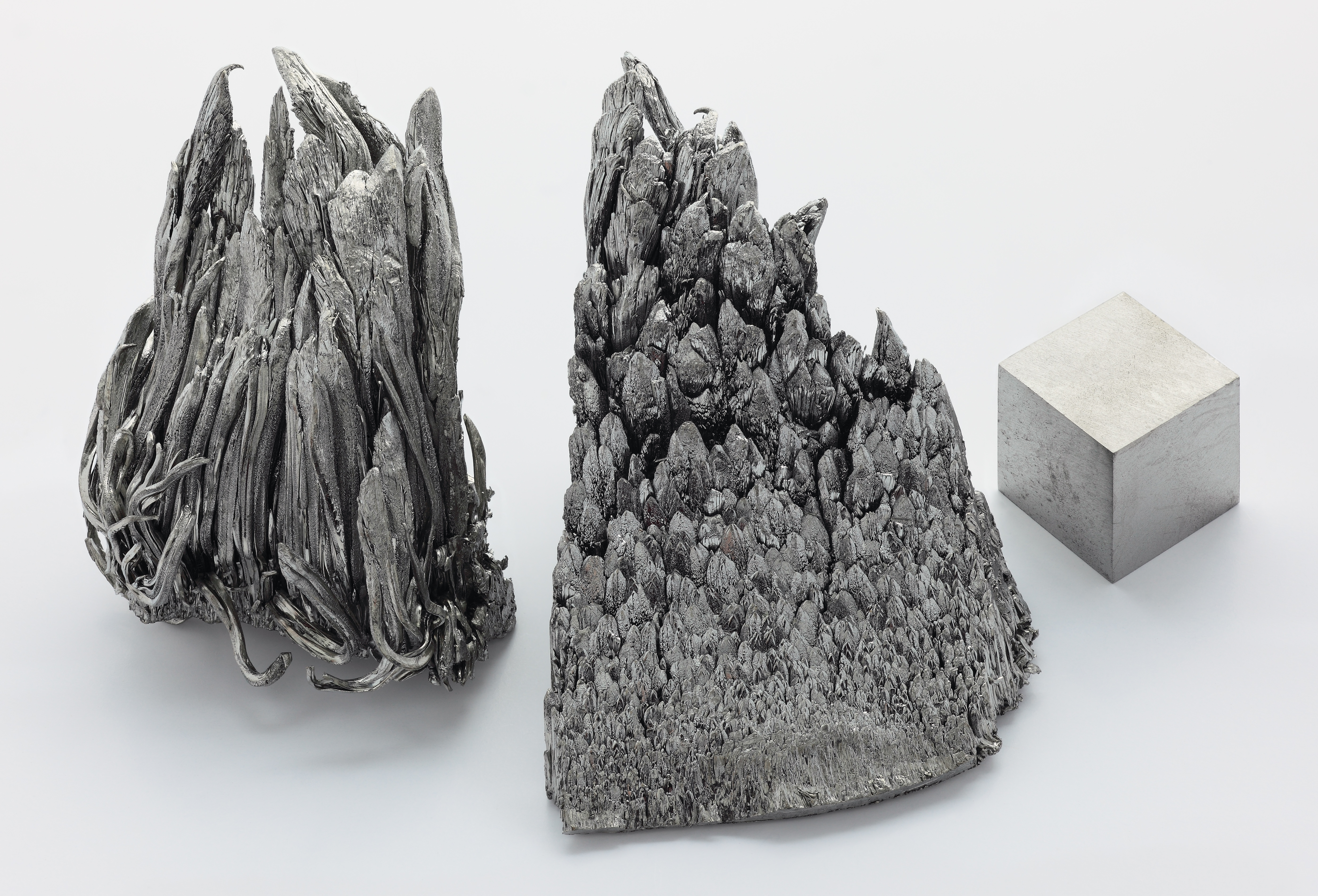
Yttrium, one of the rare-earth elements located in Round Top Mountain

The Round Top Project is a joint venture of USA Rare Earth and Texas Mineral Resources Corporation (TMRC; formerly Texas Rare Earth Resources). Round Top hosts 16 of the 17 rare earths, as well as industrial minerals including lithium, beryllium, and uranium. In addition to the rare earths and scandium, the Round Top project contains 11 of the 35 non-rare earth minerals deemed "critical to U.S. national security and the economy" by the U.S. Department of the Interior.

While the site is owned by the Texas General Land Office, it was leased to Texas Rare Earth Resources beginning in May 2011 for the exploration and development of the site's rare-earth elements. The United States was the leading producer of rare-earth elements until the 1990s when lower production costs in China caused other mines to close down. China began restricting exports of rare-earth elements in 2006, causing a substantial rise in the cost of the elements. China's monopoly on these elements led to the exploration for rare-earth elements in the United States, including opening of previously closed mines.

The Round Top Project began in the 1980s with the drilling of several locations in the mountain for fluoride and later beryllium. The project was originally for the exploration and development of beryllium and uranium, both of which are found in the mountain. Texas Rare Earth Resources picked up the project in 2011 with the re-logging and re-analyzing of the previous 82,000 feet (approximately 24,993 meters) of drilling. A 1990 study by the Texas Bureau of Geology estimated the rare-earth deposits in the mountain to be 1.6 billion metric tonnes. The project also has TREE+Y (Total Rare Earth Elements plus Yttrium) content of 80 million tons. The Round Top Project plans to extract the heavy rare-earth elements through an open-pit mine, crushing the ore and using a heap leaching process to extract the elements. The project cost is approximately $290 million with an estimated $8 billion in projected revenue over 20 years of mining.

The heavy rare-earth elements are hosted in yttrofluorite which is soluble in dilute sulfuric acid, making heap leach extraction feasible. The natural porosity and permeability of the rhyolite provide the micro-conduits that allow the acid to penetrate to the interior of the large crush size (one inch, or 2.5 cm) for the heap leach. The even grade of heavy rare-earth mineralization throughout the deposit leads to a consistent, unchanging quality of raw material for the heap leach.

==== Defense Logistics Agency Grant Project ====
In September 2015, the U.S. Department of Defense, through the Defense Logistics Agency (DLA), awarded TMRC a Broad Agency Announcement (BAA) research contract. In July 2016 TMRC announced it had successfully completed a demonstration-of-concept project using Round Top ore as feedstock to separate and refine specific high-purity rare earth elements for the DLA Strategic Materials Division in conjunction with its joint venture partner K-Technologies, Inc. (K-Tech). In the bench scale demonstration, Texas Mineral Resources Corp. and K-Tech successfully separated specified high-value rare earths to between 99.996 and 99.999% purity, using static column systems designed to provide the general design concepts for ultimate use of continuous ion exchange (CIX) and continuous ion chromatography (CIC) systems at larger scales.

==== Expanded preliminary economic assessment ====
TMRC and its funding and development partner USA Rare Earth, LLC announced completion of an expanded and updated NI 43-101 Preliminary Economic Assessment (PEA) on the Round Top Project on August 20, 2019.

The PEA reports a net present value (NPV) for the project of $1.56 Billion (at a 10% discount rate, pre-tax), an internal rate of return (IRR) of 70%, and a payback period of 1.4 years. Capital cost for the project is $350.4 million, including a complete on-site rare earth oxide and mineral separation plant, and includes a 25% contingency provision of $65.7 million.

== Environment ==
Ground water near Round Top Mountain is available through natural underground reservoirs. However, the water is too brackish and mineral-laden to be potable. The rainfall in the area comes primarily from thunderstorms during the months of July and August, with the months of January through April being mostly dry. Temperatures during the summer months reach 100 °F during the day with cooler temperatures at night. Due to the breezes in the higher parts of the mountain the actual temperature can vary considerably in the area. Round Top Mountain is a low impact for earthquakes with approximately one occurrence every 50 years.

=== Climate ===
Climate data for Round Top Mountain (Sierra Blanca, Texas)
Month	Jan	Feb	Mar	Apr	May	Jun	Jul	Aug	Sep	Oct	Nov	Dec	Year
Mean daily maximum °F (°C)	58 (14)	63 (17)	69 (21)	78 (26)	87 (31)	94 (34)	92 (33)	90 (32)	87 (31)	78 (26)	67 (19)	58 (14)	77 (25)
Mean daily minimum °F (°C)	26 (−3)	29 (−2)	35 (2)	43 (6)	52 (11)	61 (16)	64 (18)	62 (17)	56 (13)	44 (7)	33 (1)	26 (−3)	44 (7)
Average precipitation inches (mm)	0.40 (10)	0.68 (17)	0.30 (7.6)	0.33 (8.4)	0.52 (13)	1.13 (29)	2.13 (54)	2.15 (55)	1.45 (37)	1.15 (29)	0.41 (10)	0 (0)	11.27 (286)

== See also ==
- Extractive metallurgy
- List of mountain peaks of Texas
- Shield volcano
- Sierra Blanca (New Mexico)
- Underground mining (hard rock)
