= New Kingston, New York =

Hamlet in Delaware County

- Hamlet
- Location within New York Location within the United States
- Coordinates: 42°12′49″N 74°40′56″W
- Country: United States
- State: New York
- County: Delaware
- Elevation: 1,686 ft (514 m)
- Time zone: UTC−05:00 (EST)
  - Summer (DST): UTC−04:00 (EDT)
- ZIP Code: 12459
- Area code(s): 845
- GNIS feature ID: 958426

New Kingston is a hamlet in Delaware County, New York, United States. The community is 4.8 miles (7.7 km) north-northwest of Margaretville. New Kingston has a post office with ZIP Code 12459, which opened on September 7, 1840.
