= John Carpenter filmography =

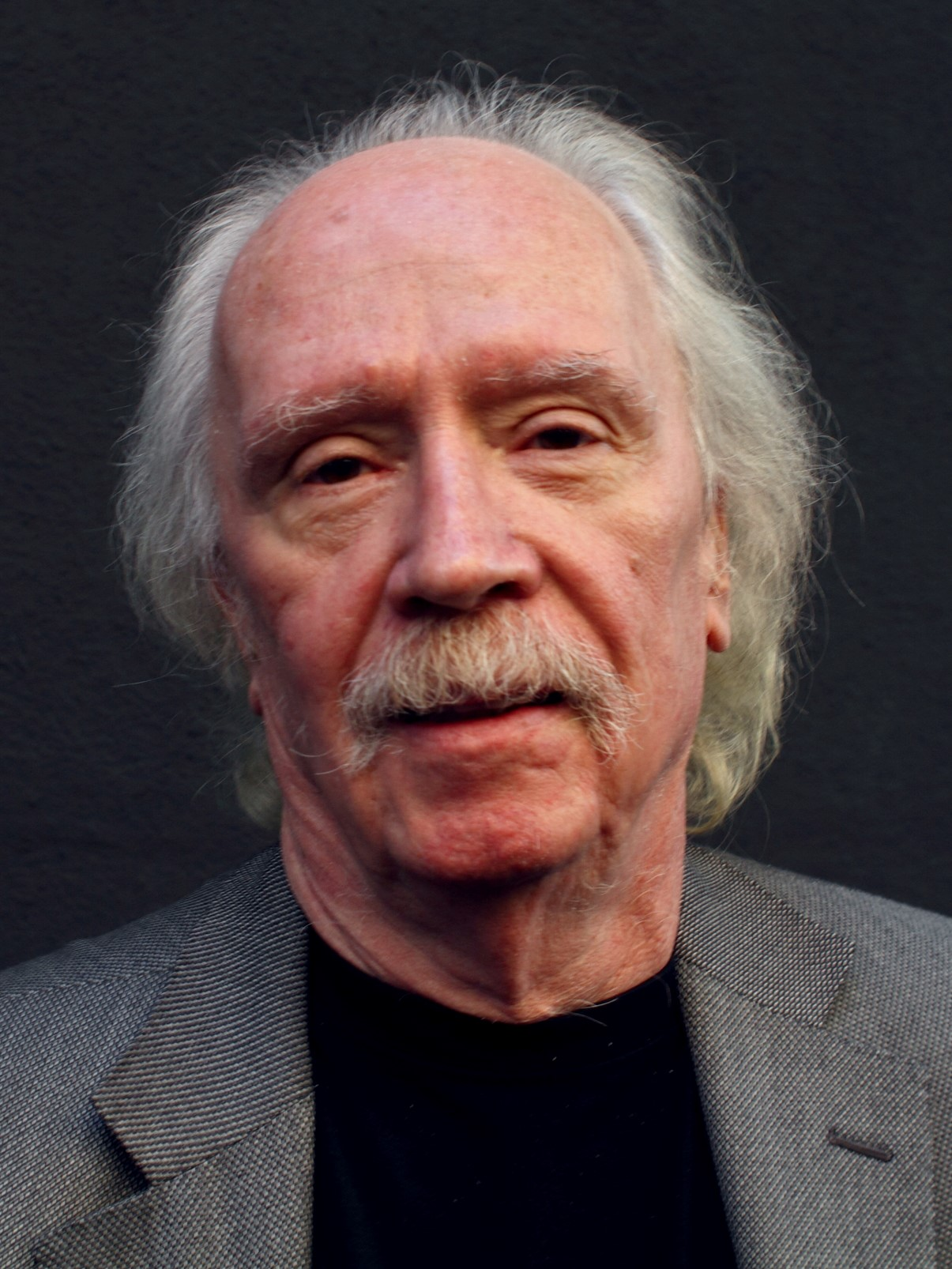
John Carpenter in 2010

John Carpenter is an American film director, producer, writer and composer. He has contributed to many projects as either the producer, writer, director, actor, composer or a combination of the five.

== Films ==
=== Feature films ===
Year	Title	Credited as				Notes	Ref(s)
Year	Title	Director	Writer	Producer	Composer	Notes	Ref(s)
1974	Dark Star	Yes	Yes	Yes	Yes	Co-Written with Dan O'Bannon	
1976	Assault on Precinct 13	Yes	Yes	No	Yes	Also editor	
1978	Halloween	Yes	Yes	Uncredited	Yes	Co-Written with Debra Hill	
1978	Someone's Watching Me!	Yes	Yes	No	No	Television film	
1979	Elvis	Yes	No	No	No	Television film	
1980	The Fog	Yes	Yes	No	Yes	Co-written with Debra Hill	
1981	Escape from New York	Yes	Yes	No	Yes	Co-written with Nick Castle	
1982	The Thing	Yes	No	No	No		
1983	Christine	Yes	No	No	Yes		
1984	Starman	Yes	No	No	No		
1986	Big Trouble in Little China	Yes	No	No	Yes		
1987	Prince of Darkness	Yes	Yes	No	Yes		
1988	They Live	Yes	Yes	No	Yes		
1992	Memoirs of an Invisible Man	Yes	No	No	No		
1993	Body Bags	Yes	No	Executive	Yes	Television film	
1994	In the Mouth of Madness	Yes	No	No	Yes		
1995	Village of the Damned	Yes	No	No	Yes		
1996	Escape from L.A.	Yes	Yes	No	Yes	Co-written with Debra Hill & Kurt Russell	
1998	Vampires	Yes	No	No	Yes		
2001	Ghosts of Mars	Yes	Yes	No	Yes	Co-written with Larry Sulkis	
2010	The Ward	Yes	No	No	No		

=== Other credits ===
Year	Title	Credited as				Notes	Ref(s)
Year	Title	Writer	Producer	Composer	Editor	Notes	Ref(s)
1973	Last Foxtrot in Burbank	No	No	No	Yes	Notes	Ref(s)
1978	Eyes of Laura Mars	Yes	No	No	No	Notes	Ref(s)
1978	Zuma Beach	Yes	No	No	No	Television film	
1979	Better Late Than Never	Yes	No	No	No	Television film	
1981	Halloween II	Yes	Yes	Yes	No	Co-written with Debra Hill; Also uncredited director of additional scenes	
1982	Halloween III: Season of the Witch	No	Yes	Yes	No		
1984	The Philadelphia Experiment	No	Executive	No	No		
1986	Black Moon Rising	Yes	Executive	No	No		
1990	El Diablo	Yes	Executive	No	No	Television film	
1991	Blood River	Yes	No	No	No	Television film	
1999	Silent Predators	Yes	No	No	No	Television film	
2002	Vampires: Los Muertos	No	Executive	No	No		
2005	The Fog	No	Yes	No	No		
2017	The Terror of Hallow's Eve	No	No	Yes	No		
2018	Halloween	No	Executive	Yes	No		
2021	Halloween Kills	No	Executive	Yes	No		
2022	Studio 666	No	No	Yes	No	Opening credits theme only	
2022	Firestarter	No	No	Yes	No		
2022	Halloween Ends	No	Executive	Yes	No		

=== Short films ===
Year	Title	Director	Writer	Composer	Notes	Ref(s)
1969	Captain Voyeur	Yes	Yes	No	Also producer	
1970	The Resurrection of Broncho Billy	No	Yes	Yes	Also editor	
2016	The Puppet Man	No	No	Yes		

=== Acting roles ===
Year	Title	Role	Notes	Ref(s)
1974	Dark Star	Talby voice		
1976	Assault on Precinct 13	Gang Member	Uncredited	
1978	Halloween	Paul (Annie's boyfriend) / Michael Myers	Uncredited	
1980	The Fog	Bennett	Uncredited	
1981	Escape from New York	Secret Service #2, helicopter pilot, and a violin player	Uncredited	
1982	The Thing	Norwegian in video footage	Uncredited	
1984	Starman	Man in helicopter	Uncredited	
1986	Big Trouble in Little China	Worker in Chinatown	Uncredited	
1986	The Boy Who Could Fly	Coupe de Villes band member	Uncredited	
1988	They Live	Voice that says 'sleep'	Uncredited voice role	
1992	Memoirs of an Invisible Man	Helicopter pilot	Credited as "Rip Haight"	
1993	Body Bags	The Coroner		
1994	The Silence of the Hams	Trenchcoat man and Gimp		
1995	Village of the Damned	Man at gas station phone		
2016	The Puppet Man	The Taxi Driver		
2019	The Rise of the Synths	Narrator and Synth Rider's guide		
2022	Studio 666	Engineer	Credited as "Rip Haight"	

== Television series ==
Year	Title	Director	Executive producer	Composer	Notes	Ref(s)
2005–2006	Masters of Horror	Yes	No	No	Episodes: "Cigarette Burns" and "Pro-Life"	
2015–2017	Zoo	No	No	Yes	Theme music only	
2023	Suburban Screams	Yes	Yes	Yes	Theme music only, Episode: "Phone Stalker"	
TBA	John Carpenter Presents	TBA	Yes	TBA		

== Podcast series ==
Year	Title	Executive producer	Notes / Ref(s)
2021	Roanoke Falls	Yes	
2022	Angel to Some	Yes	
2022	Furnace	Yes	

== Video games ==
Year	Title	Role	Notes	Ref(s)
1998	Sentinel Returns	—N/a	Composer	
2002	The Thing	Dr. Faraday	Uncredited	
2011	F.E.A.R. 3	Narrator	Also storyline consultant	
2026	John Carpenter's Toxic Commando	—N/a	Composer	
2026	Halloween: The Game	—N/a	Composer, creative consultant and executive producer	

== Bibliography ==
- John Carpenter Presents Storm Kids
- John Carpenter's Asylum
- John Carpenter's Night Terrors
- John Carpenter's Tales for a Halloween Night
- John Carpenter's Tales of Science Fiction
- Cathedral (2026)

== Reception ==
This is a list of films directed by John Carpenter that grossed more than $8 million at the US box office according to Box Office Mojo. Carpenter's films have grossed domestically a total of more than $300 million, with an average of $18 million per film.

Rank	Title	Lifetime gross (US$)	Rating	
Rank	Title	Lifetime gross (US$)	Rotten Tomatoes	Metacritic
1	Halloween	47.0 million	96% (84 reviews)	87 (21 reviews)
2	Starman	28.7 million	86% (36 reviews)	70 (8 reviews)
3	Escape from L.A.	25.4 million	54% (59 reviews)	54 (21 reviews)
4	Escape from New York	25.2 million	88% (72 reviews)	76 (12 reviews)
5	The Fog	21.3 million	75% (69 reviews)	55 (11 reviews)
6	Christine	21.0 million	70% (37 reviews)	57 (10 reviews)
7	Vampires	20.3 million	43% (53 reviews)	42 (19 reviews)
8	The Thing	19.6 million	84% (83 reviews)	57 (13 reviews)
9	Memoirs of an Invisible Man	14.3 million	26% (35 reviews)	48 (19 reviews)
10	Prince of Darkness	14.1 million	62% (39 reviews)	50 (10 reviews)
11	Ghosts of Mars	14.0 million	23% (111 reviews)	35 (26 reviews)
12	They Live	13.0 million	86% (74 reviews)	55 (22 reviews)
13	The Ward	12.8 million	33% (72 reviews)	38 (18 reviews)
14	Big Trouble in Little China	11.1 million	76% (66 reviews)	53 (14 reviews)
15	Village of the Damned	9.4 million	28% (39 reviews)	41 (14 reviews)
16	In the Mouth of Madness	8.9 million	60% (50 reviews)	53 (17 reviews)
17	Assault on Precinct 13	N/A	96% (51 reviews)	89 (7 reviews)
18	Dark Star	N/A	74% (34 reviews)	66 (10 reviews)

== See also ==
- John Carpenter's unrealized projects
