= Sandy King (producer) =

American director, producer and businesswoman (born 1952)

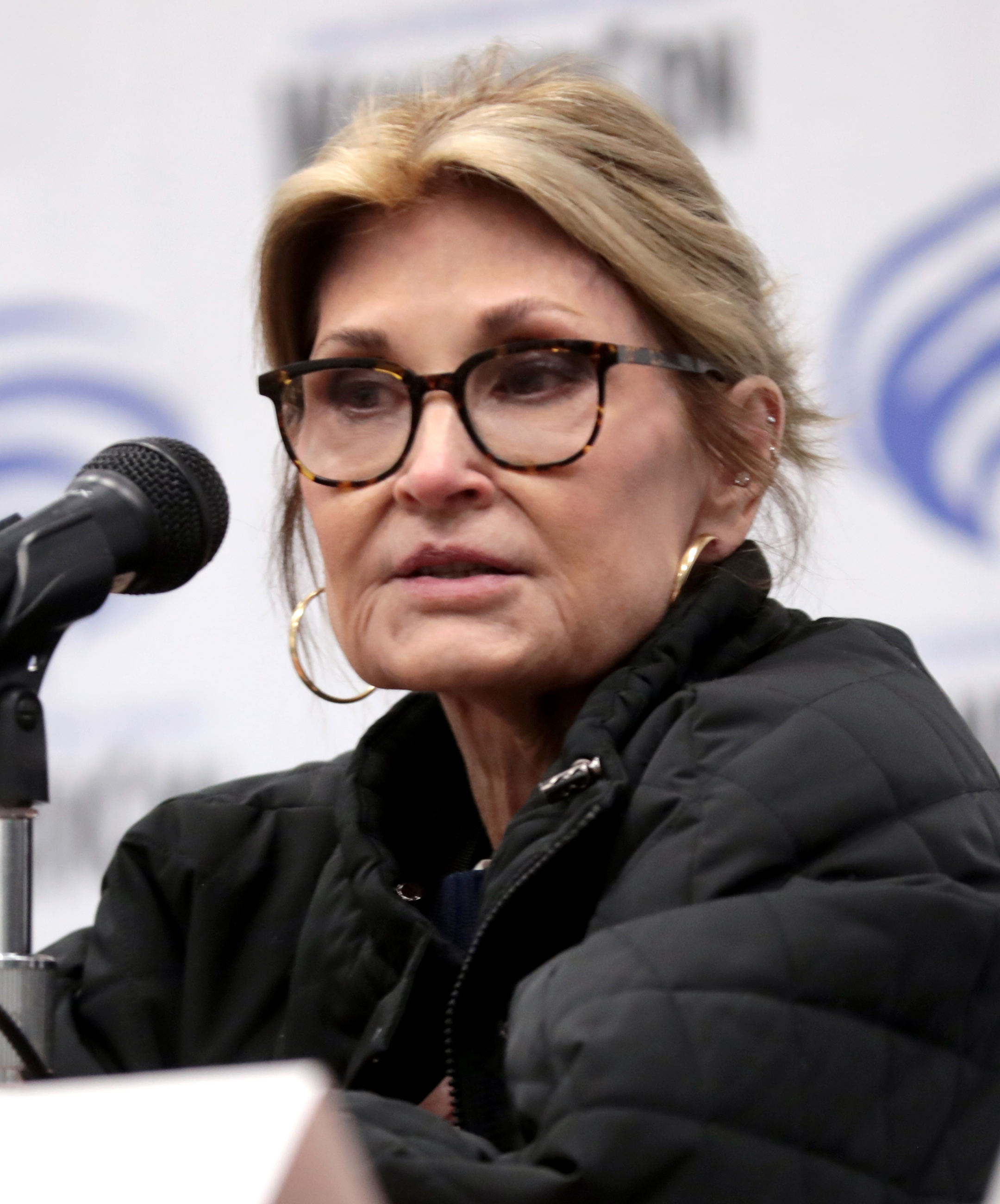
- King at the 2023 WonderCon in Anaheim, California
- Born: Sandra Ann King; March 8, 1952 (age 74); Los Angeles, California, U.S.
- Education: University of California, Los Angeles
- Occupations: Film producer; script supervisor; comic book publisher
- Years active: 1973–present
- Known for: They Live; In the Mouth of Madness; Vampires; Ghosts of Mars; Storm King Comics
- Spouse: John Carpenter (m. 1990)

Sandra Ann King (born March 8, 1952) is an American film producer, script supervisor, and comic book publisher. She is the founder and chief executive of Storm King Productions and its comics division, Storm King Comics, and is best known for producing a series of horror and science-fiction films directed by her husband, John Carpenter, including They Live, In the Mouth of Madness, Village of the Damned, Vampires, and Ghosts of Mars. She co-created the comic book series Asylum, in which Carpenter is also involved.

== Early life and family ==
King was born Sandra Ann King on March 8, 1952, in Los Angeles, California. She attended the Westlake School in Los Angeles, graduating in 1969, and went on to study at the University of California, Los Angeles (UCLA) College of Fine Arts, where she majored in pictorial arts and received her bachelor's degree in 1973. While at UCLA she studied hand-drawn animation, and in 1973 she worked on the animated short film Anti-Matter.

== Career ==
=== Script supervision ===
King began her career in the film industry in the mid-1970s as a script supervisor. Her first feature credit in the role was on John Cassavetes' The Killing of a Chinese Bookie (1976). She subsequently worked as script supervisor on Roger Corman's Bad Georgia Road (1977), Michael Mann's Thief (1981), Francis Ford Coppola's Rumble Fish (1983), and John Hughes' Sixteen Candles (1984), among other features and television productions. In 1984, she served as script supervisor on John Carpenter's Starman, the film on which she first met Carpenter.

=== Film and television production ===
King transitioned into producing on Carpenter's films during the late 1980s, serving as associate producer on Prince of Darkness (1987) and They Live (1988). She went on to produce Body Bags (1993), In the Mouth of Madness (1994), Village of the Damned (1995), Vampires (1998), and Ghosts of Mars (2001), all directed by Carpenter. In 2021, she produced the Blumhouse and Amazon Studios horror feature The Manor. She has also served as a producer on the Peacock anthology series John Carpenter's Suburban Screams (2023) and on the fiction podcast Roanoke Falls.

=== Storm King Productions and Storm King Comics ===
King founded Storm King Productions in 1991 as a film, television, and podcast production company. In 2012, she launched Storm King Comics as a division of the company, becoming the first woman to found a comic-book publishing house. The imprint's debut title, John Carpenter's Asylum, was co-created by King, Carpenter, and Thomas Ian Griffith. Storm King Comics has since published more than 100 issues and 30 graphic novels and trade paperbacks, including the annual horror anthology John Carpenter's Tales for a HalloweeNight, the monthly anthology John Carpenter's Tales of Science Fiction, John Carpenter's Night Terrors, the all-ages line John Carpenter Presents Storm Kids, and the imprint Storm King Comics Dark & Twisted. In 2019, King launched the Storm Kids line, aimed at readers aged 4 to 18.

== Personal life ==
King met John Carpenter while working as script supervisor on Starman (1984); the two married in 1990 and live in Hollywood, California.

== Comics ==
- John Carpenter Presents Storm Kids
- John Carpenter's Asylum
- John Carpenter's Night Terrors
- John Carpenter's Tales for a Halloween Night
- John Carpenter's Tales of Science Fiction

Won Foreword Indy Fab Awards twice.

== Filmography ==
- Body Bags (1993)
- In the Mouth of Madness (1994)
- Village of the Damned (1995)
- Vampires (1998)
- Ghosts of Mars (2001)
- Vampires: Los Muertos (2002)
- The Manor (2021)
- Roanoke Falls (2021)
- Angel to Some (2022)
- Furnace (2022)
- Suburban Screams (2023)
- John Carpenter Presents (TBA)

== Accolades ==
For her work on Village of the Damned, she was nominated at the 16th Golden Raspberry Awards for "Worst Remake, Rip-off or Sequel".
