= The Librarians (2003 film) =

2001 film by Mike Kirton

- Directed by: Mike Kirton
- Written by: William Forsythe; Mike Kirton
- Produced by: Greg Hauptner
- Starring: William Forsythe; Andrew Divoff; Erika Eleniak; Christopher Atkins
- Cinematography: Gary B. Kibbe
- Edited by: Rinaldo Marsili
- Music by: John Pratt
- Production company: Global Pictures
- Release date: December 16, 2003
- Running time: 96 minutes
- Country: United States
- Language: English
- Budget: $4 million

The Librarians (also known as Strike Force) is a 2003 action thriller film directed by Mike Kirton. The film stars William Forsythe, Andrew Divoff, Erika Eleniak, and Christopher Atkins.

== Plot ==
William Clark (played by Michael Parks), a former associate of Simon (played by William Forsythe), hires Simon who, along with his pal mercenaries Toshko and G-Man, call themselves The Librarians. Their goal is to find Clark's missing granddaughter Amanda. With the help of his old friend, Irish (played uncredited by Burt Reynolds), Simon runs into Sandi (played by Erika Eleniak) at the strip club where Amanda was working before she disappeared. Simon soon learns that Sandi, who is working at this strip club, is actually a Chicago police detective and martial arts expert who is there trying to find her sister who's been missing for a year. Together they try to find Amanda and whether Sandi's sister is still alive. As Sandi and Simon get closer to the truth and each other, the danger and the heat will rise.

== Cast ==
- William Forsythe as Simon
- Andrew Divoff as Marcos
- Erika Eleniak as Sandi Clark
- Christopher Atkins as Ringo
- Daniel Bernhardt as Toshko
- Rebecca Forsythe as Megan
- Burt Reynolds as 'Irish' (uncredited)
- Matthias Hues as Ciro
- Amaury Nolasco as 'G-Man'
- Ed Lauter as John Strong
- Michael Parks as William Clark

== Production ==
Shooting took place in Palm Beach County, Florida. Local schoolchildren worked on the set as interns, recruited from an educational program begun by producer Greg Hauptner.

== Release ==
The film was originally released as The Librarians in 2001. Lionsgate released it in the US in 2003 as Strike Force.

== Reception ==
David Johnson of DVD Verdict wrote, "Suffice it to say, Strike Force is every bit as stupid and forgettable as its insipid title suggests."
