= Gary B. Kibbe =

American cinematographer (1941–2020)

- Born: 9 January 1941; Los Angeles, California.
- Died: 9 March 2020 (aged 79)
- Years active: 1970–2003
- Organization: American Society of Cinematographers

Gary Brian Kibbe (January 9, 1941 – March 9, 2020) was an American cinematographer, known mostly for his collaboration with director John Carpenter.

== Filmography ==
Film

Year	Title	Director
1987	Prince of Darkness	John Carpenter
1988	They Live	John Carpenter
1993	RoboCop 3	Fred Dekker
1994	In the Mouth of Madness	John Carpenter
1994	Double Dragon	James Yukich
1995	Village of the Damned	John Carpenter
1996	Escape from L.A.	John Carpenter
1998	Vampires	John Carpenter
2001	Ghosts of Mars	John Carpenter
2003	The Librarians	Mike Kirton

TV movies

Year	Title	Director	Notes
1991	Blood River	Mel Damski	With Robert M. Baldwin
1992	Two-Fisted Tales	Tom Holland	Segment "King of the Road"
1993	Body Bags	John Carpenter; Tobe Hooper	

TV series

Year	Title	Director	Notes
1992	Tales from the Crypt	Tom Holland	Episode "King of the Road"
1998-1999	Soldier of Fortune, Inc.	Reynaldo Villalobos; Jason Bloom; Steve Yaconelli	5 episodes
2002	CSI: Crime Scene Investigation	Kenneth Fink	Episode "Anatomy of a Lye"
