= Ghosts of Mars =

2001 film by John Carpenter

- Theatrical release poster
- Directed by: John Carpenter
- Written by: John Carpenter; Larry Sulkis
- Produced by: Sandy King
- Starring: Ice Cube; Natasha Henstridge; Jason Statham; Pam Grier; Clea DuVall; Joanna Cassidy
- Cinematography: Gary B. Kibbe
- Edited by: Paul C. Warschilka
- Music by: John Carpenter
- Production companies: Screen Gems; Storm King Productions
- Distributed by: Sony Pictures Releasing
- Release date: August 24, 2001
- Running time: 98 minutes
- Country: United States
- Language: English
- Budget: $28 million
- Box office: $14 million

Ghosts of Mars (titled onscreen as John Carpenter's Ghosts of Mars) is a 2001 American action horror film written, directed and scored by John Carpenter. It was produced by Screen Gems and distributed by Sony Pictures Releasing. It stars Natasha Henstridge, Ice Cube, Jason Statham, Pam Grier, Clea DuVall and Joanna Cassidy. Set on a colonized Mars in the 22nd century, the film follows a squad of police officers and a convicted criminal who fight against the residents of a mining colony who have been possessed by the ghosts of the planet's original inhabitants.

Ghosts of Mars received mostly negative reviews and was a box office flop, earning $14 million against a $28 million production budget, although it garnered a cult following since its release. The film would be John Carpenter's last until his return with The Ward in 2010.

== Plot ==
In the year 2176, Mars has been 84% terraformed, giving the planet an Earth-like atmosphere. Martian society has become matriarchal, centering on the city of Chryse, with smaller outposts connected by an expansive network of trains. Police Lieutenant Melanie Ballard is called before a tribunal to give testimony, following a disastrous mission to the remote mining outpost Shining Canyon to retrieve convicted felon James 'Desolation' Williams to stand trial. She is apparently the sole survivor.

Through a series of flashbacks (and flashbacks within flashbacks as new perspectives are incorporated into the narrative), Ballard recounts the mission. Ballard's crew, consisting of Commander Helena Braddock, cocky Sergeant Jericho Butler, and rookie officers Bashira Kincaid and Michael Descanso, arrive to find Shining Canyon deserted. Investigating the local jail, they discover three people in one of the cells; among them, scientist Dr. Arlene Whitlock. They also find a number of possessed miners and the convict Williams.

When Braddock suddenly disappears, Butler looks for her while Williams escapes. Ballard and Williams are attacked by the miners, forcing them to work together. Outside, Butler witnesses a possessed miner impale Captain Braddock's severed head on a spike alongside many others. He then discovers a large assembly of miners in the canyon below, committing horrific acts of self-mutilation and ritualistic execution.

While Williams and his crew originally plan on leaving the officers to die, Ballard convinces them to work together to survive against the miners. Their initial effort to escape is halted when the miners attack, killing, injuring and infecting several of them. Whitlock reveals that she fled from her post after discovering an ancient underground vault created by an extinct Martian civilization. When the door to the vault was opened, it released hostile spirits or "ghosts", which took possession of the workers, causing their violent behavior. Killing a possessed human merely releases the Martian spirit to possess another host. Ballard surmises that these Martian spirits believe humans to be an invading race. Ballard herself is briefly possessed; believing her to be dead, Butler and Williams leave her outside and Butler feeds her an illegal hallucinogenic drug that Ballard had been taking to get high, which forces the Martian spirit to leave her body.

The group is forced to flee as the possessed workers breach the jail. While they escape on the train, Ballard realizes they have a duty to exterminate the Martian threat and decides to return to Shining Canyon and overload the outpost's nuclear power plant, assuming that the ensuing atomic blast will vaporize the spirits. During this mission, Whitlock is possessed, while Butler, Kincaid, and the two train operators are killed. Boarding the train as the last two survivors, Ballard and Williams escape the explosion. Unwilling to face the authorities, Williams handcuffs Ballard to her cot and escapes. Having taken to him, she lets him go.

Resting after her trial, Ballard is woken by an alert that the city is under attack and realizes that their attempt to destroy the spirits failed. She is greeted by Williams and the two agree to fight their way out together.

== Cast ==
- Natasha Henstridge as Lieutenant Melanie Ballard
- Ice Cube as James "Desolation" Williams
- Jason Statham as Sergeant Jericho Butler
- Clea DuVall as Officer Bashira Kincaid
- Pam Grier as Commander Helena Braddock
- Joanna Cassidy as Dr. Arlene Whitlock
- Richard Cetrone as Big Daddy Mars
- Eileen Weisinger as Woman Warrior
- Liam Waite as Officer Michael Descanso
- Duane Davis as "Uno" Williams
- Lobo Sebastian as "Dos"
- Rodney A. Grant as "Tres"
- Peter Jason as McSimms
- Wanda De Jesus as Akooshay
- Robert Carradine as Rodale
- Rosemary Forsyth as Inquisitor
- Doug McGrath as Benchley
- Rick Edelstein as Zimmerman
- Rex Linn as Yared
- Marjean Holden as Young Woman
- Charlotte Cornwell as The Narrator

== Production ==
The script to Ghosts of Mars originally started off as a potential Snake Plissken sequel. However, this rumor has been publicly dispelled by the film's producer, Sandy King Carpenter.

Michelle Yeoh, Franka Potente and Famke Janssen were the first choices for the role of Melanie Ballard, but they turned it down. Courtney Love was originally cast, but she left the project. Natasha Henstridge replaced her at the suggestion of her boyfriend Liam Waite. Jason Statham was originally going to play Desolation Williams, but he was replaced by Ice Cube because the producers needed some star power for the part, and Statham instead played the character of Jericho Butler.

Much of the film was shot in a New Mexico gypsum mine. The pure white gypsum had to be dyed with gallons of food coloring to recreate the red Martian landscape.

=== Music ===
For the film's soundtrack, John Carpenter recorded a number of synthesizer pieces and assembled an all-star cast of guitarists (including thrash metal band Anthrax, virtuoso Steve Vai, genre spanning Buckethead, and former Guns N' Roses and Nine Inch Nails guitarist Robin Finck) to record an energetic and technically proficient heavy metal score. Reaction to the soundtrack was mixed; many critics praised the high standard of musicianship and the strong pairing of heavy metal riffs with the film's action sequences, but complained about the overlong guitar solos, the drastic differences between the cues used in the film and the full tracks and the absence of any of the film's ambient synth score from the soundtrack CD.

== Release ==
=== Critical reception ===
On the review aggregator website Rotten Tomatoes, 22% of 174 critics' reviews are positive, with an average rating of 3.5/10. The website's consensus reads: "A tired recycling of John Carpenter's past triumphs, Ghosts of Mars buries its pulpy potential beneath clumsy dialogue, choppy storytelling, and monotonous action that generates little suspense." Metacritic, which uses a weighted average, assigned the film a score of 35 out of 100, based on 26 critics, indicating "generally unfavorable" reviews. Audiences polled by CinemaScore gave the film an average grade of "C−" on an A+ to F scale.

Rita Kempley of The Washington Post called the film "a schlocky, sluggish shoot-em-up", giving the film one star out of five, and later listing the film as the third worst film of the year. Marc Savlov of The Austin Chronicle gave the film one star out of five, saying: "Ghosts of Mars is a muddled, derivative, and embarrassing disaster straight on through." Bruce Fretts of Entertainment Weekly said about the film "...it's distressingly amateurish and hackneyed to the point of absurdity," further adding "it's dishearting to see the 'master of horror' bring himself to both write and direct a film with such a prepubescent understanding of horror". James Berardinelli gave the film 1.5 stars out of four. Rob Gonsalves of eFilmCritic.com suggested that the film was symbolic of "Carpenter at rock bottom". According to press reviews, factors contributing to the box office failure of the film included "poor set designs, hammy acting and a poorly developed script".

Conversely, Roger Ebert of the Chicago Sun-Times, gave the film three stars out of four, writing: "Ghosts of Mars delivers on its chosen level and I enjoyed it, but I wonder why so many science-fiction films turn into extended exercises in Blast the Aliens...this is an instance where it works." Richard Roeper also awarded the film three stars out of four, saying: "is it stupid? Certainly. I think that's the point. Carpenter is a smart man and he knows exactly what he's doing. I miss seeing campy action flicks like this at the drive-in." David Stratton and Margaret Pomeranz, film critics for The Movie Show, both awarded the film three stars out of five. In his review, Stratton made the following observation: "John Carpenter doesn't seem to have moved forward from the 70s and early 80s, when he made his best films. Though it's not terribly exciting, Ghosts Of Mars does have a marvelously skewed vision and can deliver genuine morbid laughs when it wants to."

About the film’s reception, director John Carpenter later commented: “I have no power over what critics say, but when people complained about the movie being campy and not scary…the name of the movie is Ghosts of Mars, I figured the campiness would be self-explanatory.”

=== Retrospective reception ===
Several cast members reflected on their experiences making Ghosts of Mars. Ice Cube has been openly critical of the film: "I don't like that movie. I'm a big fan of John Carpenter and the only reason I did it was because John Carpenter directed it but they really didn't have the money to pull the special effects off." He reiterated his dislike in a 2014 interview calling it the worst film of his career: "It's because of the effects. I think the effects were 1979. I wasn't feeling that movie, even though a lot of science fiction buffs love it. I could have passed."

Natasha Henstridge has spoken more positively about the experience, recalling that she "loved the experience of making the film" and particularly enjoyed the physical training and action sequences involved in the role. She also praised Carpenter, describing him as a filmmaker with "a great sense of humor".

In retrospect, John Carpenter said: "It is underrated and didn’t do very well, but I like lots of things about it.”

Filmink magazine noted "even though John Carpenter is John Carpenter" the film's "cult status has been very slow in coming. We don't know why that is – hesitation about Natasha Henstridge in a role originally meant for Courtney Love? Awkwardness with the film's (arguably) pro drug stance? Disliking movies set on Mars (this was the era of Red Planet and Mission to Mars)? We think Ghosts of Mars is great."

=== Box office ===
The film opened at No. 9 in the North American box office in its opening weekend (8/24-26) with $3,804,452, grossed $8,709,640 in the North American domestic box office, and $5,301,192 internationally, totaling $14,010,832 worldwide. On a budget of $28 million, Ghosts of Mars was a box office failure.

== See also ==
- List of ghost films
- List of films set on Mars
- Mars in fiction
- List of films featuring extraterrestrials
