= Larry Franco =

American film producer

- Born: Larry Joseph Franco; April 5, 1949 (age 77); Sonora, California
- Occupation: Film producer
- Spouse: Jill Russell (div. 1984)
- Children: 2, including Matt
- Relatives: Kurt Russell (former brother-in-law); Bing Russell (former father-in-law)

Larry Joseph Franco (born April 5, 1949) is an American film producer. He has also served as an actor, second unit director and assistant director. He is the father of former Atlanta Braves baseball player Matt Franco and Phronsie Franco. He is the ex-brother-in-law of actor Kurt Russell and the ex-son-in-law of actor Bing Russell. Franco attended UCLA film school.

== Filmography ==
Producer

- Escape from New York (1981)
- Starman (1984)
- Big Trouble in Little China (1986)
- Prince of Darkness (1987)
- They Live (1988)
- Mars Attacks! (1996)
- October Sky (1999)
- Jurassic Park III (2001)
- Hulk (2003)
- Batman Begins (2005)
- The Spiderwick Chronicles (2008)
- 2012 (2009)
- Anonymous (2011)
- White House Down (2013)
- The Nutcracker and the Four Realms (2018)

Executive producer

- The Rocketeer (1991)
- Jumanji (1995)
- Sleepy Hollow (1999)
- Independence Day: Resurgence (2016)
- Discarnate (2018)

Associate producer

- Cutter's Way (1981)
- The Thing (1982)

Co-producer

- Christine (1983)
- Tango & Cash (1989)
- Batman Returns (1992)

Line producer

- Two Bits (1995)

Consulting producer

- Jungle Cruise (2021)

Unit production manager

- Independence Day: Resurgence (2016)

Assistant director

- March or Die (1977)
- The Rose (1979)

First assistant director

- Elvis (1979) (TV movie)
- The Fog (1980)
- Cutter's Way (1981)
- Escape from New York (1981)
- The Thing (1982)
- Christine (1983)
- Starman (1984)
- Big Trouble in Little China (1986)
- Prince of Darkness (1987)
- They Live (1988)

Second assistant director

- Harry and Walter Go to New York (1976)
- Black Sunday (1977)
- Straight Time (1978)
- Foul Play (1978)
- Apocalypse Now (1979)

Acting credits

Year	Film	Role	Notes
1975	The Strongest Man in the World	Larry (Student)	
1979	Apocalypse Now	Soldier Clinging to Helicopter	Uncredited
1982	The Thing	Norwegian Passenger	
1988	They Live	Neighbor	
