= Body Bags (film) =

1993 American horror comedy anthology television film

- US poster
- Genre: Horror
- Written by: Billy Brown; Dan Angel
- Directed by: John Carpenter; Tobe Hooper
- Starring: Stacy Keach; David Warner; Sheena Easton; Debbie Harry; Mark Hamill; Twiggy; Robert Carradine
- Music by: John Carpenter; Jim Lang
- Country of origin: United States
- Original language: English

Production
- Executive producers: Dan Angel; John Carpenter; Sandy King
- Producers: Dan Angel; Sandy King
- Production locations: 13030 Pearblossom Hwy, Pearblossom, California; Newhall, California; Downtown, Los Angeles; Woodland Hills, Los Angeles; Pearblossom, California
- Cinematography: Gary B. Kibbe
- Editor: Edward A. Warschilka
- Running time: 91 minutes
- Production companies: 187 Corp. Showtime Networks

Original release
- Release: August 8, 1993

Body Bags is a 1993 American horror comedy anthology television film featuring three unconnected stories, with bookend segments featuring John Carpenter, Tom Arnold and Tobe Hooper as deranged morgue attendees. It was directed by Carpenter and Hooper, with Larry Sulkis handling the bookend segments. It first aired on August 8, 1993. It is notable for its numerous celebrity cameo appearances.

The first story, "The Gas Station", features Robert Carradine as a gas station attendant with cameos by David Naughton, Sam Raimi, and Wes Craven. "Hair" follows Stacy Keach as he receives a botched hair transplant that infests him with an alien parasite. "Eye" features Mark Hamill as a baseball player who loses an eye in a car accident and receives a transplant, only to be taken over by the personality of the eye's previous owner, a serial killer.

== Plot ==
=== Prologue ===
A creepy-looking coroner introduces three different horror tales involving his current work on various gruesome cadavers in "body bags."

=== "The Gas Station" ===
Directed by John Carpenter. Anne is a young college student who arrives for her first shift working at an all-night filling station near Haddonfield, Illinois (a reference to the setting of Carpenter's Halloween). The worker going off shift, Bill, reminds her that a serial killer has broken out of a mental hospital and cautions her not to leave the booth at the station without the keys because the door locks automatically. After Bill leaves, Anne is alone and the tension mounts as she deals with various late-night customers, unsure whether any of them might be the escaped maniac. When a customer ("Pete") forgets his credit card, Anne runs after him and accidentally locks herself out of the booth. Before she can get the spare key from a nearby garage, a homeless transient (George Buck Flower) approaches her and asks to use the restroom. Anne returns to the booth and gives the transient the restroom key. Anne later goes inside the men's restroom to check on the transient, only to find an elaborately grotesque drawing of an evil-looking entity carrying beheaded people. She panics and runs out, only to find the dead body of the transient sitting in a pickup truck on a lift in one of the garage bays. She then tries to make a phone call for help, which results in her realization that "Bill," the attending worker she met earlier, is in fact the escaped murderer, who has killed the real Bill and taken his place. The fake "Bill" attempts to kill Anne with a machete, breaking into the locked booth by smashing out the glass with a sledgehammer, then chasing her around the deserted filling station and garage. Just as he is about to kill her, Pete suddenly returns in search of his credit card. He wrestles the killer, giving Anne time to crush the maniac under the vehicle lift.

=== "Hair" ===
Directed by John Carpenter. Richard Coberts is a middle-aged businessman who is very self-conscious about his thinning hair. This obsession has caused a rift between him and his long-suffering girlfriend Megan who loves him regardless of his physical appearance but is frustrated with his vain attitude. Richard answers a television ad about a "miracle" hair transplant procedure, pays a visit to the office, and meets the shady Dr. Lock, who agrees to give Richard a solution to make his hair grow back. The next day, Richard wakes up and removes the bandage around his head, and is overjoyed to find that he has a full head of hair. But soon he becomes increasingly sick and fatigued, and finds his hair continuing to grow and, additionally, growing out of parts of his body, where hair does not normally grow. Trying to cut a hair out of his mouth, he hears it shriek and, examining it under a magnifying glass, sees that it's alive and resembles a tiny serpent. He goes back to Dr. Lock for an explanation, but finds himself a prisoner as Dr. Lock explains that he and his entire staff are aliens from another planet, seeking out narcissistic and vain human beings and planting seeds of "hair" to take over their bodies for consumption as part of their plan to spread their essence to Earth. A near-comatose Richard is last seen sitting with his long hair being brushed by the nurse and the alien serpents being extracted for future hair transplants.

=== "Eye" ===
Directed by Tobe Hooper. Brent Matthews is an aging Minor League Baseball player (about to be called up to the Majors) whose life and career take a turn for the worse when he gets into a serious car accident in which his right eye is gouged out. Unwilling to admit that his career is over, he jumps at the chance to undergo an experimental surgical procedure to replace his eye with one from a recently deceased person. But soon after the surgery he begins hallucinate things out of his new eye, and begins having nightmares of killing women and having sex with them. Brent seeks out the doctor who operated on him, and the doctor tells him that the donor of his new eye was John Randall, a recently executed serial killer and necrophiliac. Brent becomes convinced that the spirit of the dead killer is taking over his body so that he can resume killing women. He flees back to his house and tells his skeptical wife, Cathy, about what is happening. Just then, the spirit of the killer emerges and attempts to kill Cathy as well. Cathy fights back, subduing him long enough for Brent to re-emerge. Realizing that it is only a matter of time before the killer takes control again, Brent stabs his donated eye with garden shears, severing his link with the killer but also causing him to bleed to death.

=== Epilogue ===
The coroner is finishing telling his last tale when he hears a noise from outside the morgue. He crawls back inside a body bag, revealing that he himself is a living cadaver and not a coroner. The noise is shown to be the return of two other morgue workers, who begin to autopsy the "John Doe" corpse of the narrator.

== Cast ==
"The Morgue" (Prologue)

- John Carpenter as The Coroner

"The Gas Station"

- Alex Datcher as Anne
- Robert Carradine as Bill
- Wes Craven as Pasty-Faced Man
- Sam Raimi as Dead Bill
- David Naughton as Pete
- Lucy Boryer as Peggy
- George Buck Flower as Stranger
- Peter Jason as Gent
- Molly Cheek as Divorcee

"Hair"

- Stacy Keach as Richard Coberts
- David Warner as Dr. Lock
- Sheena Easton as Megan
- Dan Blom as Dennis
- Gregory Nicotero as Man With Dog
- Kim Alexis as Woman With Beautiful Hair
- Attila as Man With Beautiful Hair
- Deborah Harry as The Nurse

"Eye"

- Mark Hamill as Brent Matthews
- Twiggy as Cathy Matthews
- John Agar as Dr. Lang
- Roger Corman as Dr. Bregman
- Charles Napier as Baseball Team Manager
- Eddie Velez as Baseball Player

"The Morgue" (Epilogue)

- John Carpenter as The Coroner / Cadaver
- Tom Arnold as Morgue Worker #1
- Tobe Hooper as Morgue Worker #2

== Background ==
Showtime Networks planned to create Body Bags as a television series similar to HBO's Tales from the Crypt. However, shortly after filming began, Showtime decided not to pursue the series. The three completed stories were assembled around John Carpenter's narration segment, and Body Bags became a horror anthology.

In an interview for the book John Carpenter: The Prince Of Darkness, Carpenter explained his reasoning for working on the project: "I wanted to have the experience of playing in make-up. I thought it would be fun and it wasn't fun. It took hours to get me into that make-up every day. I enjoyed the stories a lot. I especially enjoyed the one with Stacy Keach, the hair story. It was quick and shot very fast, which is a good thing. It's a tune-up. It's like a little refresher course. It had things I hadn't done in a long time, and I just wanted to try them out."

Filming took place in early 1993, with Carpenter directing his segments in January.

== Home media ==
The film was released on Blu-ray in Shout Factory!'s Scream Factory series in late fall 2013.

== Soundtrack ==
Body Bags

Film score by John Carpenter & Jim Lang
- Released: 1993
- Genre: Film score
- Length: 55:33
- Label: Varèse Sarabande
- Producers: John Carpenter, Jim Lang

John Carpenter chronology
Christine (1989)	Body Bags (1993)	In the Mouth of Madness (1995)

Jim Lang chronology
The Letters from Moab (1991)	Body Bags (1993)	In the Mouth of Madness (1995)

The soundtrack is by John Carpenter (composition, performance, production) and Jim Lang (composition, performance, synthesizer programming, recording, mixing, production), with Robert Townson being the executive producer. It was released in 1993 through Varèse Sarabande.

=== Track listing ===
All music is composed by John Carpenter & Jim Lang.

No.	Title	Length
1.	"The Coroner's Theme"	6:28
2.	"The Picture on the Wall"	1:14
3.	"Alone"	3:46
4.	"Cornered"	1:41
5.	"Locked Out"	3:11
6.	"The Corpse In the Cab"	3:00
7.	"Body Bag #1"	2:16
8.	"Brain Trouble"	4:50
9.	"Long Beautiful Hair"	5:40
10.	"Broken Glass"	1:05
11.	"Dr. Lang"	2:44
12.	"The Operation"	1:15
13.	"I Can See"	1:05
14.	"Vision"	0:54
15.	"Vision and Voices"	4:34
16.	"Put Them In the Ground"	1:22
17.	"Vision and Rape"	2:21
18.	"John Randall"	4:20
19.	"...Pluck It Out"	3:47
Total length:		55:33

== Critical reception ==
Body Bags was generally well received by critics and holds a 73% approval rating on movie review aggregator website Rotten Tomatoes from 11 reviews. Metacritic, which uses a weighted average, assigned the film a score of 54 out of 100, based on 13 critics, indicating "mixed or average" reviews.

However, Time Out called the film "an attempt by a pair of one-time horror auteurs to emulate the successful Tales from the Crypt formula, only now it's nowhere near as happening."

Reviewing the film in Variety, Tony Scott stated that "None of the three playlets breaks barriers, and the writing's perfunctory, but the productions are good, the casting interesting".

== See also ==
- Nightmares - a 1983 anthology film with television roots.
- List of horror anthology films
