= Blood River (1991 film) =

1991 Western television film

- Genre: Western
- Written by: John Carpenter
- Directed by: Mel Damski
- Starring: Ricky Schroder; Wilford Brimley; Adrienne Barbeau; Mills Watson
- Music by: William Goldstein
- Country of origin: United States
- Original language: English

Production
- Executive producers: Mel Damski; Merrill Karpf
- Producer: Andrew Gottlieb
- Cinematography: Robert M. Baldwin Jr.; Gary B. Kibbe
- Editor: Bernard Gribble
- Running time: 92 minutes
- Production companies: CBS Entertainment Productions; Little Apple Productions

Original release
- Network: CBS
- Release: March 17, 1991

Blood River is a 1991 American Western television film directed by Mel Damski, written by John Carpenter, and starring Ricky Schroder, Wilford Brimley, and Adrienne Barbeau. Carpenter wrote the screenplay in 1971 with the intent that it would be a feature film starring John Wayne. The film premiered on CBS on March 17, 1991.

== Cast ==
- Ricky Schroder as Jimmy "The Kid" Pearls
- Wilford Brimley as U.S. Marshal Winston Patrick Culler
- Adrienne Barbeau as Georgina
- John P. Ryan as Henry Logan
- Mills Watson as Jake
- Henry Beckman as Sheriff Webber
- Dwight C. Mcfee as Squints
- Don S. Davis as Congressman Adams
- Jay Brazeau as Hotchner

== Production ==
John Carpenter originally wrote the script in 1971 for John Wayne. Batjac, Wayne's company, read it in the mid 1970s and hired him to do a rewrite. He did but "never quite found out what was going on there. Maybe Wayne didn't want to do any more Westerns. I worked with Michael Wayne and Tom Kane, and they would do things like take out some of the harder action stuff, making it easier on him."

In the script the John Wayne character was an old riverboat rat who was really a U.S. Marshal searching for some criminals. He met up with another man and they went down the river, like Huckleberry Finn.

"I'd love to have had Hawks direct it but Hawks was too old," said Carpenter. "I would love to have directed it, but I don't think they would have let me."

The film was eventually shot in Calgary, Alberta in June 1990.
