= They Live =

1988 film by John Carpenter

- Theatrical release poster
- Directed by: John Carpenter
- Screenplay by: John Carpenter (Note: For the screenplay, Carpenter was credited by the pseudonym "Frank Armitage".)
- Based on: "Eight O'Clock in the Morning" by Ray Nelson
- Produced by: Larry Franco
- Starring: Roddy Piper; Keith David; Meg Foster
- Cinematography: Gary B. Kibbe
- Edited by: Gib Jaffe; Frank E. Jimenez
- Music by: John Carpenter; Alan Howarth
- Production companies: Alive Films; Larry Franco Productions
- Distributed by: Universal Pictures (North America); Carolco Pictures (International)
- Release date: November 4, 1988
- Running time: 94 minutes
- Country: United States
- Language: English
- Budget: $4 million
- Box office: $13.4 million (North America)

They Live is a 1988 American science fiction action horror film written, directed, and scored by John Carpenter, and starring Roddy Piper, Keith David, and Meg Foster. It was based on the 1963 short story "Eight O'Clock in the Morning" by Ray Nelson. Set in Los Angeles, it follows a working class drifter (Piper) who discovers that the ruling class are camouflaged aliens, which drives him on a quest to expose them to the world.

Having acquired the film rights to the story prior to the production of They Live, Carpenter used the story as the basis for the screenplay's structure, which he wrote under the pseudonym "Frank Armitage." Carpenter has stated that the themes of They Live stemmed from his dissatisfaction with the economic policies of then-U.S. President Ronald Reagan, as well as what Carpenter saw as increasing commercialization in both popular culture and politics.

They Live was released by Universal Pictures in the United States on November 4, 1988, and was a minor success upon release, debuting at number 1 at the North American box office. It initially received negative reviews from critics, who lambasted its social commentary, writing, and acting; however, it later experienced a significantly more favorable critical reception. It is now regarded by many as one of Carpenter's best films. The film has also entered the pop culture lexicon, notably having a lasting effect on street art (particularly that of Shepard Fairey).

== Plot ==
"Nada" (Note: He is not given a name in dialogue, but referred to as this in the credits.) is a homeless man who comes to Los Angeles, California in pursuit of work, where he spots a preacher warning that "they" have recruited the rich and powerful to control humanity. He finds employment at a construction site and befriends his coworker Frank, who invites him to live in a shanty town near a church, where he meets their community leader, Gilbert.

A hacker takes over TV broadcasts, alerting that humanity is "their cattle" and the only way to unfold the truth is to shut off the signal at its source. Those watching the broadcast complain of headaches. Nada follows Gilbert and the preacher into the church, discovering a recording of gospel music playing that unbeknownst to Nada obscures a meeting with a group including the hacker. Nada also uncovers equipment and boxes inside, but escapes when he bumps into the preacher. The shantytown and church are destroyed in a police raid, and the hacker and preacher are brutalized by law enforcement officers.

Nada retrieves one of the boxes from the church and takes a pair of sunglasses from it, concealing the box in a trash pile. He finds out that they make the world appear monochrome and reveal subliminal messages in the media to consume and conform. They also disclose that many people are ghoulish, bug-eyed aliens hiding under human façades. Additionally, the creatures have wristwatch communicators that allow them to teleport, along with surveillance drones. When aliens at a supermarket realize that Nada can detect them, he is confronted by two alien police officers. He kills them, steals their guns, and enters a bank, where he sees that multiple employees and customers are aliens. He kills several and escapes by taking a human, Holly Thompson, hostage. Nada attempts to persuade her to put on the glasses, but she throws him out of a window. While speaking to the police, Holly realizes that Nada dropped his glasses on her carpet.

While Nada retrieves another pair of sunglasses from the trash pile, Frank comes to give him his paycheck and orders him to stay away following Nada's killing spree becoming widespread news. Realizing that Frank is not one of the aliens, Nada pleads with Frank to put on the glasses, but he refuses, and eventually the two come to blows. After a long and painful fight, Nada subdues Frank, and places the glasses on his face. Seeing the aliens for himself, and now believing Nada, Frank agrees to go into hiding together. The two run into Gilbert, who introduces them to the human resistance. They are given contact lenses to replace the sunglasses and learn about the aliens using global warming to xenoform Earth's atmosphere to be more like their homeworld's while depleting its resources for their own gain. They also learn that the aliens have been bribing human collaborators in exchange for wealth. Holly joins the meeting, bringing information about where the signal may be originating. Soon afterwards, the meeting is raided by police, with the majority of those present killed and the survivors scattered. Nada and Frank are cornered in an alley, but Frank activates an alien wristwatch, opening a portal to the aliens' spaceport on Earth under Cable 54, an alien-run news network.

Coming across a meeting of aliens and wealthy collaborators celebrating the defeat of the human resistance, they are approached by a drifter from the shanty town, now a collaborator. Mistaking them for new recruits, he gives the pair a tour of the facility, where the aliens broadcast a signal that prevents humans from identifying them and their hidden messages. Nada and Frank locate Holly and fight their way to the transmitter on the roof, but Holly reveals herself as a collaborator and murders Frank. Nada kills Holly and blasts the transmitter before police gun him down. As he dies giving the police the finger, humans discover the aliens among them and react in horror and disgust.

== Cast ==
- Roddy Piper as Nada
- Keith David as Frank Armitage
- Meg Foster as Holly Thompson
- Raymond St. Jacques as Street Preacher
- George Buck Flower as Drifter
- Peter Jason as Gilbert
- Sy Richardson as Black Revolutionary
- Susan Blanchard as Ingenue
- Norman Alden as Construction Foreman
- Norman D. Wilson as Newspaper Vendor
- Kerry Rossall as 2nd Unit Guard
- Jeff Imada as Male Ghoul

== Production ==
=== Development and writing ===
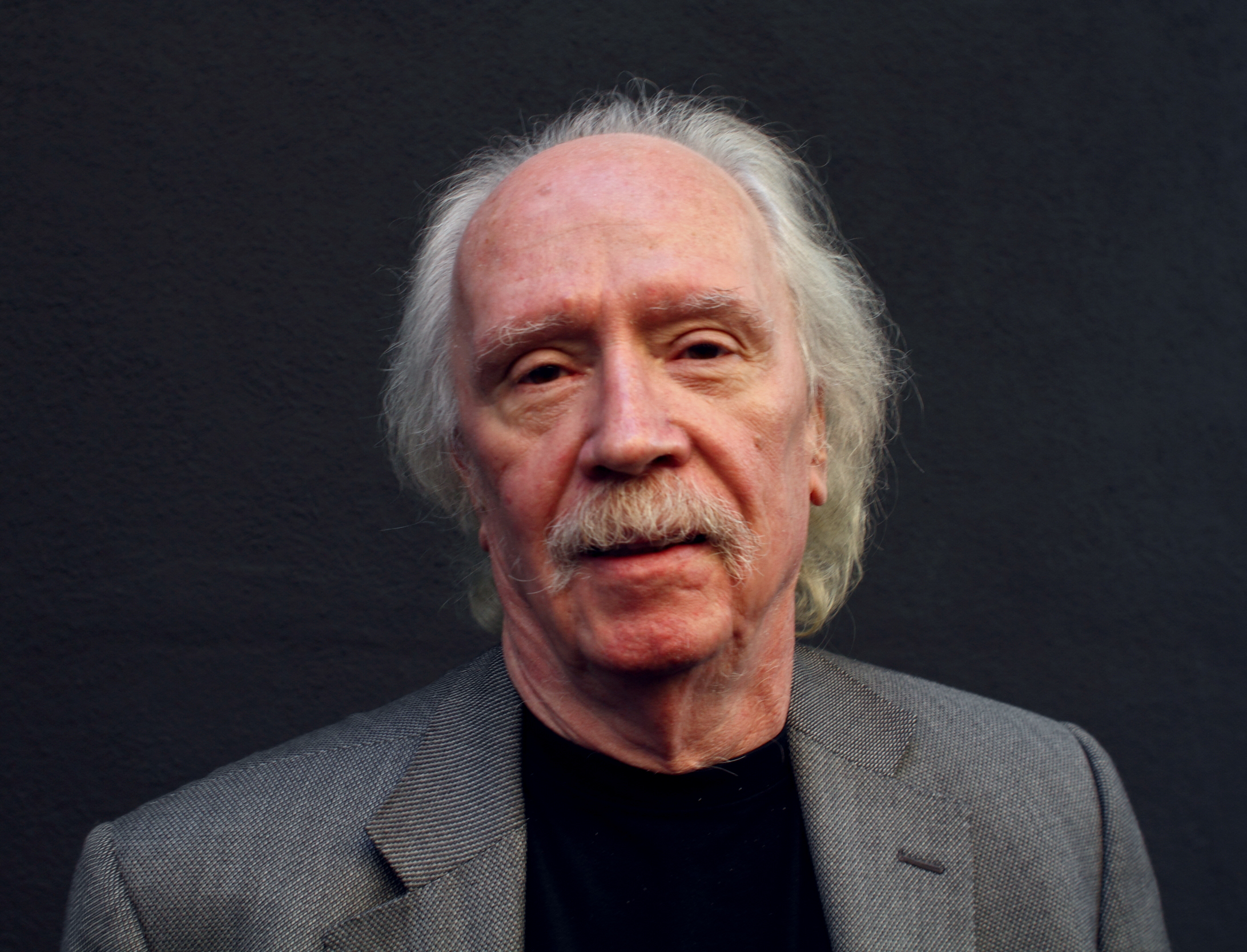
John Carpenter in 2010

The film was based on a short story by Ray Nelson titled "Eight O'Clock in the Morning" that appeared in the November 1963 issue of The Magazine of Fantasy & Science Fiction. A comics adaptation, titled "Nada" and illustrated by Bill Wray, appeared in the anthology comic book Alien Encounters in April 1986. Carpenter describes Nelson's story as "... a D.O.A.-type of story, in which a man is put in a trance by a stage hypnotist. When he awakens, he realizes that the entire human race has been hypnotized, and that alien creatures are controlling humanity. He has only until eight o'clock in the morning to solve the problem." Carpenter acquired the film rights to both the short story and the comics version.

As the screenplay was the product of so many sources (a short story, its comic version, and input from cast and crew), Carpenter decided to use the pseudonym "Frank Armitage", an allusion to one of the filmmaker's favorite writers, H. P. Lovecraft (Henry Armitage is a character in Lovecraft's The Dunwich Horror). Carpenter has always felt a close kinship with Lovecraft's worldview, and according to the director "Lovecraft wrote about the hidden world, the 'world underneath'. His stories were about gods who are repressed, who were once on Earth and are now coming back. The world underneath has a great deal to do with They Live."

=== Casting ===
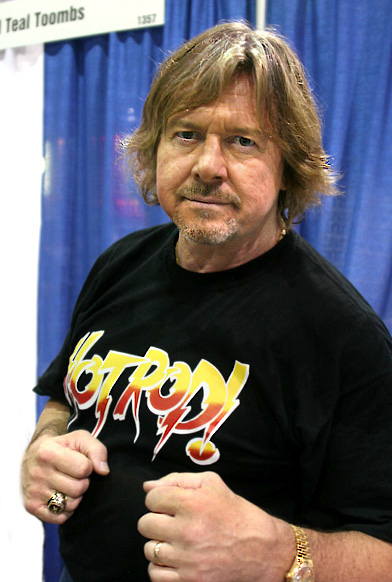
Roddy Piper (pictured in 2009) was cast for his 'everyman' look.

For the role of Nada, Carpenter was not looking for a traditional Hollywood leading man. He needed an "everyman" who looked like he had lived a hard life. Carpenter met professional wrestler Roddy Piper at WrestleMania III earlier in 1987 and was immediately convinced he was right for the part: "Unlike most Hollywood actors, Roddy has life written all over him. He has been hit so many times that he is really broken up. He even walks funny, because his pelvis was shattered and his back was wrenched. He is definitely not a pretty boy. He's the toughest guy I've met."

Carpenter was impressed with Keith David's performance in The Thing and needed someone "who wouldn't be a traditional sidekick but could hold his own." To this end, Carpenter wrote the role of Frank specifically for David.

=== Filming ===
They Live was shot in eight weeks during March and April 1988, principally on location in downtown Los Angeles, on a budget of approximately $4 million. Carpenter hired real homeless people as extras for the shantytown scenes, paying them with both food and wages. One of the most expensive shots was the opening train sequence, which cost $12,000 to film. A technical problem forced the crew to film it a second time at the same cost. The film was released in Europe under the title Invasion Los Angeles.

One of the highlights of the film is a five-and-a-half-minute alley fight between Nada and Frank over a pair of the special sunglasses. The original script only marked the scene with the words "They fight", leaving the choreography to the actors and stunt coordinator. The fight was inspired by the classic brawl between John Wayne and Victor McLaglen in the 1952 film The Quiet Man. The scene took a month to plan and three days to shoot. David recalls that the sequence "had a story within itself. It had a beginning, a middle, and an end."

=== Music ===
The music for the film was composed and performed by John Carpenter and Alan Howarth. The soundtrack was released in 1988 through Enigma Records.

== Themes ==
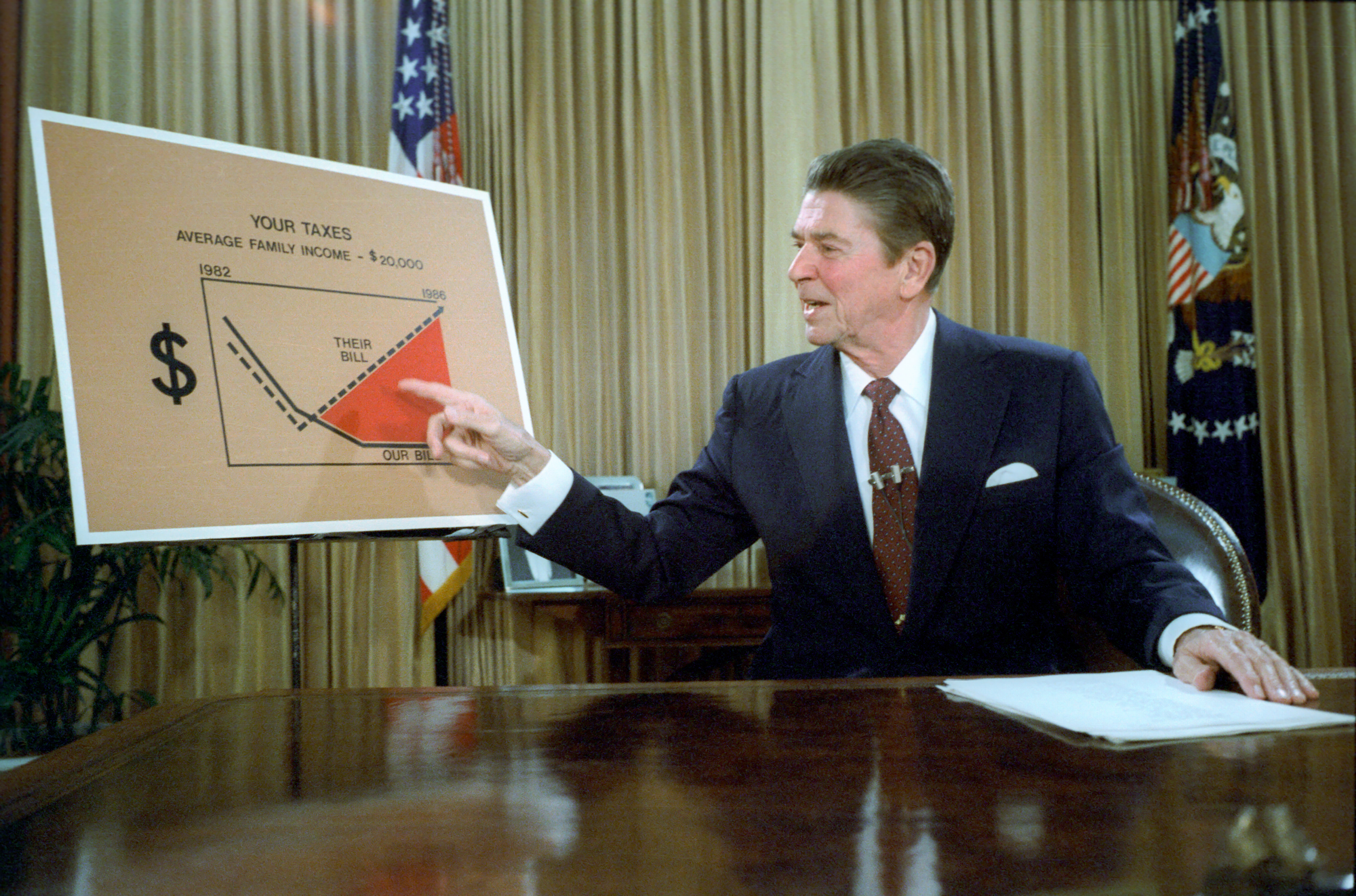
President Ronald Reagan addressing the nation in 1981 on tax reduction. They Live satirizes Reagan's political policies espousing limited regulation, supply-side economics and pro-business agenda.

Carpenter has said that the film's political commentary derives from his dissatisfaction with then–U.S. President Ronald Reagan's economic policies (known as Reaganomics) and what Carpenter viewed as increasing commercialization in both the popular culture and politics of the era.

In an interview given around the time of the film's release, Carpenter remarked, "The picture's premise is that the 'Reagan Revolution' is run by aliens from another galaxy. Free enterprisers from outer space have taken over the world and are exploiting Earth as if it's a third world planet. As soon as they exhaust all our resources, they'll move on to another world...I began watching TV again. I quickly realized that everything we see is designed to sell us something.... It's all about wanting us to buy something. The only thing they want to do is take our money." To this end, Carpenter thought of sunglasses as being the tool to seeing the truth, which "is seen in black and white. It's as if the aliens have colorized us. That means, of course, that Ted Turner is really a monster from outer space." (Note: Turner had received some bad press in the 1980s for colorizing classic black-and-white movies.) The director commented on the alien threat in an interview: "They want to own all our businesses. A Universal executive asked me, 'Where's the threat in that? We all sell out every day.' I ended up using that line in the film." The aliens were deliberately made to look like ghouls, according to Carpenter, who said, "The creatures are corrupting us, so they, themselves, are corruptions of human beings."

In another interview, Carpenter clarified that his criticisms of society and the film business contained in the film were not entirely serious. He stated in American Cinematographer, "I've made a lot of money in the film business the way it is run today, and I am a complete capitalist. I'm just advocating a little humanity in the world. In order to do that, you have to go strong in the other direction, be a little outrageous. It's fun to attack the status quo."

In 2017, in response to neo-Nazi interpretations of the film's themes, Carpenter further clarified that the film "is about yuppies and unrestrained capitalism" and "has nothing to do with Jewish control of the world." (Note: Attributed to multiple references:)

== Release ==
They Live was theatrically released in North America on November 4, 1988, and debuted at #1 at the box office, grossing $4.8 million during its opening weekend from 1,463 theaters. The film spent two weeks in the top ten. The film's original release date, advertised in promotional material as October 21, 1988, had been pushed back two weeks to avoid direct competition with Halloween 4: The Return of Michael Myers.

=== Home media ===
They Live was released on VHS by MCA Home Video in 1989. It was later released on DVD by Universal Studios Home Entertainment on October 17, 2000.

On March 2, 2012, the film was released on Blu-ray by StudioCanal. On November 6, 2012, Shout! Factory released a "Collector's Edition" of the film on both DVD and Blu-ray.

In 2014, Universal Pictures released They Live on DVD along with The Thing, Village of the Damned, and Virus as part of the 4 Movie Midnight Marathon Pack: Aliens.

On January 19, 2021, Shout! Factory released the "Collector's Edition" of the film on 4K Ultra HD Blu-ray.

== Reception ==
=== Critical response ===
On the review aggregator website Rotten Tomatoes, the film has an approval rating of 86% based on 76 reviews. The website's critical consensus reads: "A politically subversive blend of horror and sci fi, They Live is an underrated genre film from John Carpenter." Metacritic gives the film a weighted average rating of 55 out of 100 based on 22 reviews, indicating "mixed or average reviews".

In his review for the Chicago Reader, Jonathan Rosenbaum wrote, "Carpenter's wit and storytelling craft make this fun and watchable, although the script takes a number of unfortunate shortcuts, and the possibilities inherent in the movie's central concept are explored only cursorily." Jay Carr, writing for The Boston Globe, said "[o]nce Carpenter delivers his throwback-to-the-'50s visuals, complete with plump little B-movie flying saucers, and makes his point that the rich are fascist fiends, They Live starts running low on imagination and inventiveness", but felt that "as sci-fi horror comedy, They Live, with its wake-up call to the world, is in a class with Terminator and RoboCop, even though its hero doesn't sport bionic biceps".

In her review for The New York Times, Janet Maslin wrote, "Since Mr. Carpenter seems to be trying to make a real point here, the flatness of They Live is doubly disappointing. So is its crazy inconsistency, since the film stops trying to abide even by its own game plan after a while." Richard Harrington wrote in The Washington Post, "it's just John Carpenter as usual, trying to dig deep with a toy shovel. The plot for They Live is full of black holes, the acting is wretched, the effects are second-rate. In fact, the whole thing is so preposterous it makes V look like Masterpiece Theatre." Rick Groen, in The Globe and Mail, wrote, "the movie never gets beyond the pop Orwell premise. The social commentary wipes clean with a dry towelette – it's not intrusive and not pedantic, just lighter-than-air."

The 2012 documentary film The Pervert's Guide to Ideology, presented by the Slovene philosopher and psychoanalyst Slavoj Žižek, begins with an analysis of They Live. Žižek uses the film's concept of wearing special sunglasses that reveal truth to explain his definition of ideology. Žižek states:

They Live is definitely one of the forgotten masterpieces of the Hollywood Left. … The sunglasses function like a critique of ideology. They allow you to see the real message beneath all the propaganda, glitz, posters and so on. … When you put the sunglasses on, you see the dictatorship in democracy, the invisible order which sustains your apparent freedom.

=== Awards and honors ===
Award	Category	Nominee	Result
International Fantasy Film Award	Best Film	John Carpenter	Nominated
Saturn Award	Best Science Fiction Film	They Live	Nominated
Saturn Award	Best Music	John Carpenter, Alan Howarth	Nominated

== Legacy ==
They Live was ranked #18 on Entertainment Weekly magazine's "The Cult 25: The Essential Left-Field Movie Hits Since '83" list in 2008.

Rotten Tomatoes ranked the fight scene between Roddy Piper's character Nada and Keith David's character Frank Armitage seventh on their list of "The 20 Greatest Fight Scenes Ever". The fight scene influenced the 2008 film The Wrestler, whose director, Darren Aronofsky, interpreted the scene as a spoof. The fight scene was parodied by the TV show South Park in the episode "Cripple Fight". Shepard Fairey credits the film as a major source of inspiration, sharing a similar logo to his Andre the Giant Has a Posse campaign. "They Live was...the basis for my use of the word 'obey'", Fairey said. "The movie has a very strong message about the power of commercialism and the way that people are manipulated by advertising".

The 1991 video game The Simpsons: Bart vs. the Space Mutants features a reference to the movie. Bart uses special sunglasses to see a group of aliens who have invaded Springfield.

Novelist Jonathan Lethem called They Live one of his "favorite movies of the eighties, hands down". He said, "It's a great movie... Look at what it does to people, look at how it emboldens and provokes...It's disturbing and ridiculous and outrageous and uncomfortable, but I think it's the kind of great movie that doesn't really need defense, it just needs to be given the air". Lethem wrote a book-length homage to the movie for the Soft Skull Press Deep Focus series.

The 2013 video game Saints Row IV featured a parody of the film with Roddy Piper and Keith David voicing fictionalized versions of themselves in a recreation of the fight scene between Nada and Armitage.

Rock band Green Day paid homage to They Live in their music video for "Back in the USA" from the album Greatest Hits: God's Favorite Band. Similarly, punk band Anti-Flag used the film as inspiration for the music video for their song "The Disease". David Banner and 9th Wonder also used the film as the influence behind their 2010 video for "Slow Down".

Minnesota-based rapper P.O.S. incorporated footage from They Live into the music video for "Roddy Piper", a song from his 2017 album Chill, Dummy. Directed by Adam J. Dunn, the video digitally inserts P.O.S. into scenes from the film alongside Roddy Piper.

The protagonist of the 1996 video game Duke Nukem 3D drew inspiration from action film stars including Roddy Piper, Arnold Schwarzenegger, Sylvester Stallone, Kurt Russell and Bruce Campbell. Game co-creator George Broussard recalled that the developers watched They Live while writing Duke's dialogue, incorporating references to the film. Among these was a variation of Nada's famous line about chewing bubblegum and kicking ass.

In July 2018, the film was selected to be screened in the Venice Classics section at the 75th Venice International Film Festival.

=== "Bubblegum" Quote ===
The film is noted for a popular line spoken by Piper's character, Nada: "I have come here to chew bubble gum and kick ass. And I'm all out of bubble gum." The line, described as the film's most famous, was improvised by Piper on set. A similar phrase appeared in the 1973 film Five on the Black Hand Side where a character proclaims, "I ain't giving up nothing but bubblegum and hard times, and I'm fresh out of bubblegum."

== Possible sequels or remakes ==
In 1996, while promoting Escape from L.A., Carpenter revealed that he had always wanted to make a sequel to They Live as it is one of his favorite films, but was never able to get interest or financial backing for the project.

In 2010, a remake was stated as being in development with Carpenter in a producing role. In 2011, Matt Reeves signed on to direct and write the screenplay. The project eventually shifted away from being a direct remake of They Live, to a new adaptation of the original Ray Nelson story "8 O'Clock in the Morning" with the intent of abandoning the satirical and political elements of the movie.

In 2023, producer Sandy King hinted that discussions about expanding the They Live story into new formats were ongoing, though specifics remained undisclosed.

In 2024, filmmaker Jane Schoenbrun, director of I Saw the TV Glow, discussed an idea for a remake. Schoenbrun proposed inverting the film's premise, saying that humanity would know about and have resigned to the aliens and their rule over Earth, but have access to sunglasses that make their consumerist propaganda look more appealing. Schoenbrun described this as a reflection of perceived cultural resignation to systemic influences critiqued in Carpenter's work.

== See also ==
- List of cult films
