= Village of the Damned (1995 film) =

- Theatrical release poster
- Directed by: John Carpenter
- Screenplay by: David Himmelstein
- Based on: The Midwich Cuckoos by John Wyndham; Village of the Damned by; Stirling Silliphant; Wolf Rilla; George Barclay
- Produced by: Michael Preger; Sandy King
- Starring: Christopher Reeve; Kirstie Alley; Linda Kozlowski; Michael Paré
- Cinematography: Gary B. Kibbe
- Edited by: Edward A. Warschilka
- Music by: John Carpenter; Dave Davies
- Production company: Alphaville Films
- Distributed by: Universal Pictures
- Release date: April 28, 1995
- Running time: 98 minutes
- Country: United States
- Language: English
- Budget: $22 million
- Box office: $9.4 million (domestic)

Village of the Damned is a 1995 American science fiction horror film directed by John Carpenter, written by David Himmelstein, and starring Christopher Reeve, Kirstie Alley, Linda Kozlowski, and Michael Paré. It is based on the 1957 novel The Midwich Cuckoos by John Wyndham. The 1995 version is set in Northern California, whereas the book and original film are both set in England. The 1995 film was marketed with the tagline, "Beware the Children".

The film received negative reviews from critics and failed at the box office upon release. This was Reeve's last theatrically released film before he was paralyzed in an equestrian accident in May 1995.

== Plot ==
The people and animals of the sleepy fictional coastal town of Midwich in Marin County, California, fall asleep at a 10 AM "blackout" and regain consciousness at 4 PM. Following the blackout, ten women of child-bearing age mysteriously fall pregnant, including Melanie Roberts, who has never been sexually active, and Callie Blum, a married woman who has been celibate for a year due to her husband Ben being away for work in Tokyo. None of them seek abortions after having dreams, and all the babies are born the same night in a barn – five boys and five girls, though Melanie's daughter is stillborn due to umbilical cord asphyxia. The surviving children are healthy but have pale skin, white-blonde hair, cobalt eyes, and fierce intellect.

However, the children do not appear to possess a conscience or individual personalities. They display eerie psychic powers that can result in violent and deadly consequences whenever they experience pain or provocation. The children soon "pair off" like mates, except for David, whose intended mate was the stillborn girl. As a result, David is the outcast of the group. Although he retains some degree of psychic powers, he also has the ability to show human compassion. He talks to his mother, Jill McGowan, the school principal, and begins to understand his situation. The children's leader is Mara Chaffee, the daughter of the physician, Dr. Alan, and his wife, Barbara. As a baby, Mara used her powers to force Barbara to commit suicide by jumping off a cliff.

The children develop a bad reputation in town after causing several injurious and fatal "accidents" to townsfolk, and eventually move to their classroom at a local barn for survival. Local priest Father George attempts to shoot them, only for Mara to use her powers and force George to shoot himself. Soon, it is learned that there are other colonies of blackout children in foreign countries, but due to their inhuman nature, they were quickly eliminated, in some cases at the cost of destroying the entire town. One of the scientists, Dr. Susan Verner, is forced to show the children the well-preserved alien corpse of David's intended mate she secretly kept for research. The children force her to commit suicide with a scalpel. An angry mob gathers to attempt to kill the children, but their unsuccessful efforts lead Midwich into chaos, and the rest of the scientific team flees.

Alan devises a plan to detonate a bomb inside a briefcase in the children's classroom. By thinking of a brick wall, he is able to create a mental barrier and keep the presence of the bomb a secret from the children. Jill begs him to spare David because he is not like the others. Alan attempts to do this by asking David to leave to get his notebook from his car. The rest of the children begin to suspect that Alan is hiding something. Mara's true face shows through as she breaks through Alan's defenses, revealing the bomb. The other children look at the clock, and the bomb explodes, killing everyone inside, including Alan. Jill holds David outside during the explosion.

While driving, Jill tells David: "We'll go someplace where nobody knows who we are."

== Cast ==
- Christopher Reeve as Dr. Alan Chaffee, the town doctor
- Linda Kozlowski as Jill McGowan, the school principal, and a widow who becomes the mother of David
- Kirstie Alley as Dr. Susan Verner, an epidemiologist working for the federal government of the United States, who investigates the mass pregnancies
- Michael Paré as Frank McGowan, Jill's late husband
- Meredith Salenger as Melanie Roberts, a virgin whose baby is stillborn
- Mark Hamill as Reverend George, the town minister
- Pippa Pearthree as Sarah, Reverend George's wife
- Peter Jason as Ben Blum
- Constance Forslund as Callie Blum
- Karen Kahn as Barbara Chaffee, Dr. Chaffee's wife
- George Buck Flower as Carlton
- Squire Fridell as Sheriff

=== The Children ===
- Thomas Dekker as David McGowan, son of Jill McGowan
- Lindsey Haun as Mara Chaffee, daughter of Dr. Alan and Barbara Chaffee
- Cody Dorkin as Robert Roberts, brother of Melanie Roberts
- Trishalee Hardy as Julie Blum, daughter of Ben and Callie Blum
- Jessye Quarry as Dorothy
- Adam Robbins as Isaac, son of Reverend George and Sarah
- John Falk as Matt
- Renee Rene Simms as Casey
- Danielle Keaton as Lily

== Production ==
=== Development ===
According to John Carpenter, there had been attempts to remake Village of the Damned since Invasion of the Body Snatchers had been successfully remade in 1978. In 1981, Lawrence Bachmann, who was head of MGM-British Studios when the 1960 film was made, said he was going to remake the movie. "I couldn't really do the book properly then", he said. "Twenty years ago, you couldn't talk about abortion; censorship didn't even allow you to mention impregnation. This time, we'll do it right." The project wound up at Universal, who approached Carpenter to remake it. He said, "I thought, 'Sure, it's an obvious choice, it's easy, that's a pretty easy movie to make.'"

Carpenter saw the original when he was 12 "and it stuck in my mind for several reasons. The whole idea of a whole town blacking out was 'Wow!' Also, I somehow got this incredible crush on one of the girls in the original. She was the first love object I had; I wanted her to zap me and take me over and make me do whatever she wanted." He said, "I also knew exactly where to shoot it. I live up there, Inverness, California, and Point Reyes, where we shot The Fog in 1979. I have a house up there. It's paradise; you can stand anywhere, put the camera down and shoot, and you've got it, it's there. It's a small town, plus it's home; I get to shoot at home for a change. So off we went."

=== Script ===
Carpenter rewrote the script by David Himmelstein. "It's a truly great novel", he said. "It's funny but in all the drafts of the script I read everybody was trying to go in a different direction from the old picture and the novel. They avoided it being about an alien visitation, strangely. Come on, guys, we've got to tell the story now. It's there. So I went back to the original roots of it. Should be pretty good."

"You don't have to do much to the original, really", he said. "You've got to bring it up to date, humanize it a little and make the characters rich. When the original was made, you couldn't say the word pregnant on screen. So the birth scenes and the women weren't dealt with."

=== Shooting ===
Carpenter said his relationship with the studio was "a good marriage, because we all had the same goals in mind...we all knew what story we wanted to tell. I can't tell you how impressed I am with Universal; the way they treated me, you can't get better than that."

Unlike its predecessor, the film was shot in widescreen color. Lloyd Paseman of The Register-Guard said that the shooting in widescreen color and the fact that major actors such as Christopher Reeve, Mark Hamill and Kirstie Alley were a part of the film made it so that the film was "anything but cheap".

Additional graphic violence was added in the remake. The children cause one adult, Dr. Susan Verner (Alley) to kill herself by stabbing herself with a scalpel and another adult, Sarah (Pippa Pearthree), to immolate herself.

"It was fun to do a drama like Village, as opposed to In the Mouth of Madness, which had a little edge to it", said Carpenter. "This is more straight. This is more a baby-boomer, middle-class kind of a movie. There's nothing wrong with that; I just hadn't done one of those in a long time. If you make a movie over $10 million, you have got to try to reach out to the broadest audience you can find. If you make it under $10 million, you're able to make it more quirky, more daring, more subversive, if you want to use that word. That's the joy of low-budget filmmaking. You can be tough, you can be down, you can be all sorts of things that from a business standpoint you can't do when you get over a certain budget."

Charlotte Gravenor, the hairstylist, bleached the hair of the actors who played the children, and then applied white hairspray to their hair. This made them appear like aliens. Bruce Nicholson and Greg Nicotero applied a special effect where the eye pupil colors change when the children seize control of the adults. If the children applied moderate psychic powers, their pupils would have the appearance of being green or red, and the color became a bright white when they applied strong psychic powers.

== Reception ==
In addition to being a failure at the box office, the film received negative critical response. Based on 40 reviews collected by Rotten Tomatoes, Village of the Damned holds a 28% approval rating from critics. On Metacritic the film has a weighted average score of 41 out of 100 based on 14 critics, indicating "mixed or average" reviews. In 1996, the film was nominated at the 16th Golden Raspberry Awards for Worst Prequel, Remake, Rip-off or Sequel but lost to The Scarlet Letter.

Lloyd Paseman of The Register-Guard said that while the remake did not attempt to make Village of the Damned "something" that its predecessor was not, the film had "mediocre" dialogue and plot development. He gave it two stars out of four. Paseman also remarked that in this film Reeve made an "earnest" attempt, that Linda Kozlowski did the highest quality acting for the film, that Thomas Dekker was "credible", and that Hamill was "badly miscast". Janet Maslin of The New York Times was more enthusiastic, regarding it as "John Carpenter's best horror film in a long while". The remake was "mostly more sly than frightening ... restaging the original story with fresh enthusiasm and a nice modicum of new tricks."

In a 2011 interview, Carpenter described the film as a "contractual assignment" that he was "really not passionate about".

Audiences polled by CinemaScore gave the film an average grade of "C" on an A+ to F scale.

== In popular culture ==
The design of the characters in the music video for M83's "Midnight City" is based on the film.
