= Suburban Screams =

2023 American horror anthology television series

- Official release poster
- Genre: Documentary; Horror; True crime; Anthology
- Created by: Jordan Roberts
- Showrunner: Jordan Roberts
- Music by: John Carpenter
- Country of origin: United States
- Original language: English
- No. of seasons: 1
- No. of episodes: 6 (List of episodes)

Production
- Executive producers: John Carpenter; Jordan Roberts; Sandy King; Tony DiSanto; Andy Portnoy
- Production locations: Prague, Czech Republic
- Running time: 39–44 minutes
- Production companies: Storm King Productions; DIGA Studios

Original release
- Network: Peacock
- Release: October 13, 2023

Suburban Screams (titled onscreen as John Carpenter's Suburban Screams) is an American documentary horror true crime anthology television series created by Jordan Roberts. The series is executive produced by Roberts, John Carpenter, Sandy King, Tony DiSanto, and Andy Portnoy.

The series debuted on Peacock on October 13, 2023, with all six episodes released simultaneously.

== Cast ==
=== "Kelly" ===
- Maria Almeida as May
- Sean Brodeur as Joey
- Jenn Kirk as Ella
- Sára Korbelová as Kelly

=== "A Killer Comes Home" ===
- Will O'Donnell as David Cadogan
- Andrew Buzzeo as Rick MacLean

=== "House Next Door" ===
- Ryan Dean as Torrence
- Crispian Belfrage as Dr. Kennedy
- Amie Maria Gorham as Fiona
- Josephine Jewers as Lisa Kennedy

=== "Bunny Man" ===
- Tyra Larsson as Gina

=== "Cursed Neighborhood" ===
- Paul A Maynard as Brian Norwood
- Sarah Priddy as Carlette Norwood
- Sharon Hinds as Irma
- Grace Venus as Deidre
- Chloe Zeitounian as Stacy Jones

=== "Phone Stalker" ===
- Julie Stevens as Beth
- Alyssa Dillard as Colette
- Cherles Doherty as Ronnie
- Dale Edwards as Hugh
- Igor Nacik as Gary

== Production ==
In January 2023, John Carpenter confirmed that he was working on a new project, but refused to reveal any details, adding that it was "shrouded in total mystery, like Skull Island." In May 2023, the series was announced by Carpenter by revealing he directed an episode, via zoom calls, from his home in Los Angeles while filming occurred in Prague, Czech Republic. The series is Carpenter's first project he directed since The Ward (2010). Other episode directors include Michelle Latimer, Jan Pavlacky, and the series writer and showrunner Jordan Roberts. Roberts also served as an executive producer, alongside Carpenter, Sandy King, Tony DiSanto, Patrick Smith, and Andy Portnoy. Carpenter also served as the composer of the series' main theme.

== Episodes ==
No.	Title	Directed by	Written by	Original release date
1	"Kelly"	Jan Pavlacky	Jordan Roberts	October 13, 2023
Joey moves to the suburbs where he and his roommate play with a Ouija Board. Joey soon finds himself plagued by an obsession with helping a ghost named "Kelly", but he struggles to understand how. Over time, Joey becomes convinced that the spirit of Kelly Lynn Fitzpatrick has become attached to him and that he has to find her.
2	"A Killer Comes Home"	Jordan Roberts	Amanda Deibert & Jordan Roberts	October 13, 2023
After escaping from prison, convicted killer Allan Legere returns to his suburban neighborhood of Chatham, New Brunswick where he continues killing. The local newspaper follows closely while the police attempt to track Legere before he kills again.
3	"House Next Door"	Michelle Latimer	Zack Kahn	October 13, 2023
When Torrence moves to Jamul, California, he feels that there is something wrong with the house next door. After he grows to be best friends with the girl living there, she and her family vanish. Years later, a new family moves in. Torrence falls in love with his new neighbor, Lisa, but fears for her safety. Soon, it becomes clear that something sinister is happening again in the house next door.
4	"Bunny Man"	Jan Pavlacky	Zack Kahn	October 13, 2023
Various accounts from interviewees about the urban legend of the Bunny Man in Fairfax County, Virginia, a suburb of Washington, D.C.. A hundred years ago, an isolated farmer in Virginia was arrested for theft, but he escaped from jail. He vowed to take revenge on the town, so he returned and lived in the woods by hunting rabbits. He dressed in rabbit fur and hung the carcasses as a warning to stay away. One night, he was chased onto train tracks and killed, but the next morning three children went missing. They were found hanging with the rabbits. In the 1970s, there were several sightings of a man wearing a rabbit mask and wielding an axe or hatchet, spreading fear of the Bunny Man across the county.
5	"Cursed Neighborhood"	Michelle Latimer	Amanda Deibert	October 13, 2023
In 1682, in what will become Charles County, Maryland, a group of white settlers is killed by Algonquian warriors. As the last man dies, he swears he will never yield the land God has given him. Four hundred years later, the Norwood family moves to the suburbs. They learn that there has been a series of mysterious crimes and deaths on their new street. As the Norwoods, encounter various supernatural incidents that threaten to break their family, it becomes clear that something does not want them here.
6	"Phone Stalker"	John Carpenter	Amanda Deibert	October 13, 2023
Beth moves to Holtsville, Long Island, but after breaking off her engagement she is living alone and soon receives a criminally threatening phone call. The harassment gets worse quickly as a cyberstalker torments Beth, ruining her relationships and psychological wellbeing.

== Release ==
John Carpenter's Suburban Screams debuted on Peacock on October 13, 2023, with all six episodes released simultaneously.

== Reception ==
On the review aggregator website Rotten Tomatoes, 3 of 17 (18%) critics' reviews are positive, with a critics consensus of: "Even with the welcome return of the Master of Horror, Suburban Screams is muffled by rather pedestrian execution". Metacritic, which uses a weighted average, assigned a score of 30 out of 100 based on 8 critics, indicating "Generally Unfavorable" reviews.

Aramide Tinubu of Variety gave a negative review, concluding that "unfortunately, instead of the sinister narratives that fans have come to expect from Carpenter, this series is a cheap display of ghastly crimes." Katie Rife of IGN also gave a negative review, summarizing that the series "is a typical true crime series in every way, except for the participation of John Carpenter and his family. Their contributions are minimal enough, and halfhearted enough, to not make much of a difference, however." Brian Tallerico of RogerEbert.com simarily felt that the series "doesn't deserve [Carpenter]'s name". Daniel Fienberg of The Hollywood Reporter also commented on Carpenter's involvement with the series, elaborating that "without the attachment of Carpenter's name, Suburban Screams would just be negligible, but probably unreviewed. With his name, it's disappointingly negligible and here we are." In contrast, Bob Strauss at the San Francisco Chronicle wrote: "Suburban Screams may not be everything it's sold as, but it's something better: a collection of tales that transcend their sensationalistic origins by artful, sure-handed presentation."

== Future ==
In October 2023, executive producer Sandy King expressed interest in making further seasons, saying "I think that it would be really fun to see how deep we can go and how many weird things really happen".
