= Prince of Darkness (film) =

1987 film by John Carpenter

- Theatrical release poster
- Directed by: John Carpenter
- Written by: John Carpenter (Note: For the screenplay, Carpenter was credited by the pseudonym "Martin Quatermass".)
- Produced by: Larry J. Franco
- Starring: Donald Pleasence; Victor Wong; Jameson Parker; Lisa Blount
- Cinematography: Gary B. Kibbe
- Edited by: Steve Mirkovich
- Music by: John Carpenter; Alan Howarth
- Production companies: Alive Films; Larry Franco Productions
- Distributed by: Universal Pictures
- Release date: October 23, 1987
- Running time: 101 minutes
- Country: United States
- Language: English
- Budget: $3 million
- Box office: $14.2 million

Prince of Darkness is a 1987 American supernatural horror film written, directed, and co-scored by John Carpenter. Starring Donald Pleasence, Victor Wong, Jameson Parker, and Lisa Blount, the film follows a group of quantum physics students who assist a Catholic priest in investigating an ancient cylinder hidden beneath a Los Angeles monastery, only to discover it contains a sentient liquid embodiment of Satan. The cast includes several Carpenter collaborators, while musician Alice Cooper appears in a supporting role as one of the possessed homeless people. It is the second installment in Carpenter's unofficial "Apocalypse Trilogy", following The Thing (1982) and preceding In the Mouth of Madness (1994).

John Carpenter developed the film after researching theoretical physics and atomic theory, combining scientific concepts with religious horror. Produced on a budget of $3 million, Prince of Darkness was released by Universal Pictures on October 23, 1987, and grossed $14.2 million worldwide.

The film received mixed reviews from critics, who praised its "handful of chillingly clever ideas", but believed it did not emulate the same successful horror as Carpenter's previous films. It was nominated for the Saturn Award for Best Music and won the Critics Award at the Avoriaz Fantastic Film Festival. Like many of Carpenter's films, Prince of Darkness later developed a cult following.

== Plot ==
Centuries ago in the Middle East, the Brotherhood of Sleep—a secret order of the Catholic Church—discovered a massive cylinder containing a swirling green liquid. Hidden even from the Vatican, the relic was eventually moved to Los Angeles and guarded in secrecy. In the present day, the last surviving member of the order dies before warning the cardinal that "the sleeper awakens." A Catholic priest sent to examine his belongings recovers a key that leads him to the cylinder, concealed beneath Saint Goddard's monastery.

The priest enlists quantum physicist Professor Howard Birack to analyze the cylinder. Birack brings along his students: wise-cracking Walter Fong, demure Kelly; the highly-strung Susan Cabot; laid-back Mullins; and lovers Brian Marsh and Catherine Danforth, as well as scientists Calder, Lisa, Etchinson, Lomax, Wyndham, and Dr. Paul Leahy. The priest explains that the liquid's influence is growing and begs Birack to provide scientific proof of its nature to the public before it escapes. Soon after the team arrives, the monastery becomes encircled by increasingly hostile homeless people. Their analysis reveals that the cylinder is at least seven million years old, can only be opened from within, and contains a substance that is prebiotic yet evolving with intent, instead of decaying.

Translating the Brotherhood's ancient texts, Catherine finds references to advanced mathematics predating their known discovery, while Lisa uncovers claims that the cylinder holds Satan, the son of an ancient god who was banished to the dark side. The texts describe Jesus Christ as an extraterrestrial who tried to warn humanity of the cylinder's threat but was executed by those who deemed him insane and too powerful. Birack theorizes that Satan's father may be the Anti-God, an even more powerful being trapped in a parallel realm of anti-matter.

The liquid begins to exert its influence beyond its container, spraying into Susan's mouth and possessing her. She in turn infects or kills other members of the team, while anyone who tries to leave is slaughtered by the enthralled homeless. The survivors realize that, since their arrival, they have experienced a shared dream of a shadowy figure emerging from the monastery. Brian surmises that the dreams are a warning sent from the future using tachyons. Meanwhile, the remaining liquid enters Kelly, transforming her into a monstrous vessel for Satan. Displaying telekinesis and rapid regeneration, Satan attempts to free the Anti-God by reaching through a handheld mirror, but it is too small and the effort fails.

The possessed attack the survivors, while Satan locates a larger mirror and reaches through, clasping the Anti-God's clawed hand. The priest attacks with an axe, but Satan instantly regenerates and resumes the summoning. Realizing the danger, Catherine tackles Satan into the portal, sacrificing herself. The priest shatters the mirror, sealing Satan, the Anti-God, and, to Brian's horror, Catherine on the other side. Instantly, the possessed die as the liquid evaporates, and the homeless disperse. Brian, Walter, Birack, and the priest are rescued as emergency crews arrive.

Later, Brian dreams once more, this time seeing Catherine as the dark figure emerging from the church. He awakens to find her disfigured body beside him, only to realize it was another nightmare. Shaken, he approaches his mirror, hesitantly reaching out toward its surface.

== Cast ==
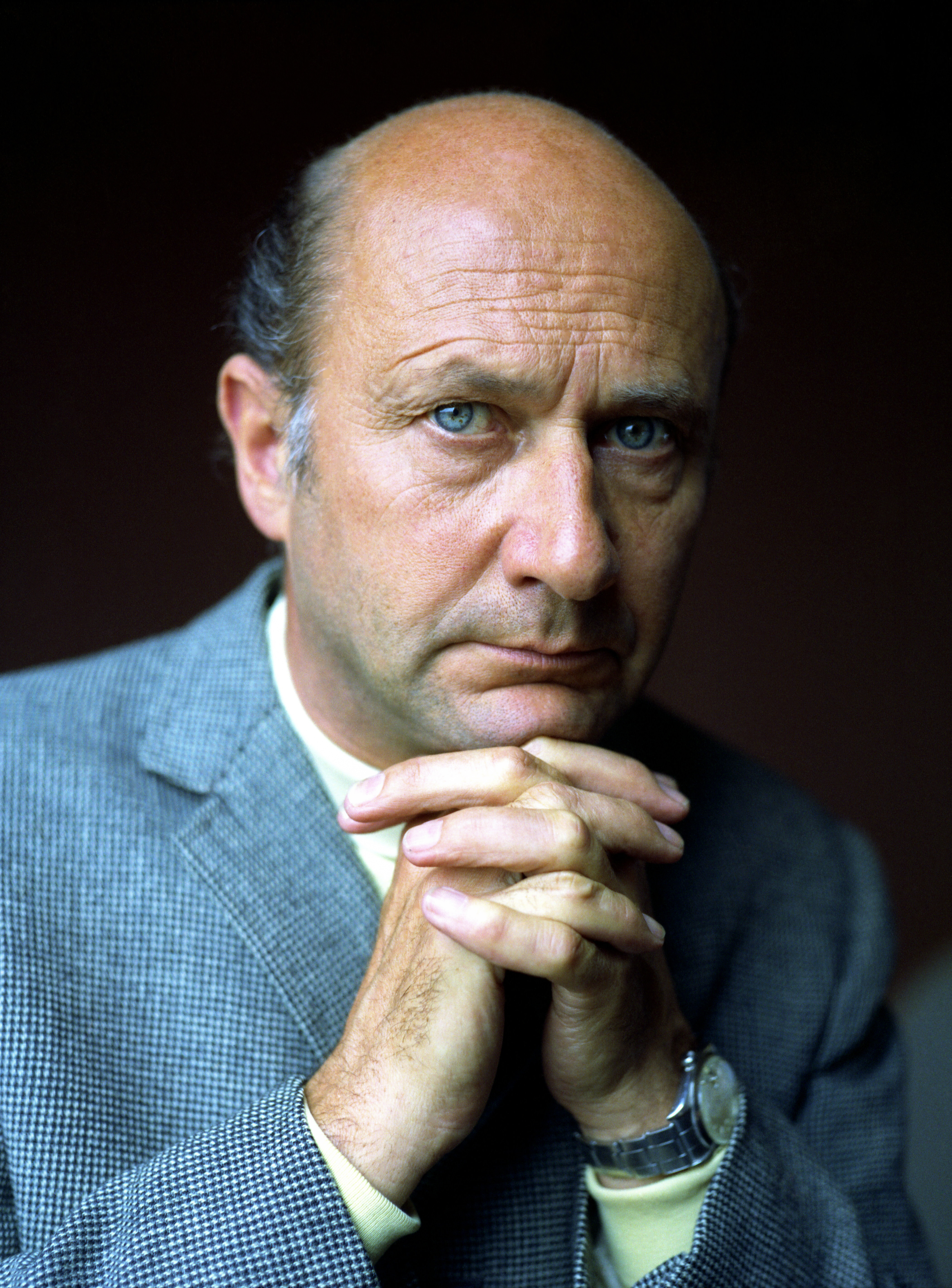
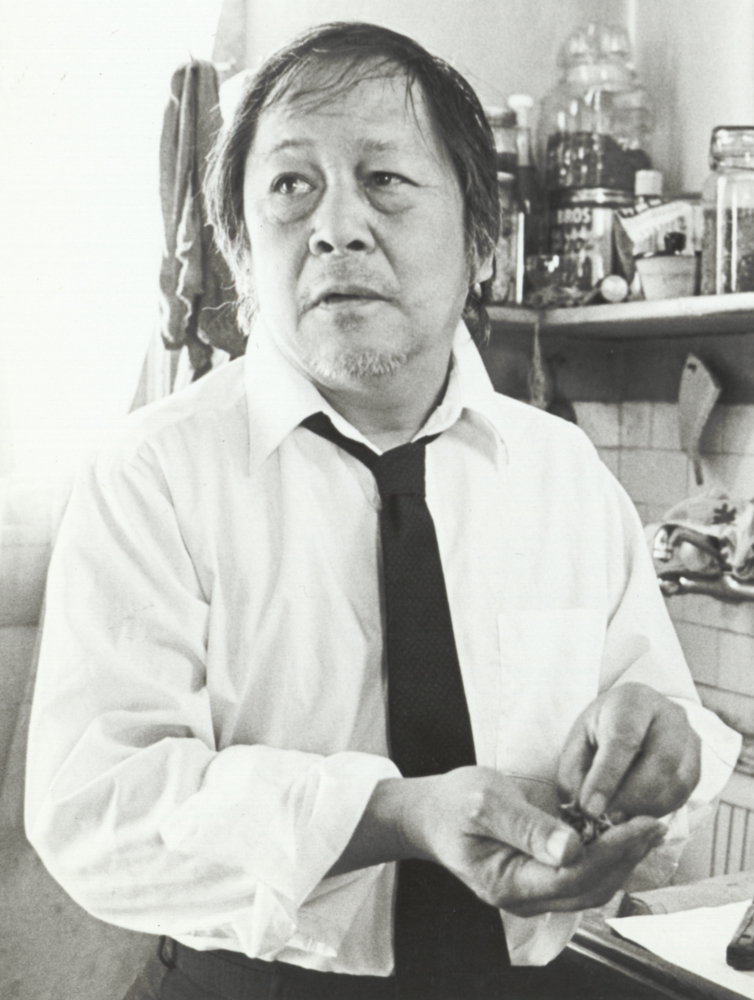
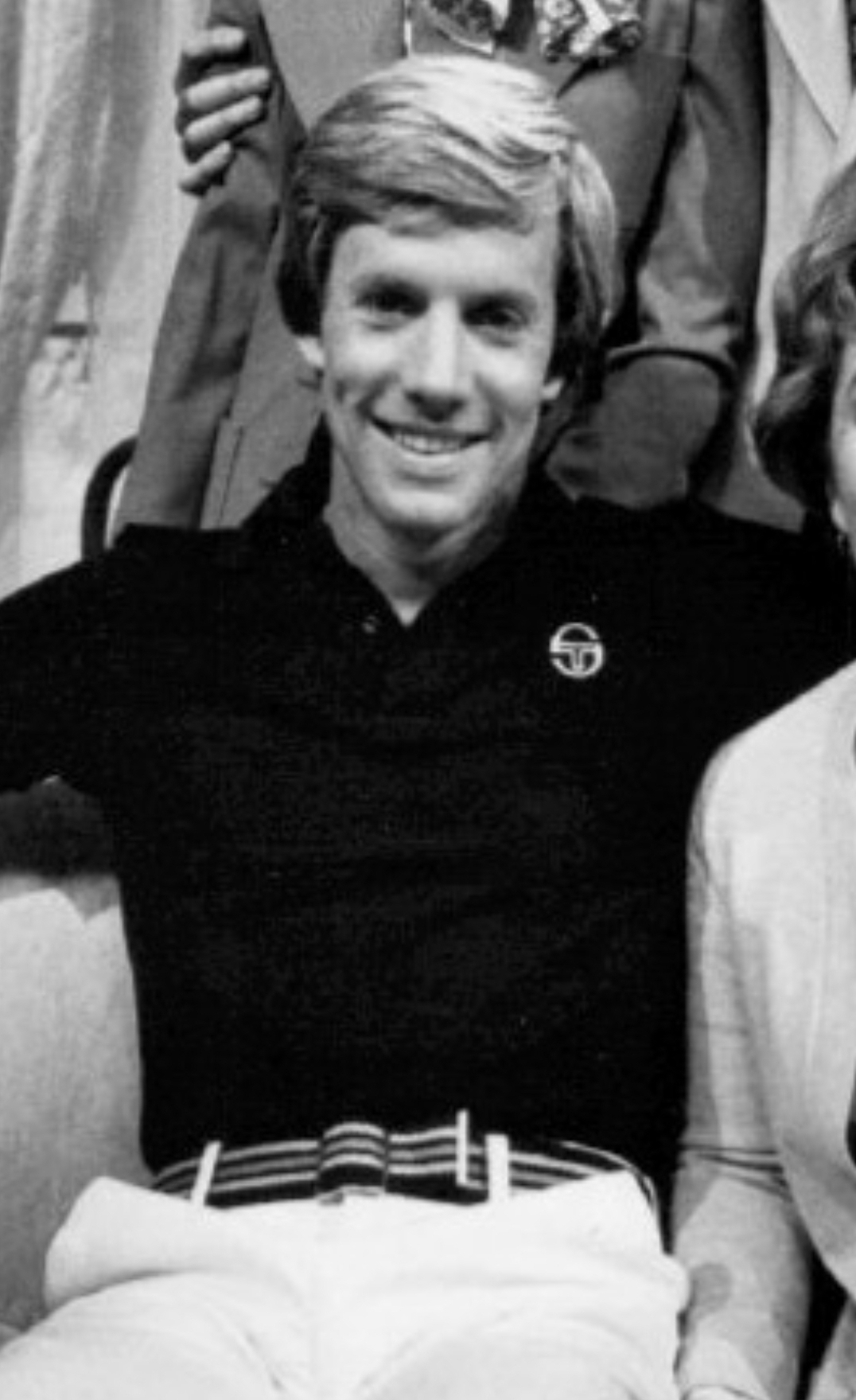
Donald Pleasence (pictured in 1973), Victor Wong (1983), and Jameson Parker (1977)
- Donald Pleasence as Priest
- Victor Wong as Professor Howard Birack
- Jameson Parker as Brian Marsh
- Lisa Blount as Catherine Danforth
- Dennis Dun as Walter Fong
- Susan Blanchard as Kelly
- Anne Howard as Susan Cabot
- Ann Yen as Lisa
- Ken Wright as Lomax
- Dirk Blocker as Mullins
- Jessie Lawrence Ferguson as Calder
- Peter Jason as Dr. Paul Leahy
- Robert Grasmere as Frank Wyndham
- Thom Bray as Etchinson
- Alice Cooper as Street Schizo

== Analysis ==
Film critic John Kenneth Muir suggests that Prince of Darkness serves as a parable for the AIDS epidemic that was at its peak during the time the film was made. Throughout the film, demonic possession is depicted as something that is transmitted like a communicable disease, via fluid passed between people. Muir goes on to note a number of references to homosexuality in the film, namely regarding the character of Walter, who makes several statements implying that he is gay (although he briefly flirted with Lisa, one of the female characters). In particular, Muir notes a sequence in which Walter, attacked by a number of possessed women while trapped inside a closet, emerges and flees. In addition to this, Muir writes that the film "pointedly asks some rather big questions about human nature, our existence, and the universe at large."

== Production ==
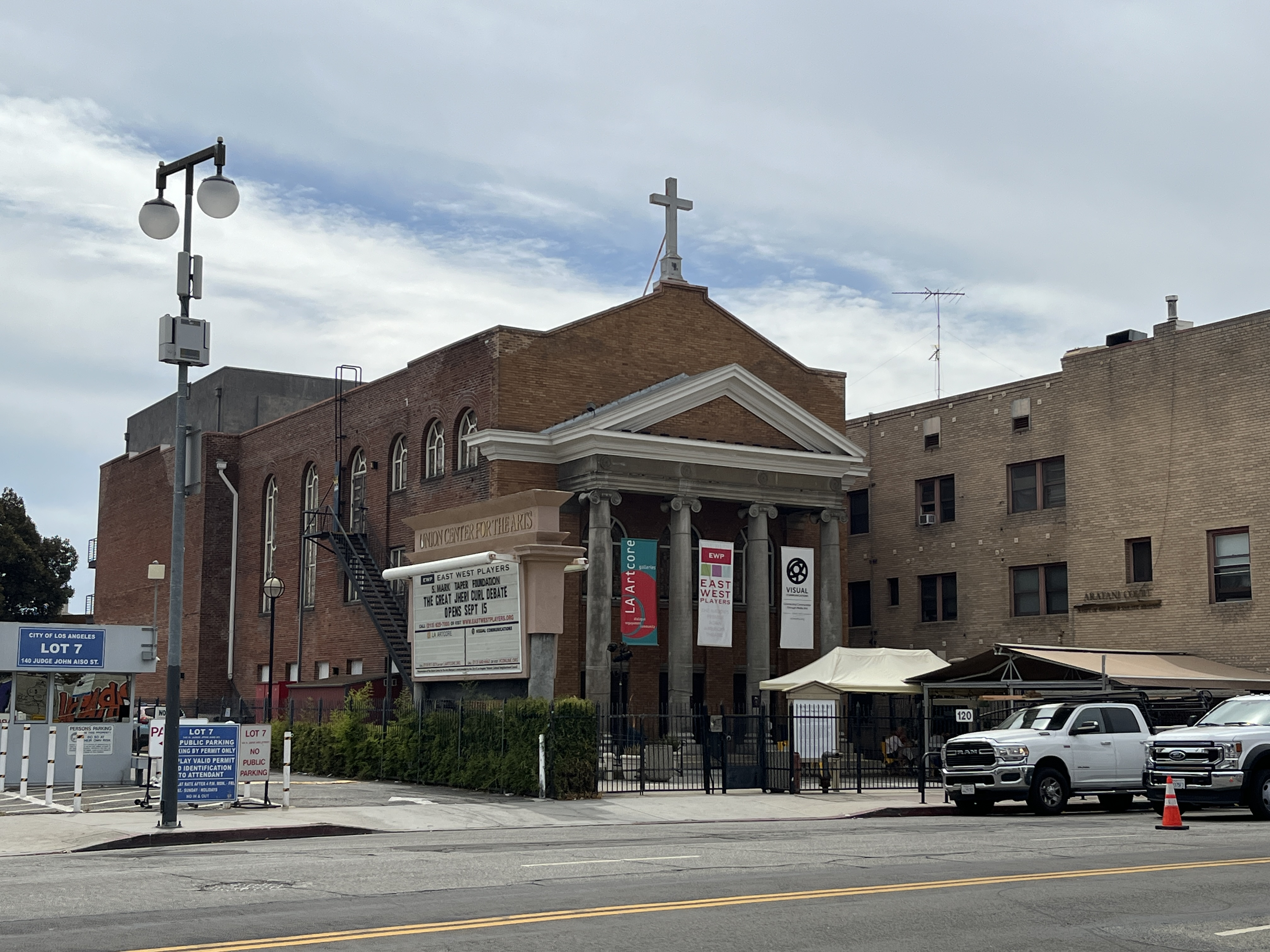
The building currently used by the Union Center for the Arts in Los Angeles served as the Saint Goddard monastery.

Prince of Darkness was shot in Los Angeles, California in 30 days. Carpenter became inspired while researching theoretical physics and atomic theory. He recalled, "I thought it would be interesting to create some sort of ultimate evil and combine it with the notion of matter and anti-matter." This idea, which would eventually develop into the screenplay for Prince of Darkness, was to be the first of a multi-picture deal with Alive Pictures, where Carpenter was allocated $3 million per picture and complete creative control.

Carpenter later described Prince of Darkness as his first return to independent filmmaking after working within the studio system. He cited Inferno (1980), directed by Dario Argento, as an inspiration, saying that Argento's willingness to allow imagination to drive the film encouraged him to take a similarly unrestricted approach.

Executive producer Shep Gordon was also manager to singer Alice Cooper and suggested Cooper record a song for the film. Carpenter also cast Cooper as one of the homeless zombies. Cooper allowed the "impaling device" from his stage show to be used in the film in the scene where Cooper's character kills Etchinson. The song "Prince of Darkness", written by Alice Cooper and Kane Roberts and performed by Cooper, can be heard briefly through Etchinson's headphones during the scene in which Cooper's character kills him.

Carpenter reunited with actors Victor Wong and Dennis Dun, who had previously appeared in Big Trouble in Little China (1986), and Donald Pleasence, who had starred in Halloween (1978) and Escape from New York (1981). The film marked Peter Jason's first collaboration with Carpenter, and he subsequently became a regular performer in the director's films. Jason recalled that Carpenter's wife, Sandy King, had recommended him for the role. Gary B. Kibbe served as cinematographer, beginning a long association with Carpenter. The film employed wide-angle anamorphic lenses, producing visible distortion that caused straight lines to appear curved.

Carpenter wrote the screenplay under the pseudonym "Martin Quatermass", a reference to Bernard Quatermass, the fictional scientist created by British television writer Nigel Kneale. In a 1987 interview with the Los Angeles Times, Carpenter confirmed that the pseudonym was intended as a tribute to Kneale, whom he described as a major influence on his career. The film contains another reference to Kneale through the fictional Kneale University, where Professor Birack teaches. Critics have also identified similarities between the film's combination of science and supernatural horror and Kneale's works, particularly Quatermass and the Pit, The Quatermass Conclusion and The Stone Tape.

The poster for Prince of Darkness was created and designed by Henry Rosenthal, who worked for print production vendor Rod Dyer. Post-production for Prince of Darkness took place at the Walt Disney Studios in Burbank, California.

In a November 2012 interview with Michael Doyle for Rue Morgue, Carpenter discussed the creation of the film's recurring dream sequences, which depict a shadowy figure portrayed by Jessie Lawrence Ferguson emerging from a church doorway. Carpenter explained that he initially filmed the sequence using a video camera before re-photographing the footage from a television screen to produce its distorted, disorienting appearance. Carpenter also provided the disembodied voice heard during the dream sequences.

== Release ==
=== Critical reception ===
On review aggregator Rotten Tomatoes, Prince of Darkness holds an approval rating of 60%, based on 48 reviews. Its consensus reads, "Prince of Darkness has a handful of chillingly clever ideas, but they aren't enough to put John Carpenter's return to horror at the same level as his classic earlier outings." On Metacritic, the film has a weighted average score of 50 out of 100, based on 10 critics, indicating "mixed or average reviews". Audiences polled by CinemaScore gave the film an average grade of "B" on an A+ to F scale.

In his review for the Washington Post, Richard Harrington wrote, “At one point Pleasence vows that 'it's a secret that can no longer be kept.' Here's another: 'The Prince of Darkness stinks.' It too deserves to be shut up in a canister for 7 million years". Liam Lacey, in his review for The Globe and Mail, wrote, “There is no character really worth caring about, no sympathy to any of these characters. The principal romantic couple, Jameson Parker and Lisa Blount, are unpleasant enough to create an unfortunate ambivalence about their eternal destinies”. In his review for the New York Times, Vincent Canby called the film a "surprisingly cheesy horror film to come from Mr. Carpenter, a director whose work is usually far more efficient and inventive." Nigel Floyd in Time Out gave a positive review of the film, calling Prince of Darkness "engrossing" and adding "the claustrophobic terror generated by fluid camerawork and striking angles" leads "to a heart-racing climax".

=== Box office ===
Prince of Darkness opened in second place at the United States box office on October 23, 1987, grossing $4.66 million from 1,239 theaters during its opening weekend. It ultimately grossed $14.18 million in the United States and Canada against a production budget of $3 million.

=== Accolades ===
In 1988, John Carpenter received a Saturn Award for Best Music nomination for his score to Prince of Darkness. The film also won the Critics Award at the 1988 Avoriaz Fantastic Film Festival.

=== Home media ===
In the United States, the film was available on VHS in 1988, on DVD in 1998, with another DVD release in 2003. On 24 September 2013, Scream Factory released Prince of Darkness on Blu-ray and DVD as a collector's edition, featuring new interviews with John Carpenter and Alice Cooper, audio commentary and other bonus material. Scream Factory subsequently released a 4K Ultra HD Blu-ray edition in North America on 19 January 2021, accompanied by a standard Blu-ray containing additional special features.

In the United Kingdom, the film was classified for home-video release in 1988 and released on DVD in 2002. StudioCanal released a 4K Ultra HD Blu-ray edition in November 2018, featuring a restoration from the original camera negative.

In Germany, a Blu-ray was released in 2013 after the film was removed from Germany's restricted-media index and reclassified for audiences aged 16 and over.

In Japan, the film was released in 2014 on Blu-ray with the original television broadcast Japanese-dubbed audio available. In Sweden, the film was released on Blu-ray in 2021 with a commentary track, interview with John Carpenter, image gallery, original trailers and radio advertisements. The release also included a 34-minute documentary, Malevolent: Unearthing John Carpenter's Prince of Darkness, featuring Alice Cooper and other contributors.

== Legacy ==
Like most of Carpenter's films, Prince of Darkness went on to have a cult following. In 2004, critic Jim Emerson included it among four "undervalued" horror films, praising its central concept and surreal imagery. Reviewing its 4K restoration in 2018, Phil Hoad of The Guardian described it as possibly Carpenter's most underrated film and praised its combination of supernatural horror and theoretical physics.

The film has also influenced later horror filmmakers. Steven Kostanski, co-director of The Void (2016), cited Hellbound: Hellraiser II and Prince of Darkness as influences on the film, saying that The Void sought to take elements of those films further with the filmmakers' own sensibilities. Co-director Jeremy Gillespie said that they were particularly influenced by the "vibe" of those films. Director Phillip Guzman cited Prince of Darkness as a major influence on his 2018 film Sleep No More, particularly its tone and its combination of a group of researchers, experimental science and supernatural horror.

Audio from the film's recurring dream transmissions has also been sampled in popular music. Marilyn Manson's cover of "Down in the Park" used dialogue from the film, while DJ Shadow incorporated the transmissions into several tracks on his 1996 album Endtroducing......

== Bibliography ==
- Boulenger, Gilles. John Carpenter Prince of Darkness. Los Angeles: Silman-James Press (2003). ISBN 1-879505-67-3.
- Doyle, Michael. "The Essence of Evil", Rue Morgue #128 (November 2012), p. 16-22.
- Muir, John Kenneth (2015). The Films of John Carpenter. Jefferson, North Carolina: McFarland. ISBN 978-0-786-49348-7.
- Powell, Anna (2004). ""Something Came Leaking Out": Carpenter's Unholy Abominations". In Conrich, Ian; Woods, David (eds.). The Cinema of John Carpenter: The Technique of Terror. London: Wallflower Press. pp. 140–159. ISBN 978-1-904-76414-4.
