= Peter Jason =

American actor (1944–2025)

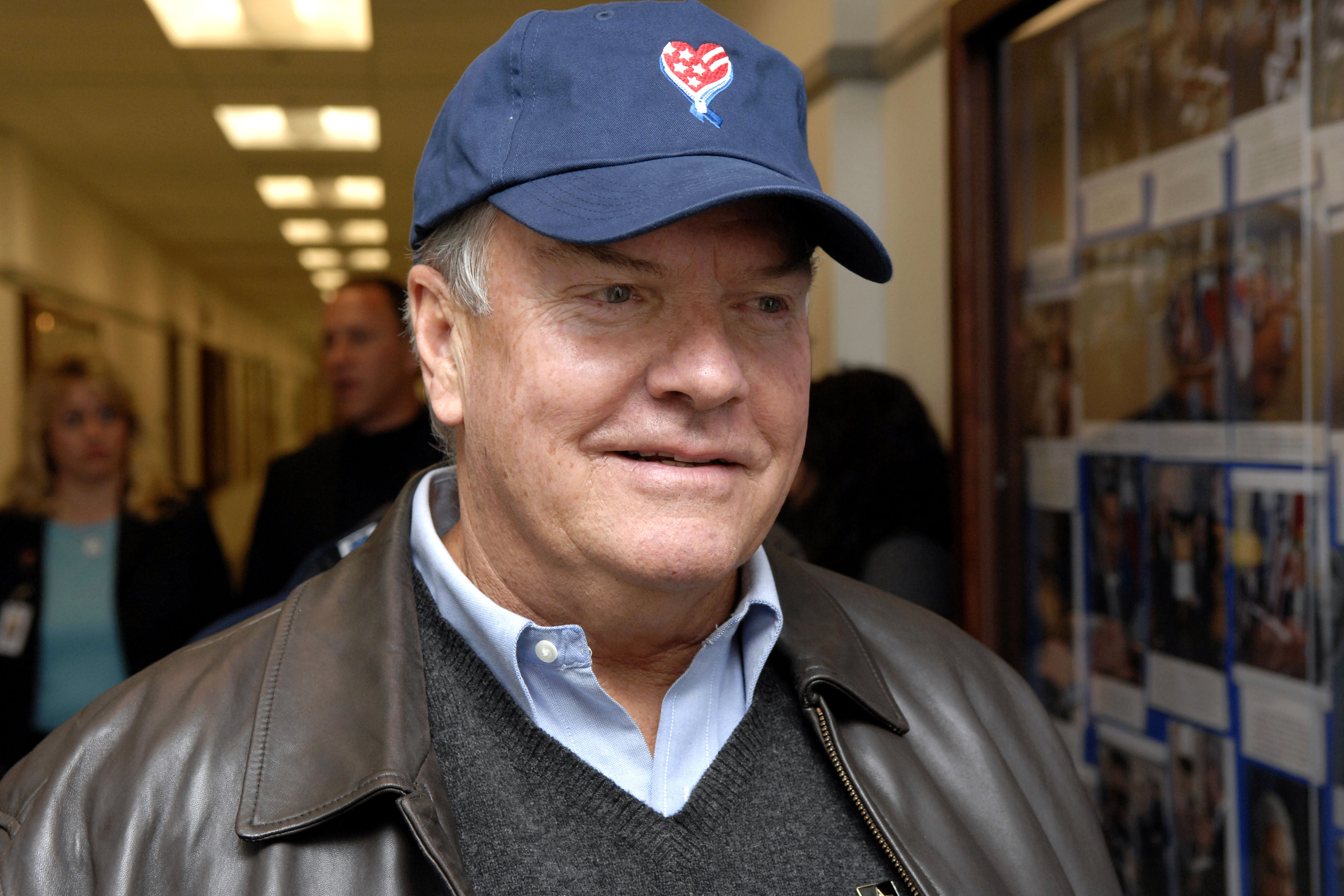
- Jason in 2006
- Born: Peter Edward Ostling; July 22, 1944; Los Angeles, California, U.S.
- Died: February 20, 2025 (aged 80); West Hollywood, California, U.S.
- Education: Orange Coast College; Carnegie Mellon University
- Occupation: Actor
- Years active: 1967–2025
- Spouse: Sally Ann Van Ameringen (m. 1966; div. 1968) Eileen Rosaly (m. 1979)
- Children: 2, including Robin Goldwasser
- Relatives: John Flansburgh (son-in-law)

Peter Edward Ostling (July 22, 1944 – February 20, 2025), known professionally as Peter Jason, was an American character actor. He appeared in over 250 film and television roles from his debut in 1967 through the mid-2020's, and was notably a regular in the films of directors Walter Hill and John Carpenter. He often played military personnel, law enforcement agents, and authority figures, as well as his portrayal as Con Stapleton on the television series Deadwood (2004–06, 2019).

== Early life and education ==
Born in the Hollywood neighborhood of Los Angeles, Jason grew up on the Balboa Peninsula, Newport Beach. Jason was a self-described "surf bum" until the age of 18, when he acted on stage for the first time and became "an actor bum." He had the lead role, playing Sheridan Whiteside in his high school's adaptation of The Man Who Came to Dinner. From there, he "never had a job, never worked for a living, just played for the rest of [his] life." He continued acting at Orange Coast College, citing his favorite role there as Harold Hill in The Music Man.

After hitchhiking to Pittsburgh for a stint at Carnegie Institute of Technology, along with work at the Paper Mill Playhouse and the American Conservatory Theater, Jason returned to California and helped to start the South Coast Repertory Theatre in his hometown. After an appearance on The Red Skelton Show, he joined AFTRA and soon after began work in film.

== Career ==
Jason had an extensive career, amassing over 250 credited roles in film, television and video games. His first credited role was as an unnamed duty officer in the 1967 TV movie A Bell for Adano, an adaptation of the 1944 novel by John Hersey. From there, he appeared in Here Come the Brides and three different roles on Gunsmoke. He also had a memorable turn in the 1970 Howard Hawks western film Rio Lobo as the doomed Lieutenant Forsythe, whose death spurred on John Wayne's Colonel Cord McNally to a mission of vengeance. He later played a Civil War soldier in the acclaimed miniseries The Blue and the Gray.

He continued to work steadily across the 1980s, appearing in The Karate Kid (1984) as a soccer coach, a supporting role in the Richard Pryor film Brewster's Millions (1985), and two roles in the Pierce Brosnan series Remington Steele. In 1982, Jason played the lead role of Malcolm O'Keefe, a deranged killer who terrorizes a young boy and his teenaged babysitter in the independent horror-slasher flick Trick or Treats.

Near the end of the decade would begin a fruitful working partnership with iconic horror director John Carpenter, with Jason appearing in seven of his films over the course of three decades. He first appeared in 1987's Prince of Darkness, followed by 1988's They Live, and later the likes of In the Mouth of Madness (1994), Village of the Damned (1995), and Escape from L.A. (1996). Additionally, Jason worked with Walter Hill nine times across his career, including playing the racist bartender in 48 Hrs. (1982) and an appearance in Red Heat (1988); he later cited the former as the role he was most recognized for outside of the television series Deadwood, for which Hill directed the pilot episode. In Deadwood, he played the dim-witted Con Stapleton over the course of all three seasons and thirty-three episodes from 2004 to 2006, as well as the 2019 reunion film. Stapleton, based in part on a real person of the same name who was the one and only City Marshal of the titular town, is depicted in the series as a card dealer at a saloon and later a reverend.

Jason's other work during the 1990s included a fan favorite appearance as Drill Sergeant Arch Dornan in the 1998 video game Fallout 2, a commander on the USS Reuben James in John McTiernan's 1990 adaptation of The Hunt for Red October, and a recurring role as Daniel Wilford in the Wing Commander franchise. He also appeared in the 1990 cult film Arachnophobia, the 1995 adaptation of Mortal Kombat, and in one of Meat Loaf's Bat Out of Hell II music videos directed by Michael Bay.

Jason continued to work steadily through the turn of the century, working across film, television and video games as well as appearing in various commercials. He had a small role in the 2003 Gary Ross film Seabiscuit and lent his voice to the animated spoof Hair High, written and directed by Bill Plympton. Jason also made two appearances on NCIS as Sergeant Major Robert King. In 2007, Jason received a CAMIE Award (Character and Morality in Entertainment Award) for his turn in the 2006 made-for-television Hallmark Channel film The Christmas Card.

Jason played Orson Welles in a 2014 short film as a tribute to the director; the two had previously worked together on Welles' last project, The Other Side of the Wind, which was eventually completed and released in 2018. He also played a director in the Coen brothers' Hail, Caesar! and appeared in Justified, and two roles in Arrested Development. In 2020, Jason was nominated for a Best Supporting Actor award at the Christian International Film Festival for his performance in the independent film Heavenly Deposit (2019). Additionally, he provided his voice to a number of video games, narrating Darkwatch: Curse of the West and playing Dizzy Wallin in Gears of War 2 and its sequel.

In 2022, Jason appeared in We Are Gathered Here Today, a movie filmed remotely over video calling services as a result of the COVID-19 pandemic, which it incorporated into its narrative. His last credited role before his death in February 2025 was in A Tale of 2 Fathers, a short film directed by Douglas Spain.

== Personal life ==
Jason was married twice. His first marriage, to Sally Ann van Ameringen, ended in divorce in 1968. He re-married to Eileen Rosaly in 1979, and they remained together until his death in 2025. He had two children from previous relationships, including singer and playwright Robin Goldwasser. Musician John Flansburgh, of the band They Might Be Giants, was his son-in-law.

=== Death ===
Jason died of cancer at his home in West Hollywood, California on February 20, 2025, at the age of 80. After his death, Billy Zane wrote that "my dear, dear friend, the brightest light, most generous soul and gregarious of men, the supremely talented and kind Peter Jason has left the set," while frequent collaborator John Carpenter stated that Jason was "one of the great character actors in cinema," adding that he was "a dear friend and I'll miss him terribly." Ed Asner's son Matthew noted that Jason was his father's "best friend," as well as "one of the sweetest people on the planet."
