= In the Mouth of Madness =

1994 film by John Carpenter

- Theatrical release poster
- Directed by: John Carpenter
- Written by: Michael De Luca
- Produced by: Sandy King
- Starring: Sam Neill; Julie Carmen; Jürgen Prochnow; Charlton Heston
- Cinematography: Gary B. Kibbe
- Edited by: Edward A. Warschilka
- Music by: John Carpenter; Jim Lang
- Distributed by: New Line Cinema
- Release dates: August 10, 1994 (Fantasy Filmfest); February 3, 1995 (United States)
- Running time: 95 minutes
- Country: United States
- Language: English
- Budget: $8 million
- Box office: $8.9 million (domestic)

In the Mouth of Madness is a 1994 American supernatural psychological horror film directed and scored by John Carpenter and written by Michael De Luca. It stars Sam Neill, Julie Carmen, Jürgen Prochnow, David Warner and Charlton Heston. Neill stars as John Trent, an insurance investigator who visits a small town while looking into the disappearance of a successful author of horror novels, and begins to question his sanity as the lines between reality and fiction seem to blur. Informally, the film is the third and final installment in what Carpenter refers to as his "Apocalypse Trilogy", preceded by The Thing (1982) and Prince of Darkness (1987).

In the Mouth of Madness pays tribute to the works of author H. P. Lovecraft in its exploration of insanity, and its title is derived from the Lovecraft novella At the Mountains of Madness. It premiered at the 1994 Fantasy Filmfest, and was released in theaters in the United States on February 3, 1995 by New Line Cinema. It received mixed reviews upon release, but has gained a cult following.

== Plot ==
John Trent is delivered by ambulance to an insane asylum, violently agitated and restrained. He is confined to a padded room, where he experiences disturbing hallucinations. He begins telling his story to a doctor.

Sometime earlier, while working as an insurance investigator in New York City, John meets with a client after uncovering a case of fraud, and he narrowly survives an attack by an axe-wielding man with misshapen pupils. Soon after, book publisher Arcane hires John to investigate the disappearance of acclaimed horror author Sutter Cane, whose next novel, In the Mouth of Madness, is eagerly awaited. Arcane's director, Jackson Harglow, informs John that the attacker was Cane's agent, though John suspects the whole affair is an elaborate publicity stunt.

John discovers that Cane's book covers form a map to Hobb's End, New Hampshire, the fictional town featured in Cane's stories. He and Linda Styles, Cane's editor, set out to find the location. During the drive, Linda experiences surreal phenomena, passing the same cyclist as both a youth and an old man, and even seeing the road vanish, before they abruptly arrive in Hobb's End. The town's landmarks and residents, including innkeeper Mrs. Pickman, appear exactly as Cane had written them. While John insists it is staged, Linda admits that although Cane's disappearance was a hoax, the current events are not. At a local church, described in Cane's novels as built on a site of ancient evil predating humanity, angry townspeople arrive demanding Cane return their missing children.

Back at the hotel, Linda insists events are unfolding as written in Cane's new book, which foretells the end of the world. She later confronts Cane at the church, where he reveals that while he once thought his stories were fiction, he now realizes that "they" have been guiding him all along. He exposes her to the unfinished manuscript, driving her insane. Disoriented, Linda returns to the hotel, where she transforms into a monster, as does Mrs. Pickman, forcing John to flee into a mob of mutated townsfolk. He seeks refuge in a bar, where a resident kills himself, claiming Cane wrote it that way. Attempting to escape, John repeatedly finds himself teleported back to the town center until, after crashing his car in frustration, he awakens inside the church, confronted by Cane and Linda.

Cane explains that the sheer number of readers who believe in his work has made his stories real, dissolving the boundary between fiction and reality and enabling the return of the "old ones". He tells John that Hobb's End and even John himself exist only because Cane wrote them, and that John must deliver the completed manuscript to Arcane. John rejects Cane's claims. Cane then tears himself apart, creating a portal through which the old ones emerge. John escapes through a tunnel, while Linda, who claims she already knows the ending, refuses to follow. Pursued by monstrous beings, John suddenly awakens on a country road.

John destroys the manuscript and returns to Arcane, but Jackson denies any knowledge of Linda and reveals that John delivered the manuscript months earlier. The book has already been published and a film adaptation is underway. Soon after, a disheveled John uses an axe to kill a Cane fan with mutated eyes.

John finishes telling his story to the doctor in the asylum, concluding that humanity will soon be reduced to a myth "they" will tell their children. That night, inhuman screams echo through the asylum. After his cell door bursts open, John discovers the facility deserted and hears a radio broadcast describing a worldwide epidemic of mass violence, mutations, and the fall of entire cities. Wandering into a cinema, he watches the film adaptation of In the Mouth of Madness. As the movie replays the events of his story—including him insisting "this is reality"—John breaks down in hysterical laughter.

== Cast ==
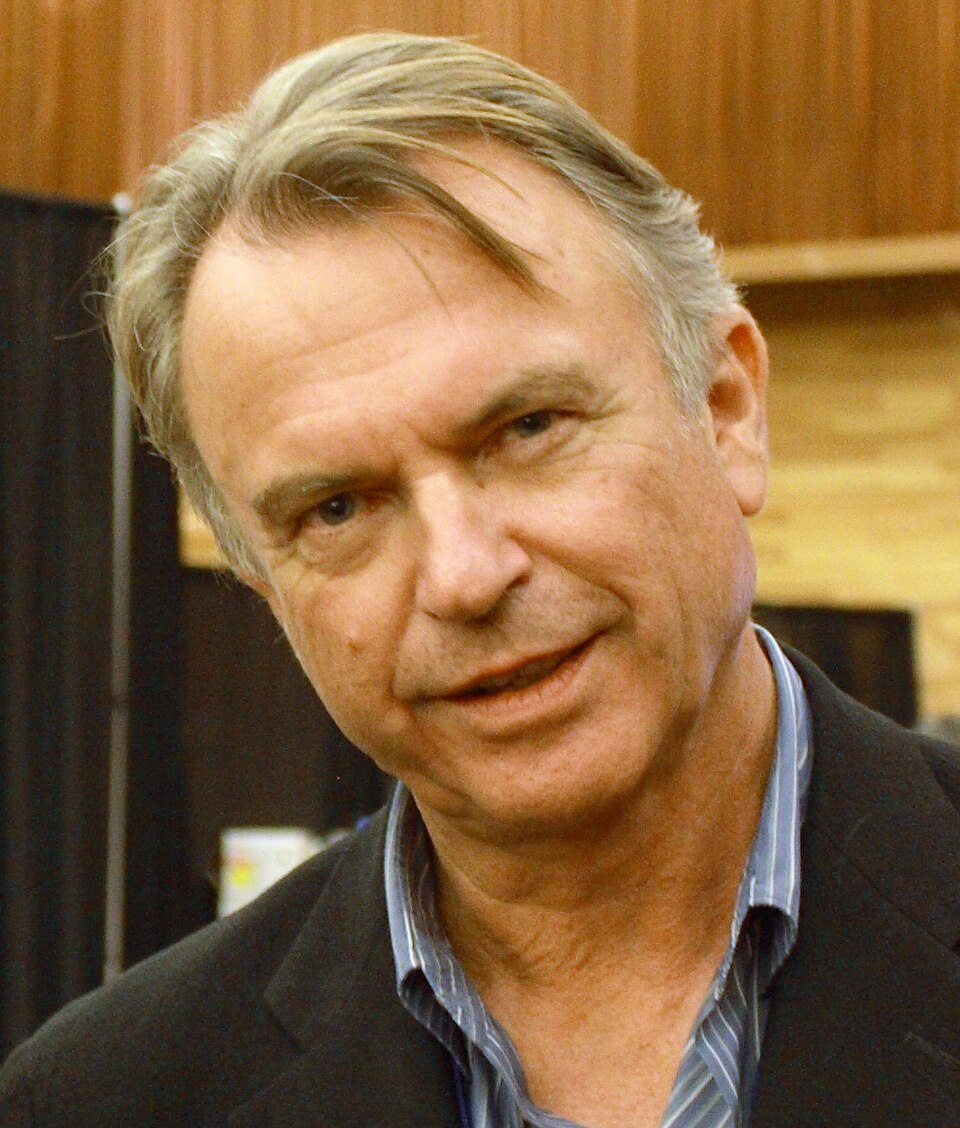
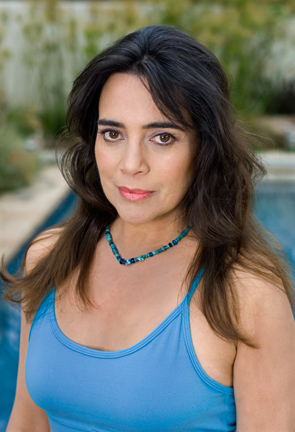
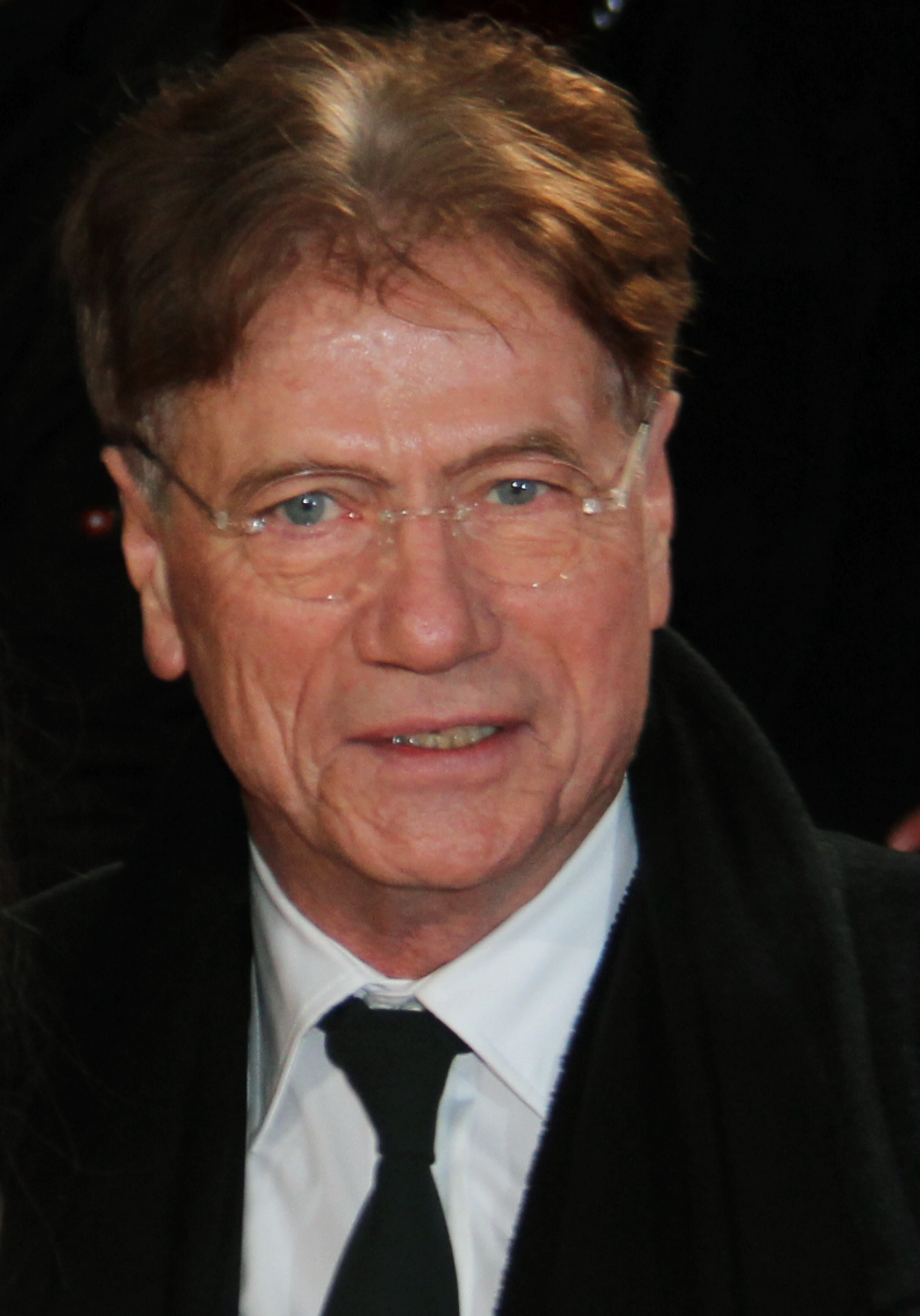
Sam Neill (pictured in 2010), Julie Carmen (2009), and Jürgen Prochnow (2012)
- Sam Neill as John Trent
- Julie Carmen as Linda Styles
- Jürgen Prochnow as Sutter Cane
- David Warner as Dr. Wrenn
- John Glover as Saperstein
- Bernie Casey as Robinson
- Peter Jason as Mr. Paul
- Charlton Heston as Jackson Harglow

In addition, Frances Bay plays Mrs. Pickman, while Wilhelm von Homburg appears as Simon. Hayden Christensen makes his film debut, briefly seen as a paper boy.

== Production ==
Michael De Luca wrote the script in the late 1980s and one of the first directors he offered it to was John Carpenter, who initially passed on the project. New Line Cinema later announced production in 1989 with director Tony Randel to direct. Later, Mary Lambert was also attached to direct. Finally, Carpenter signed on as director in December 1992, and filming took place from August to October 1993. The film had a budget of approximately $8 million.

The town scenes in Hobb's End were filmed on Main Street Unionville, and the exterior of the Black Church is actually the Cathedral of the Transfiguration. Both are located in Markham, Ontario. The rest of the film was shot on location in Toronto due to its unique mix of "New York skyscrapers and New England remoteness" according to Carpenter.

The visual effects for the film were done by Industrial Light & Magic, and the practical effects (including creature prosthetics and animatronics) were done by the KNB EFX Group. It took seven weeks for KNB to create all the practical effects for the film, the biggest of which was an "eighteen-foot Wall of Monsters" that was mounted on rollers and operated by a crew of twenty-five people. "We had under seven million [dollars] to spend on the picture", Carpenter said in 2001. "It was tough. The monsters had to be outrageous Lovecraftian demons, but in H.P. Lovecraft's novels, they are always so horrible that they are beyond description, that they are too terrifying to see. So how do you visualize something like that? Well, very, very quickly. They also had to be slightly cartoonish since Sam Neill spends most of the movie ridiculing horror only to discover it's all too real."

=== Influences ===
In the Mouth of Madness pays tribute to the work of seminal horror writer H. P. Lovecraft, with many references to his stories and themes. Carpenter later described the film as his attempt to create a successful cinematic treatment of H. P. Lovecraft's style of horror, saying that he felt no one had previously "really done a great Lovecraft story". Its title is a play on Lovecraft's novella, At the Mountains of Madness, and insanity plays as great a role in the film as it does in Lovecraft's fiction. The opening scene depicts Trent's confinement in an asylum, with the bulk of the story told in flashback, a common technique of Lovecraft. Reference is made to Lovecraftian settings and details (such as a character who shares the name of Lovecraft's Pickman family). Sutter Cane's novels have similar titles to H.P. Lovecraft stories: The Whisperer of the Dark (The Whisperer in Darkness), The Thing in the Basement (The Thing on the Doorstep), Haunter out of Time (The Haunter of the Dark/The Shadow Out of Time), and The Hobbs End Horror (The Dunwich Horror), the latter also referencing Hobbs End underground station from Nigel Kneale's Quatermass and the Pit.

The film also can be seen as referencing Stephen King, who, like Lovecraft, writes horror fiction set in New England hamlets. In fact, the characters even directly compare King (unfavorably) to Sutter Cane within the film itself. Linda Styles tells Trent early in the film, "You can forget about Stephen King, Cane outsells them all!"

=== Music ===
The film's main theme, heard during the opening credits, was inspired by the Metallica song "Enter Sandman". Carpenter had originally wanted to use the song, but was unable to secure the rights and instead composed his own theme, with the help of composer Jim Lang and guitarist Dave Davies of The Kinks.

== Release ==
=== Box office ===
In the Mouth of Madness premiered at Germany's Fantasy Filmfest on August 10, 1994 and was released in the United States on February 3, 1995. For its worldwide release, the film opened at the #4 spot and grossed $3,441,807 in 1,510 theaters in its first weekend. It fell to #7 in its second week before leaving the top 10 in week three. The film ended up grossing $8,924,549 on a budget ranging from $8 million to $14 million, making it a box-office failure.

=== Critical reception ===
On review aggregator Rotten Tomatoes, In the Mouth of Madness holds an approval rating of 63% based on 57 reviews, with an average rating of 5.9/10. The website's critical consensus reads, "If it fails to make the most of its intriguing premise, In the Mouth of Madness remains a decent enough diversion for horror fans and John Carpenter completists." On Metacritic the film has a weighted average score of 53 out of 100 based on 17 critics, indicating "mixed or average" reviews.

Critics generally commended the film on its technical aspects, particularly its special effects, acting, and directing, but perceived it as being too complicated, confusing, pretentious, and underwhelming. Roger Ebert gave the film two out of four stars, saying that the film has an intriguing premise, but squanders it by relying on hackneyed jump scares and gore, taking the form of "a horror house movie, in which the protagonists creep along while creatures leap at them." Writing for The Washington Post, Richard Harrington found the film's premise intriguing but criticised its erratic narrative, lack of genuine scares and failure to translate its imaginative concepts into effective horror. Anthony Lane of The New Yorker similarly expressed disappointment, arguing that Carpenter's exploration of the boundary between fiction and reality raised philosophical questions without making their answers particularly compelling. Lisa Schwarzbaum, writing in Entertainment Weekly, gave the film a C rating, remarking that "much of it [is] bloatedly self-indulgent and a small part wicked funny", with only a smattering of successful moments.

In fully positive reviews from the time period, Kevin Thomas of the Los Angeles Times called it "a thinking person's horror picture that dares to be as cerebral as it is visceral". John Hartl of the Seattle Times also gave the film a positive review, saying it is "a stylized collection of well-timed shockers, helped along by the contributions of its capable cast." Jonathan Rosenbaum ofThe Chicago Reader gave it three stars, calling it "a must see" and saying it may possibly be Carpenter's scariest film. In a later review, Chris Stuckmann also awarded the film with an "A," noting its ambition, creativity, and originality alongside Carpenter's direction. Reel Film Reviews gave the film three out of four stars.

French magazine Cahiers du Cinéma listed the film as #10 on its 1995 Top 10 List.

=== Novel adaptation ===
In 2025, Arcane Publishing released a novelization of In the Mouth of Madness under its imprint Echo On. Although the book is credited to the pseudonymous Sutter Cane, Echo On's chief editor Christian Francis wrote the novelization.

== Awards ==
Award	Category	Nominee(s)	Result
22nd Saturn Awards	Best Horror Film	In the Mouth of Madness	Nominated
22nd Saturn Awards	Best Make-Up	(K.N.B. EFX Group Inc.)	Nominated
Fantasporto	Critics' Award	John Carpenter	Won
Fantasporto	Best Film		Nominated

== Home media ==
The film was also released on LaserDisc during the 1990s, featuring an audio commentary by director John Carpenter and cinematographer Gary B. Kibbe, a making-of featurette, the theatrical trailer and television advertisements.

Following earlier VHS releases, In the Mouth of Madness was released on DVD by New Line in 2000, which included Carpenter's commentary with cinematographer Gary B. Kibbe, a 5.1 soundtrack and several foreign-language dubs. A Blu-ray version was in October 2013. In 2016, the Warner Archive Collection issued the film on DVD.

On 24 July 2018, Shout! Factory released a Collector's Edition Blu-ray under its Scream Factory label. The edition used a new 4K scan of the original film elements and included a newly recorded audio commentary with director John Carpenter and producer Sandy King, alongside interviews and archival material concerning the film's production and special effects.

In October 2025, Arrow Video released the film on 4K UHD, the first time the film had been released on that format. The new 4K restoration was based on the original 35 mm camera negative, presented in Dolby Vision with both the original stereo soundtrack and a 5.1 audio mix. The edition retained the Carpenter and King commentary and added new interviews and featurettes, alongside archival material from previous releases. The 4K UHD edition was released in the United Kingdom on 27 October 2025 and the United States on 28 October 2025. The limited collector's edition included newly recorded interviews with producer Sandy King and actor Jürgen Prochnow, a new audio commentary by filmmakers Rebekah McKendry and Elric Kane, and a collector's booklet containing six newly commissioned essays.

== Legacy ==
Despite its initially mixed reception, In the Mouth of Madness subsequently developed a cult following. In 2020, the British Film Institute included it among its "10 great Lovecraftian horror films", noting its increased following since its original release.

Film scholar Michael Blyth published a book-length study of the film in 2018, arguing for its critical re-evaluation and discussing its Lovecraftian influences, self-reflexive treatment of the horror genre and postmodern themes.
