= Catskill Escarpment =

Mountain range in New York, U.S.

- Great Wall of Manitou
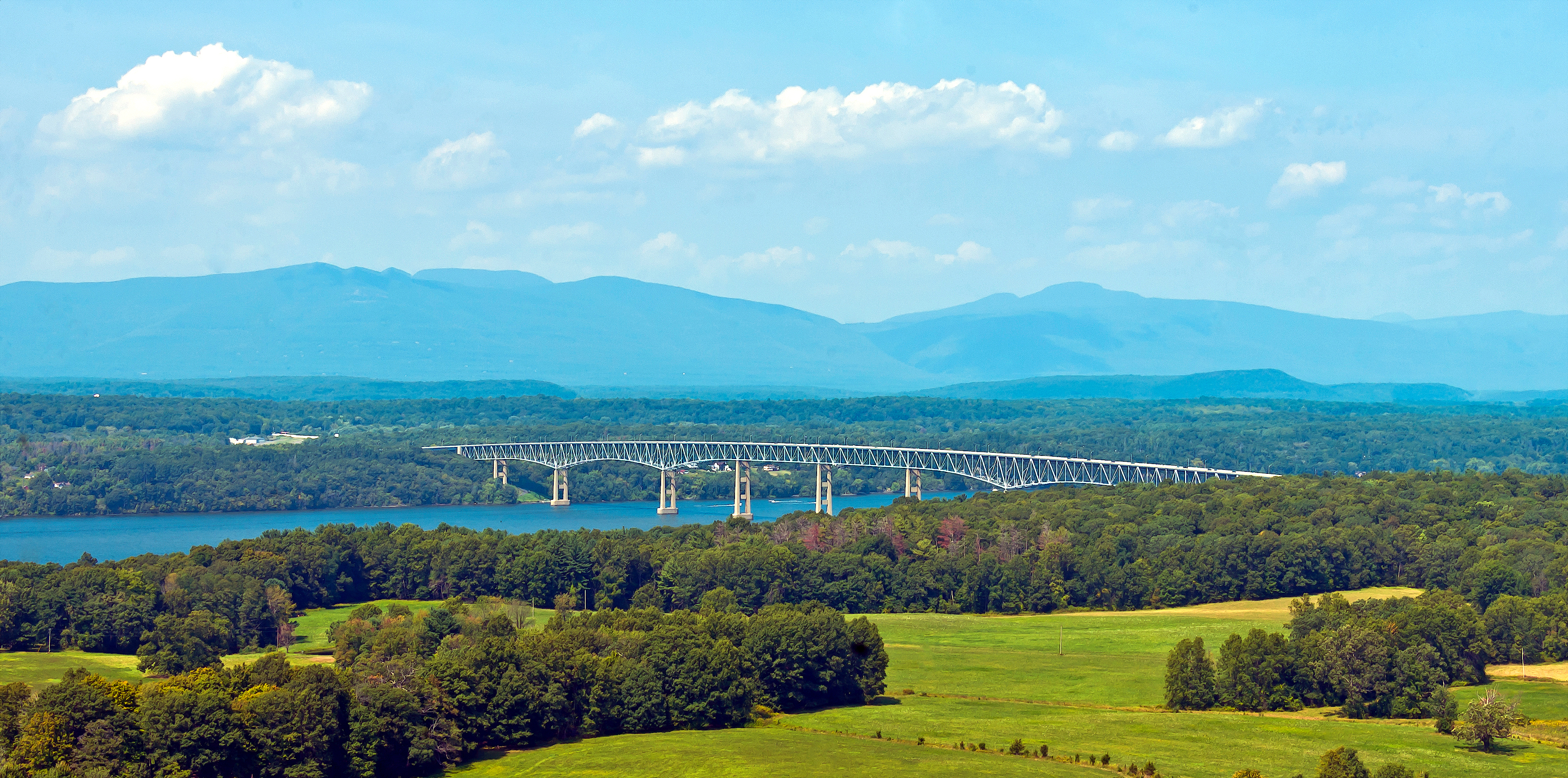
- The Escarpment as seen from Rhinebeck, across the Hudson River

Highest point
- Peak: Blackhead Mountain, Windham/Jewett/Cairo
- Elevation: 3,940 ft (1,200 m)
- Coordinates: 42°16′03″N 74°06′16″W

Geography
- Location within New York
- Country: United States
- State: New York
- Regions: Catskill Mountains and Hudson Valley
- Counties: Ulster, Greene and Schoharie
- Falls and lakes: Kaaterskill Falls and North-South Lake
- Parent range: Catskill Mountains
- Biome: temperate hardwood forest, boreal forest

Geology
- Orogeny: Acadian
- Rock ages: Silurian and Devonian
- Rock types: Shale and sandstone

The Catskill Escarpment, often referred to locally as just the Escarpment or the Great Wall of Manitou, and known as the Catskill Front to geologists, is the range forming the northeastern corner of the Catskill Mountains in Greene and Ulster counties in the U.S. state of New York. It rises very abruptly from the Hudson Valley to summits above 3,000 feet (910 m) in elevation, including three of the Catskill High Peaks, with almost no foothills. The plateau to the south and west averages 2,000 feet (610 m) above sea level.

The Escarpment was the first area of the Catskills to attract the interest of European settlers. Botanist John Bartram wrote a widely read account of an expedition there prior to independence, and a century later the North-South Lake area he had visited became home to a number of exclusive resorts, including the Catskill Mountain House. Views of it inspired Thomas Cole and other painters of the Hudson River School, the first art movement in the United States. Today much of it is New York State Forest Preserve within the Catskill Park, and a popular place for hiking, camping and other outdoor recreation.

== Geography ==
The Catskill Escarpment begins in the south at 3,140-foot (960 m) Overlook Mountain, just north of Woodstock. The graded trail to the summit and the 360-degree unobstructed view from the fire tower is a popular destination. The next mountain in the chain, directly to the north-northeast, is Plattekill Mountain, at 3,100 feet (940 m) dwarfed by its western neighbor, 3,573 ft (1,089 m) Indian Head Mountain, eastern end of the Devil's Path. To the north of Plattekill the ridge is broken by deep and narrow Platte Clove, the first of three breaks in the Escarpment. Just north of it the range crosses the Greene County line.

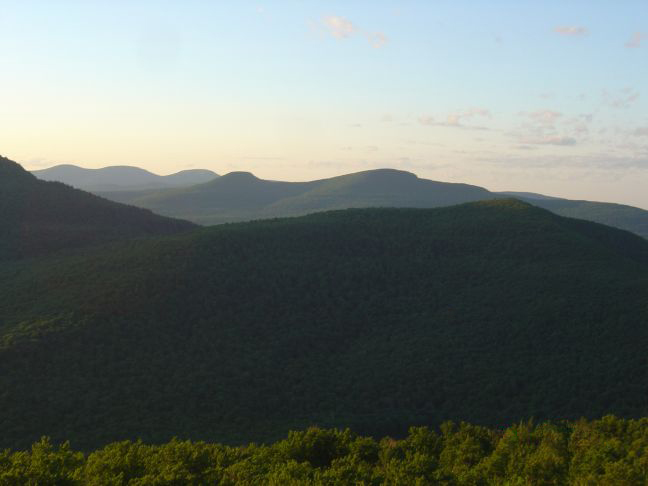
View from Overlook, showing (from right) Plattekill Mountain, Kaaterskill High Peak, and Blackhead Range

It rises again quickly to a high area around 3,655-foot (1,114 m) Kaaterskill High Peak, the easternmost Catskill High Peak and the first of three along the Escarpment. North of it the Escarpment is again breached by Kaaterskill Clove, the largest of its three breaks. It carries NY 23A through the Escarpment to the towns of Haines Falls, Tannersville and Hunter. Along its northern side is Kaaterskill Falls, one of the Catskills' oldest tourist attractions.

Above Kaaterskill Clove rises South Mountain, after which the ridge levels to North-South Lake, the former locale of the Catskill Mountain House and other resorts of the late 19th century. Today it is a busy public campground. North of it the ridge rises again to 3,180-foot (970 m) North Mountain, with the open views from North Point to its south one of the Catskills' most popular hikes.

Beyond North Point the Escarpment turns to the northwest. The land drops off slightly, then rises once again to Stoppel Point, 3,420 feet (1,040 m) in elevation. Then the Escarpment is broken once again by Dutcher or East Kill Notch, traversed only by an old road now used as a hiking trail. Another sharp rise leads up again to a ridge almost as high as Stoppel Point known unofficially as Arizona due to its dryness.

North of it rises Blackhead Mountain, the easternmost peak of the Blackhead Range and fifth highest in the Catskills overall. Its 3,940-foot (1,200 m) summit is the highest point along the Escarpment, visible with its neighbors from as far north as Albany. After its steep northern slope the range curves more sharply to the west. Minor peaks Burnt Knob and Acra Point form the northern wall of Big Hollow along with 3,523-foot (1,074 m) Windham High Peak, the last of the three High Peaks along the Escarpment and the mountain traditionally considered its northern end, as the lesser ranges to its west divide and do not rise as drastically as the Escarpment itself does from the nearby land.

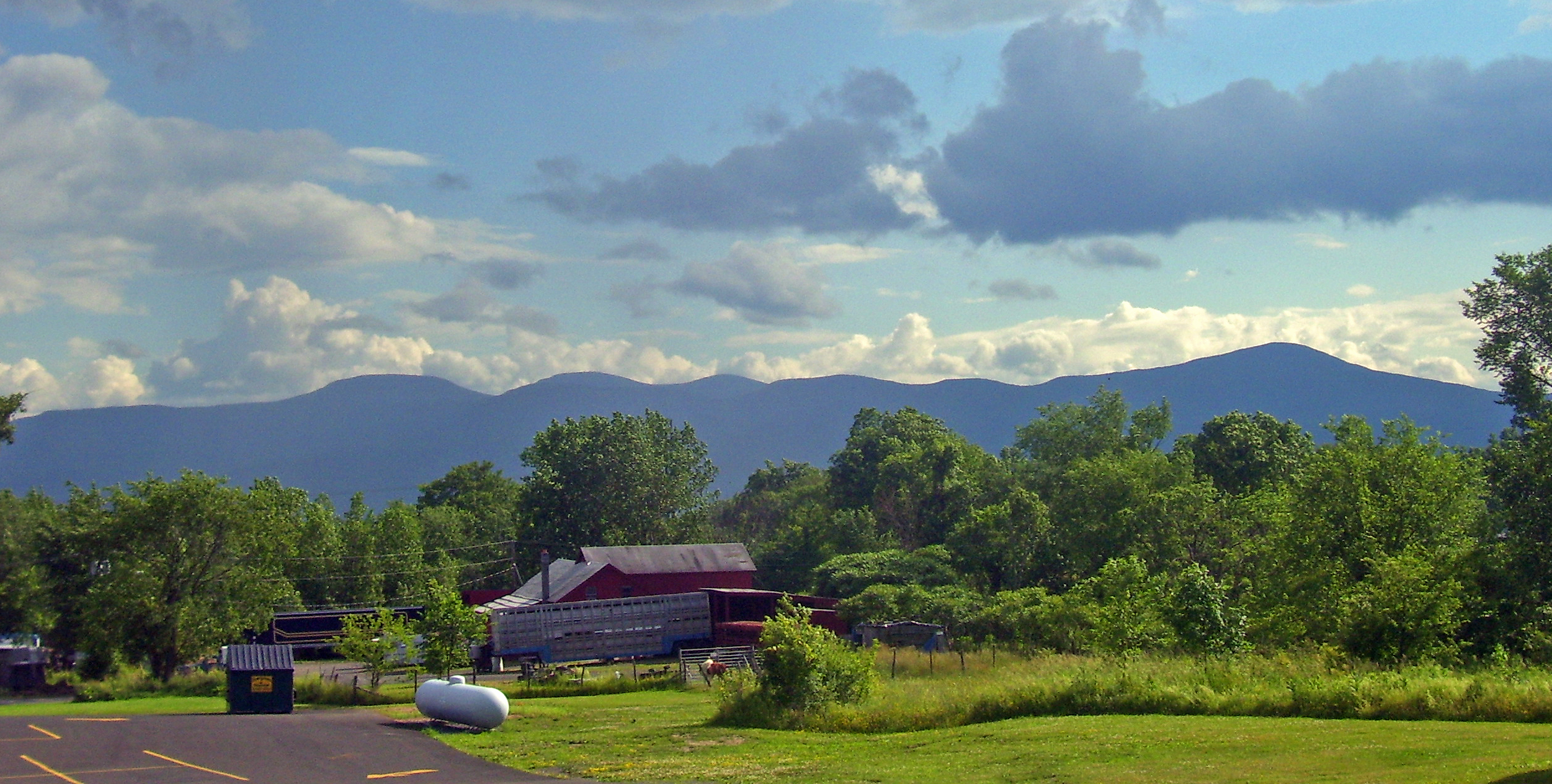
Northern Escarpment

Hydrologically, the entire Escarpment is within the Hudson River's drainage basin. To the east, Plattekill and Kaaterskill creeks drain the two cloves that share their names, and runoff from the ridge feeds Catskill Creek and other smaller tributaries of the Hudson in that area. To the west, with the exception of Kaaterskill High Peak, runoff feeds the headwaters and upper tributaries of Schoharie Creek, which rises at the height of land between Plattekill and Indian Head mountains. This makes them part of New York City's water supply due to the creek's impoundment at Schoharie Reservoir. Beyond there the Schoharie drains into the Mohawk and then back into the Hudson at Cohoes.

The Escarpment is considered the only place in the Catskills where the region's boundary is distinct and unambiguous. In other directions the slow descent of the mountains into the hills of the Allegheny Plateau leads to arbitrary delineations of the range's extent.

Due to its prominence, the Escarpment can be seen from a long distance around. It is a constant sight from not only the New York State Thruway in Greene County and the river but the Taconic State Parkway across the river and the mountains of western Connecticut and Massachusetts. From the Escarpment it is possible to see all those areas, plus Vermont, on a clear day. An overlook along Route 23 as it climbs the northern Escarpment is called Five State Lookout since New Hampshire's White Mountains are also visible.

Along the lower slopes, it forms part of the border between Ulster and Greene counties at its southern end. Within Greene County, it separates the towns of Catskill, Cairo and Durham on the lowland side from Hunter, Jewett and Windham in the mountains. The Catskill Park Blue Line also follows an irregular path along old property lines along its slopes from its southern end to the Route 23 junction, the northernmost point in the park.

== Natural history ==
The Escarpment owes its formation to three phases in different geological epochs. Two different processes shaped the range into what it is today.

Its limestone bedrock began forming 400 mya, during the Silurian period, when the Catskill region was a river delta and the shallow sea it drained into. The river carried eroded material from the Taconic Mountains to the northeast, then reaching as high as 15,000 feet (4,600 m) over present-day sea level. Later, during the Acadian orogeny, the sea became the deeper Appalachian Basin, and the sand and clay from the newer mountains became the shale and sandstone found throughout the Catskills today.

Eventually the sea floor itself began to drain and uplift. The area of today's Escarpment and northeastern Catskills had been the river's distributaries and had the thickest layer of Devonian sediments, leading it to uplift as a whole and become a plateau rather than fracturing into mountains. Gradually, the upper levels of the plateau began to erode and create stream basins, eventually becoming today's mountains and valleys

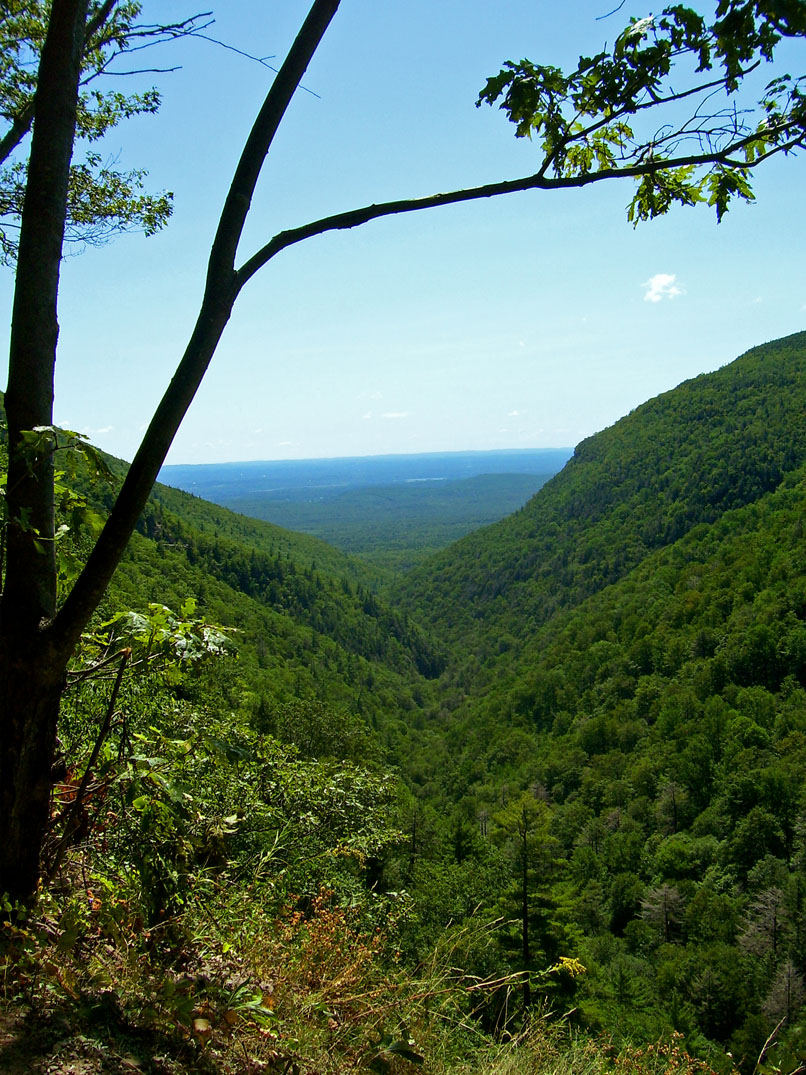
Platte Clove, carved out of the Escarpment by glaciers

The Escarpment of that time was more gradually sloped than it is now, with much loose rock from its uplift. Sometime between 100,000 and 300,000 years ago, the Illinoian glaciation swept through the region. This had two impacts on the Escarpment. Not only did it scour and steepen its slopes, leaving the many bare cliffs found today, it carved out both Platte and Kaaterskill cloves from the narrower, shorter and shallower valleys of smaller streams. In the latter, the gouge in the Escarpment was so deep it resulted in stream capture, as the outflow streams from North-South Lake, the headwaters of what would eventually be named Schoharie Creek instead flowed down into the new gorge. This both created Kaaterskill Falls, one of the Catskills' early tourist attractions, and relocated the source of the Schoharie to its present location.

As the Escarpment began to revegetate in the wake of the retreat of the Wisconsin glaciation, its forests remained exposed to weather due to their location. Lightning in particular caused many forest fires. Catskill forest historian Michael Kudish believes that the southern Escarpment "has been burned over many times, perhaps hundreds of times, during the last several thousand years".

== Human history ==
The history of the Escarpment is, in its early stages, the history of the Catskills, as the two were one and the same until modern surveying and science broadened the definition of the region in the late 19th century. No longer home to the Catskills' highest peak, the Escarpment became just the most visible of the Catskill ranges.

=== Native Americans and colonial era ===
The Munsee and Mahican tribes of Native Americans indigenous to the Hudson Valley did not live in the mountains, but settled heavily in the valley below. They went up the Escarpment only to hunt or start fires to nurture hunting grounds and provide defensive barriers against other tribes, or to follow trails to other communities on the far side of the mountains. While nothing has been recorded from the early years of contact with European settlers of what role the mountains above them played in their religious beliefs, it is very likely that they did, given their animistic traditions.

In 1609 Henry Hudson's Half Moon sailed up the river later named for him in search of a route to China. Its sailors became the first Europeans to see the Escarpment, and thus the Catskills. No one would explore them for a century, until Johannes Hardenbergh secured the 2 million-acre (810,000 ha) land grant that bore his name from colonial governor Lord Cornbury in 1708, a patent later affirmed by his cousin, Queen Anne. The language of the document specified that its northeastern corner was at a lake above the Escarpment believed to be the source of Kaaterskill Creek, later North-South Lake. The murky circumstances of the patent, likely involving official corruption, compounded by litigation from a competing group of claimants and interference with the crews attempting to survey the property limited efforts to explore or settle the Escarpment, much less the whole region.

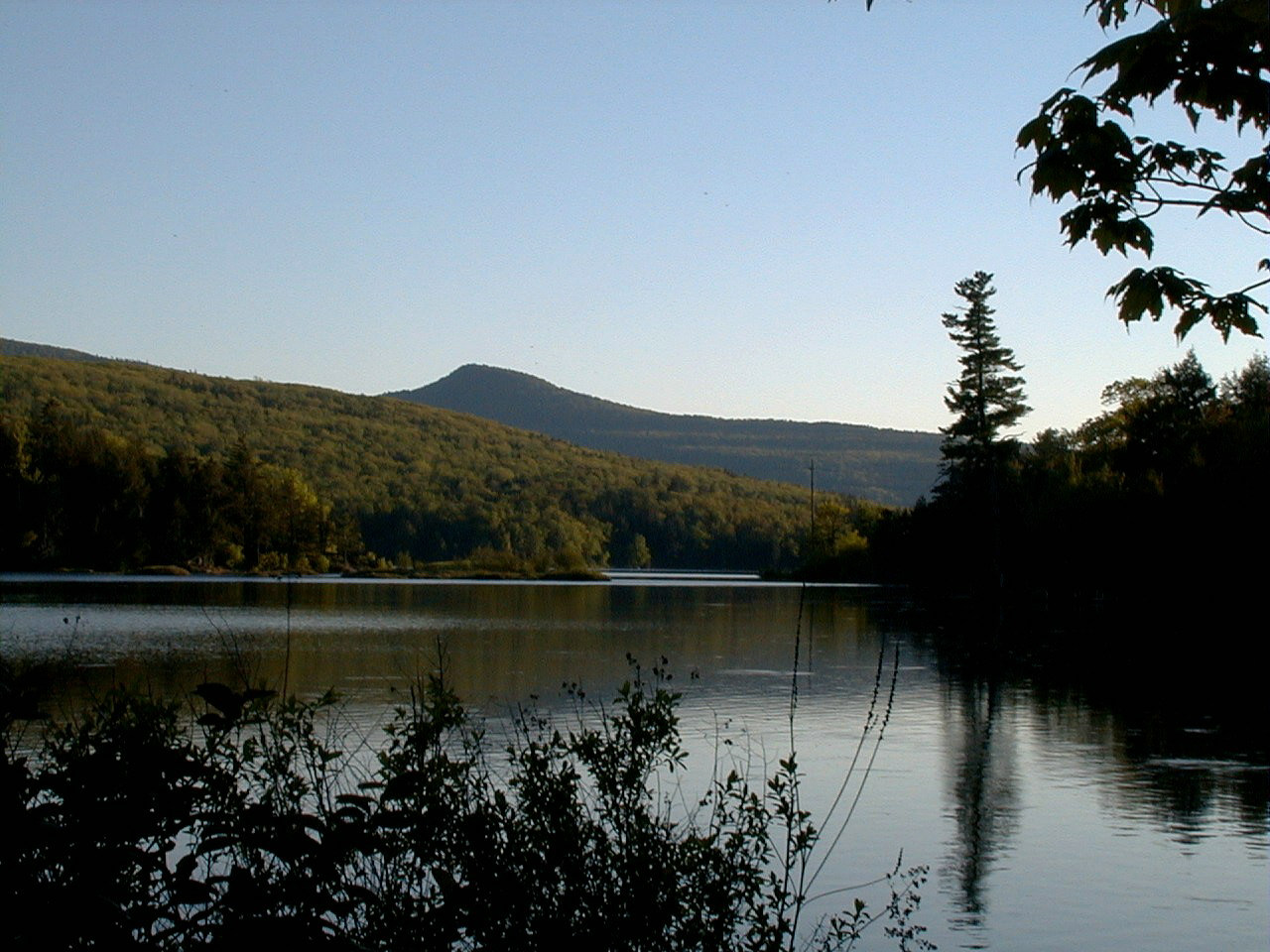
North-South Lake, the "shady vale" explored by naturalist John Bartram

That began to change in 1741 when early American naturalist John Bartram climbed up to a "shady vale" around North-South Lake, where he collected samples of the resin of the "Balm of Gilead" tree (balsam fir) to send to his English patron, Peter Collinson. He returned the next year for more. Collinson regularly prevailed on Bartram over the next several years to return for some seeds of the tree, which the former hoped to grow in England, and in 1753 he did, accompanied by a guide and his son William. Despite being seriously ill, he returned to South Lake. He was unable to harvest any seeds, but in the process became the first person to record a visit to Kaaterskill Falls. His account, "To ye Cats Kill Mountains with Billy", illustrated by the boy, was the first scientific report on the Catskills. It listed most of the flora of the area and speculated on how the mountains might have been formed.

=== Independence and 19th century ===
After the Revolution, the members of the Livingston family whose ancestral estate was the portion of the Hudson's eastern shore now the Hudson River Historic District, a National Historic Landmark (NHL), continued to enjoy the semi-feudal landownership they had broken with the Crown to protect. They made sure their estate houses, like Clermont Manor and Montgomery Place, both also NHLs, provided ample views of the Escarpment across the river, lands which the family had started to acquire. "The view to be had from these houses became of the very first importance," according to Catskill historian Alf Evers. "... [A] man looking toward the Catskills from the east bank could see a view the equal in almost every respect to the already famous ones admired by so many tourists to England's Lake District." Horatio Spafford voiced a similar opinion at the time. "[The mountains] associate a mass of interesting, picturesque and sublime objects, no where exceeded in this country", he wrote in his 1813 gazetteer of the state. Later on, they followed the principles of Andrew Jackson Downing in designing their landscapes to provide views from their roads and paths. Even after the Livingstons moved on to other regions of the country, their reputation made the Catskills known in Britain as well as the U.S.

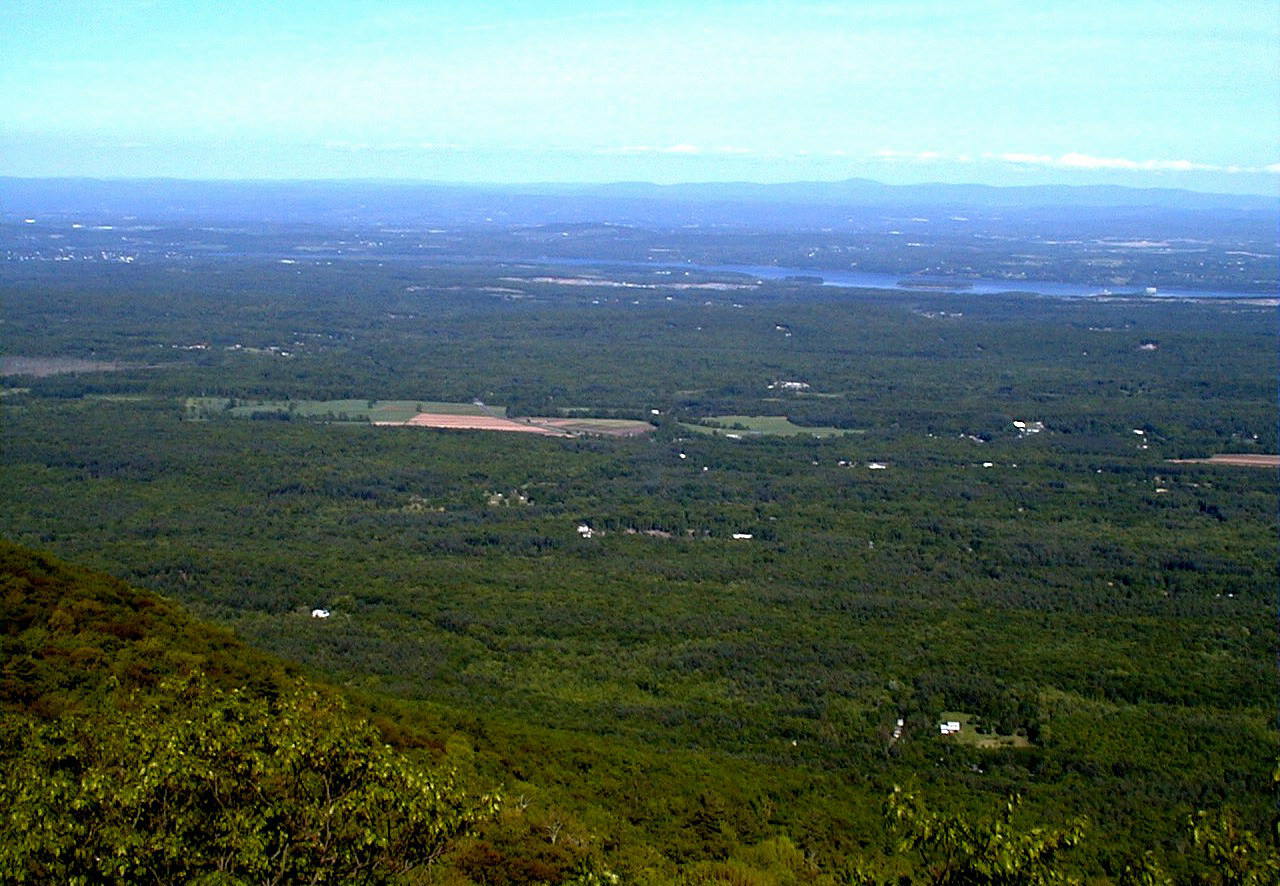
Contemporary image of part of the view from Pine Orchard.

In 1812, Washington Irving visited the Livingston estates for a week; he may have taken some of his inspiration for "Rip Van Winkle", published seven years later, from that view. Other prominent American writers of the time took notice of the Catskills as well. In a famous passage in James Fenimore Cooper's The Pioneers, written in 1823, Natty Bumppo describes both Kaaterskill Falls and the Pine Orchard, the area Bartram had explored and written about decades before.

... the place I mean is next to the river, where one of the ridges juts out a little from the rest, and where the rocks fall for the best part of a thousand feet so much up and down that a man standing on their edges is fool enough to think he can jump from top to bottom.

"What see you when you get there ? " asked Edwards.

"Creation!" said Natty, dropping the end of his rod into the water, and sweeping one hand around him in a circle, "all creation, lad."

The same year the hotel later to become the Catskill Mountain House was built at the spot. DeWitt Clinton was an early visitor. In 1824, the Hunter Turnpike, forerunner of today's Route 23A, was cut through Kaaterskill Clove, making the whole area more accessible. Otherwise, the area remained the same undeveloped wilderness Bartram had explored.

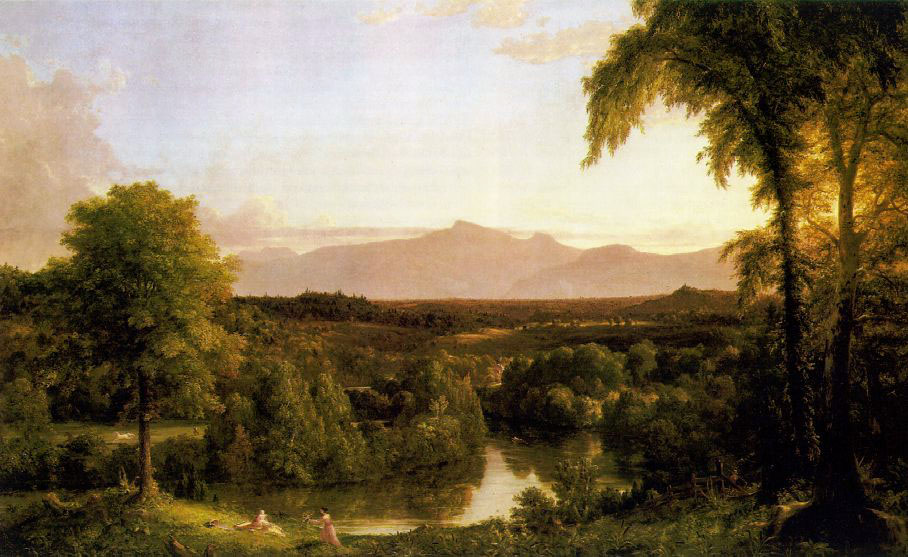
View on the Catskill, Early Autumn, one of Thomas Cole's paintings of the Escarpment

It was an ideal subject for a young painter named Thomas Cole, who visited the Catskills in 1825 and stayed at the new hotel. Struck by its wildness and the many scenic views both from the Escarpment and of it, he took sketches of the area and returned several times to get more. The Catskills had been a subject of art since the 1730s, but the landscape paintings Cole eventually produced caused a sensation back in New York, with John Trumbull observing that Cole "has done what I have all my life attempted in vain". Other artists like Asher Durand and Frederick Church began following Cole up the Hudson, and their similarly styled Romantic renderings of the region, dubbed the Hudson River School, became the young nation's first native art movement.

=== Hotel era ===
Poet William Cullen Bryant similarly used his art to glorify the Catskills, helping to create interest in the region as a tourist destination. Steamboat service up the Hudson, and later the railroads, made it even more accessible from New York City. Charles Beach took over a failing Catskill Mountain House in 1846 and turned it into one of mid-19th century America's most exclusive resorts, visited by presidents and other dignitaries. Guests explored the area, following paths and trails that still exist, to visit Kaaterskill Falls and other scenic spots.

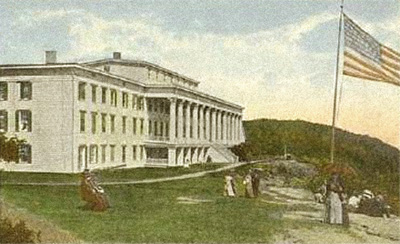
The Catskill Mountain House, c. 1915

Competing hotels opened up nearby over the next several decades. The Kaaterskill Hotel, founded by a disgruntled Mountain House guest, was located near the summit of South Mountain. The more modest Laurel House stood near the top of Kaaterskill Falls. Several hoteliers attempted to make a similar success on the summit of Overlook Mountain.

In the 1880s, the hotels started to lose their luster. The Catskills had already been displaced as New York's highest mountains by the Adirondacks‘ Mount Marcy and other High Peaks there; in 1879 Princeton geology professor Arnold Guyot, a regular summer guest at the Mountain House since the Civil War, announced that not only were the so-called "Shandaken Mountains" in Ulster County to the southwest geologically continuous with the Catskills, one of them, Slide Mountain, was at 4,180 feet (1,270 m) the highest peak in the entire range, instead of the Escarpment's Kaaterskill High Peak. He had also found that the Mountain House itself was not as high as Beach claimed. Beach and the other Escarpment resort owners tried to discredit Guyot and his findings, but within years they had been verified by others.

A few years later, in 1885, the state legislature responded to increasing concerns that rampant logging in the Adirondacks might cause erosion that would silt up the Erie Canal and make it unnavigable by creating the Forest Preserve, under which any state land in several counties was to be left "forever wild". The Catskills were included in a later, revised version of the bill, when the Ulster County delegation saw a chance to take some tax-delinquent properties, and the county's obligations to the state, off the counties' hands. In 1894 the legislature and voters responded to loopholes in the legislation by writing it into the state constitution, where its language has remained as Article 14 ever since.

While this had no immediate effect on the hoteliers, other trends of the era began producing a decline in guests at the Escarpment hotels. Expansions of the railroad network meant that the wealthy guests who had previously been content to go to the Mountain House or Kaaterskill instead went to their own Great Camps in the Adirondacks, or to other mountainous or coastal regions. Competing hotels in areas further inland now recognized as being in the Catskills claimed to offer a more genuine mountain experience, and purer air, to their guests. The guests who did come tended to stay for shorter periods, mainly hot weekends in the summer. Beach and the Mountain House made a long-planned joint venture to build an incline railway up the Escarpment to the hotel a reality in 1892, but it cut into their profits.

=== 20th century ===
The state made its first significant purchases along the Escarpment in 1900, with parcels along the ridgetop north of Blackhead. Beach, who had finally dropped his resistance to Jewish guests and electricity, died in 1902 and left his hotel to his sons. The roads up the cloves were paved to accommodate the then-new automobile. Since guests could then more easily reach the newer resorts further into the mountains, the Mountain House continued to suffer. The incline railroad was shut down in 1918. When the Hotel Kaaterskill burned down in 1924, it was not rebuilt.

The next year the state acquired Stoppel Point, complementing its purchase of Kaaterskill High Peak, most of Overlook, Plattekill and Roundtop in 1921, which had capped two decades of acquisitions on the northern Escarpment. It closed in on the Mountain House with the purchase of South Mountain and the former Kaaterskill site as the decade ended, and the son-in-law who now owned the Mountain House had to sell most of the tract to the state to make ends meet.

Despite the onset of the Great Depression, the Mountain House struggled through a few years, closing for a while, then reopening for one final season in 1942 under new ownership. New owners also began building a third Overlook Hotel in 1927 and continued throughout the 1930s; however, their supplies were stolen during World War II and the project was abandoned. Its decaying frame remains near the mountain's summit.

There were some attempts to revive the Mountain House after the war, and preservationists urged that it be restored as an architectural treasure. But the increasingly decrepit building was becoming hazardous to the hikers who explored it, and after the state acquired the building and the lands around it in 1962, the then-Conservation Department burned it down early the next year. Only its stone gateposts remain. Five years later the Laurel House was demolished as well.

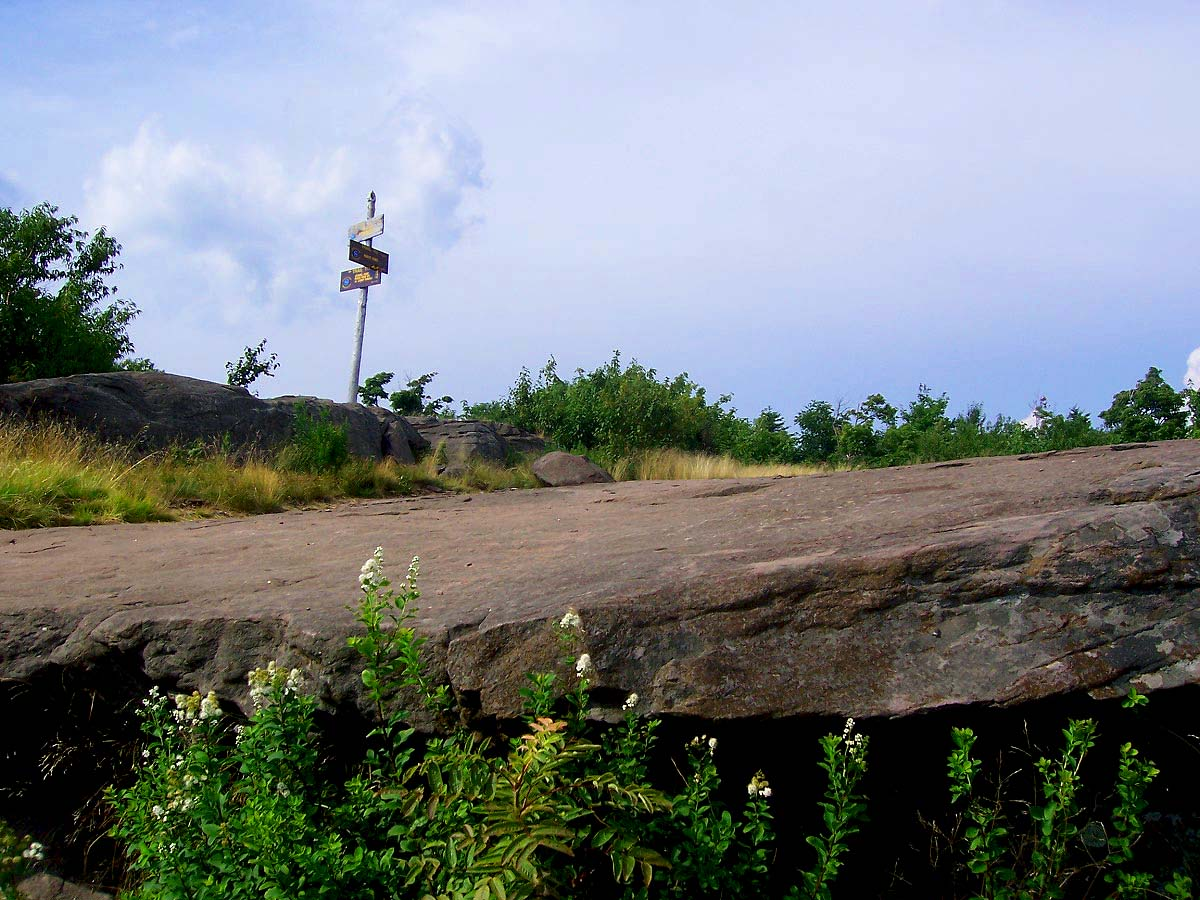
North Point, a typical open ledge of the Escarpment

The Escarpment's transition from private paradise to public playground was complete, although the last mountaintop parcel, the summit of Overlook, was not fully acquired until 1996. Over the course of the rest of the century, the state developed North-South Lake into the busy campground it is today and cut new trails and marked old roads and paths throughout the range. Today the Forest Preserve along the Escarpment is divided into several different management units and administered according to the Catskill State Land Master Plan.

== Natural environment ==
The forests of the Escarpment reflect their history, location and topography. The retreat of the glaciers, particularly on the ridgetops and northern and eastern slopes, scoured the rock, further distressing the growing environment on what are the Catskills' steepest and most exposed slopes. As a result, the coniferous evergreen species characteristic of boreal forests such as red spruce and the balsam fir Bartram sought appear in much higher concentrations, and at lower elevations, then they do elsewhere in the Catskills. The summit of North Mountain, at 3,180 feet (970 m) above sea level, is covered in boreal forest, the lowest Catskill summit of which this is true. While there are no true alpine zones in the Catskills, Kudish has found the only areas in the range which come close along the Escarpment at elevations between 2,260 and 2,720 feet (690 and 830 m) along the Escarpment as it rises from lakes to North Mountain. These are exposed ridgetops where three-toothed cinquefoil, and in one mountain sandwort, is found. Since those species are shade-intolerant, it suggests that the sites have not reforested since the end of glaciation.

At lower elevations, the many fires that have raged over the region have left it with a mixed forest where oak and pine predominate. Several large areas of Norway spruce were planted on the north slopes of Windham High Peak during reforestation efforts following state land acquisitions in the 1930s. Due to the history of fires and logging on the northern sections of the range, there are very few areas of first-growth remaining outside of the boreal plots. The largest is the summit of Blackhead; the largest hardwood first-growth is likewise the 0.9 square miles (230 ha) around the summit of Windham High Peak. The eastern hemlocks around Spruce Creek below Kaaterskill Falls are also a virgin stand. They survived the era when tanners sought the species for the tannin in its bark since the steep and perilous nature of that terrain made them too difficult to profitably extract. It and many of the other ravines draining into Kaaterskill Clove also support some plants species rare in New York State, such as roseroot stonecrop and fragrant cliff fern (listed as threatened and endangered at the state level, respectively).

Dominant fauna of the Escarpment are the species found elsewhere in the Catskills: white-tailed deer, porcupine, fisher, black bear and snowshoe hare. There have been some rare bobcat sightings up on the ridge. Bird species like the rare Bicknell's thrush and ruffed grouse nest in the boreal forests. A few timber rattlesnake dens are known to exist on the rocky ledges of Overlook at the southern end of the range. The paucity of water on the ridgetops and the slopes means that there are few major fish or amphibian species in the Escarpment, save around North-South Lake.

== Protected areas ==
Most of the Escarpment, including all its mountaintops and ridges, has been acquired by the state and added to the Forest Preserve, requiring that it be kept forever wild. Private land is found only in the cloves, where some of it is also protected. The Forest Preserve lands are divided into management units by the state Department of Environmental Conservation (DEC). Initially all of the state lands save North-South Lake Public Campground were classified as Wild Forests, a protection level unique to New York that is slightly less restrictive than wilderness. In 2008 an updated Catskill State Land Master Plan combined the North Mountain, Windham High Peak and Blackhead Range Wild Forests into one new unit, the Windham-Blackhead Range Wilderness. Two old roads through the Escarpment were also given a new classification, Primitive Bicycle Corridor, to accommodate mountain bikes.

From north to south, the areas are:

- Overlook Turnpike Primitive Bicycle Corridor: The road up Overlook Mountain and past Plattekill Mountain to the end of Prediger Road in the Town of Hunter.
- Overlook Mountain Wild Forest: 590 acres (240 ha) around the road up Overlook and the mountain's summit.
- Indian Head Wilderness Area. Eastern section of the wilderness area that includes the entire Devil's Path located on the Escarpment. Includes Echo Lake, the only significant body of water in a Catskill wilderness area.
- Platte Clove Preserve. A 288-acre (117 ha) tract owned by the Catskill Center for Conservation and Development at the head of the clove. The only privately owned protected area in the Escarpment.
- Kaaterskill Wild Forest This 8,550-acre (3,460 ha) management unit includes all the state land on Kaaterskill High Peak, and, in the updated plan, the Kaaterskill Clove and South Mountain areas including Kaaterskill Falls.
- North Lake-South Lake State Campground. The 1,100-acre (450 ha) former site of the Mountain House and other hotels is the most-visited section of the Escarpment, with over two hundred campsites.
- Windham-Blackhead Range Wilderness. Created in the updated master plan from the merger of three smaller Wild Forests. Its 17,100 acres (6,900 ha) surround the Big Hollow Valley and include the Escarpment from North Point to past Windham high Peak.
- Colgate Lake/Dutcher Notch Primitive Bicycle Corridor: The 2.4-mile (3.9 km) old road from the lake through the notch and down the east side of the Escarpment.
- Elm Ridge Wild Forest: Formerly part of the Windham High Peak Wild Forest, this 1,355-acre (548 ha) unit occupies the north end of the Escarpment within the Catskill Park.

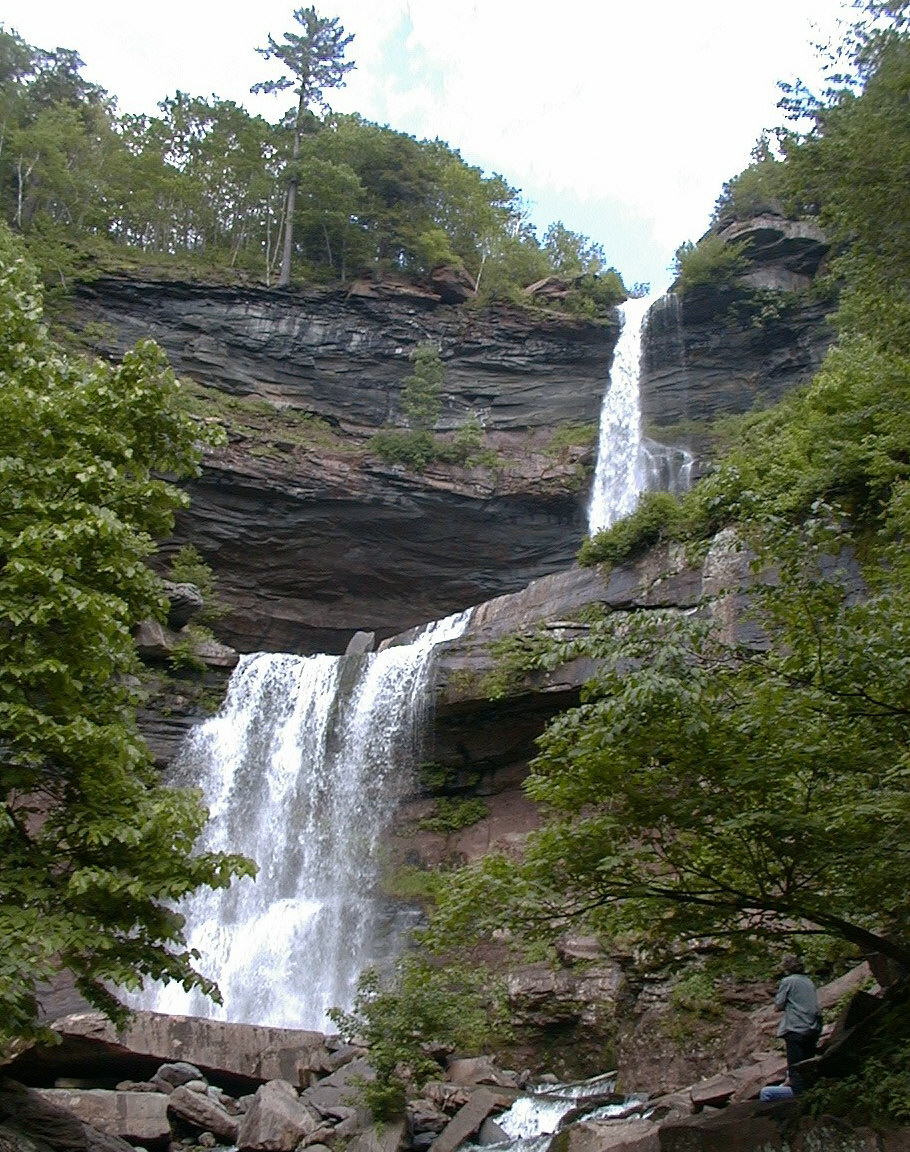
Kaaterskill Falls, still a popular destination for visitors.

== Recreational use ==
All the Escarpment's public lands are available for passive recreation such as hiking, camping and birding. Hunting and fishing are permitted within season and as otherwise regulated by the state. Unpowered boating is permitted on Echo and North–South lakes.

Use is free except for North-South Lake Public Campground, for which an $8 fee is charged per vehicle in season (Campers are also charged $22 for the site). In return, heavier-impact camping and activities are allowed, and greater services are provided to visitors. There is also a 12-mile (18 km) snowmobile loop trail around Kaaterskill High Peak and Round Top.

The Escarpment has many hiking trails. Foremost among them is the 22.3-mile (35.9 km) Escarpment Trail, which begins at Schutt Road just outside the campground gate. From there it goes north to Route 23, climbing over Stoppel Point, Blackhead and Windham High Peak along the way. All but the southernmost 2.5 miles (4.0 km) are also part of the Long Path long-distance trail, which itself traverses Kaaterskill High Peak and descends Kaaterskill Clove to near Palenville and then reascends to join the Escarpment Trail. Backpackers starting near Woodstock can use the trail up that mountain to hike the entire Escarpment, connecting to the Long Path between Indian Head and Plattekill mountains.

Other trails climb the ridge, all from the west with the exception of the Dutcher Notch Trail. They mainly provide access to the Escarpment Trail, except for the old trails around the Mountain House property at North-South Lake which provide short connections and loop trips between the campground and various sections of the Escarpment Trail. The most popular trail in the entire Catskills is the short trail up to Kaaterskill Falls from Route 23A, formerly the southernmost section of the Escarpment Trail until it was closed above the falls for safety reasons.

== See also ==
- List of escarpments
- List of mountains of New York (state)
- List of subranges of the Appalachian Mountains
