= North Mountain (Catskills) =

Mountain in New York, United States

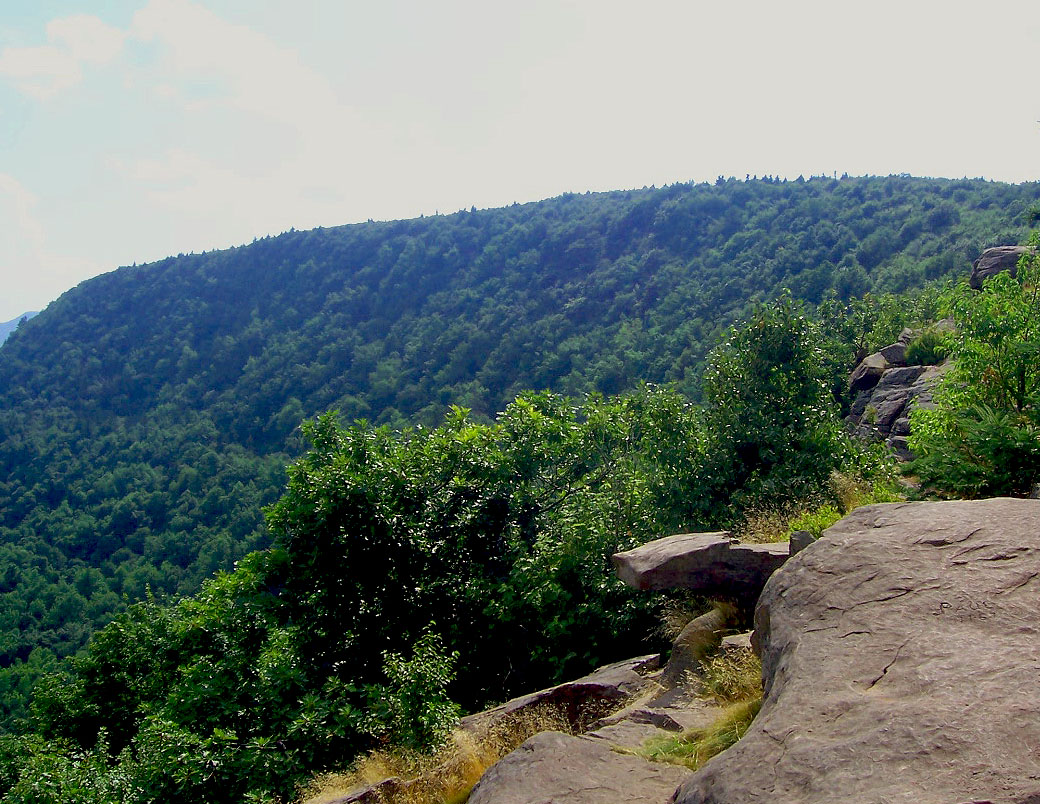
- North Mountain from North Point

Highest point
- Elevation: 3,186 ft (971 m)
- Prominence: 60 ft (18 m)
- Coordinates: 42°13′03″N 74°02′55″W

Geography
- Location: NE of Haines Falls, New York, U.S.
- Parent range: Catskill Escarpment
- Topo map: USGS Kaaterskill Clove

Climbing
- First ascent: Unknown
- Easiest route: Trail

North Mountain is a peak in the Catskill Mountains of New York, on the border between the towns of Catskill and Hunter, in Greene County. It is part of the Catskill Escarpment. Cairo Round Top is located northeast and Artists Rock is located southeast of North Mountain.

It overlooks the North-South Lake State Campground, an area where resort hotels such as the Catskill Mountain House were once located, and thus has long been a popular climb with hikers. It can be reached by several trails from the campground area, all of which eventually lead to the Escarpment Trail, which crosses the summit. The Long Path, a 350-mile (560 km) long-distance hiking trail from New York City to Albany, is contiguous with the Escarpment Trail.

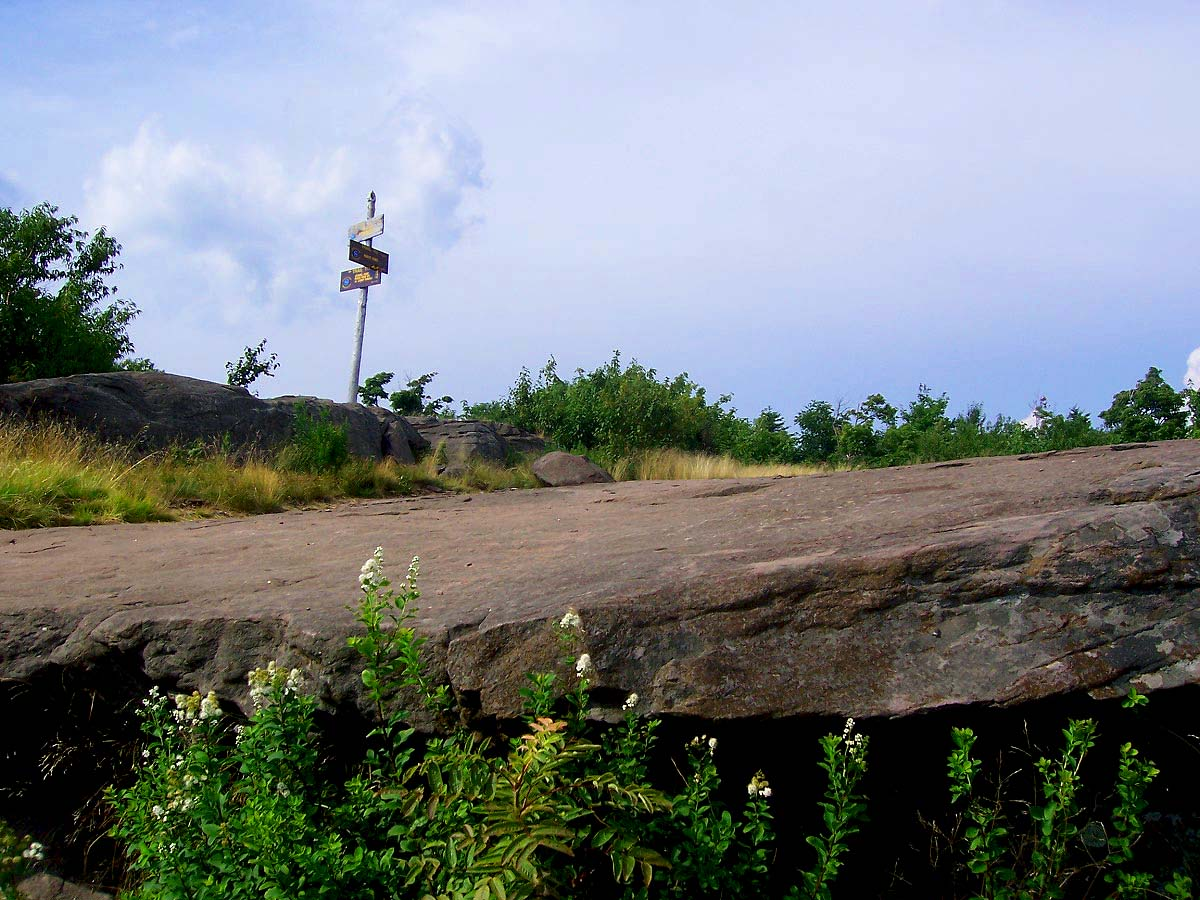
North Point

North Point is an area with many open ledges located at 2,900 feet (880 m), along the trail about a half-mile (800 m) below the summit. From North Point, the views of the lakes, other mountains such as Kaaterskill High Peak and the Hudson River and its valley are expansive. They were sometimes the subject of paintings by members of the Hudson River School.

The summit is also one of the lowest in elevation in the Catskills to feature a boreal forest of red spruce and balsam fir.
