= Seymour Burr =

Enslaved American and Patriot in the American Revolution

Seymour Burr (1754/1762–1837) was an enslaved African-American in the Connecticut Colony in the North American British Colonies and United States. Enslaved by the brother of Colonel Aaron Burr, who was also named Seymour, he was known only as Seymour (sometimes spelled Seymore) until he escaped and used the surname Burr to enlist in the British Army in the early days of the American Revolution. The British promised the personal freedom of any enslaved African-American who enlisted or escaped to fight against the Continental Army, and Burr longed for freedom. However, he was quickly captured and forcibly returned to his enslaver.

His owner, fearing that Seymour would escape again, offered him his freedom at the war's end if he paid over his Bounty Money after enlisting in the American Army; Seymour accepted this agreement.

== Birth ==
There is conflicting information regarding his birth. Some citations list him as born in Connecticut, possibly of mixed-race parentage; others claim he was born in Guinea, Africa, captured at age seven, and was possibly of royal birth. A descriptive Feb 1782 document of enlisted men documents lists his birthplace as "Guinea" with his age given as both 20 and 28, which places his birth in either 1754 or 1762.

== Military service ==
It is alleged that he fought at Bunker Hill and Fort Catskill and suffered through the long winter at Valley Forge. However, Massachusetts Archives show only that on April 5, 1781, Seymour enlisted in the 7th Massachusetts Regiment, led by Colonel John Brooks and served until Feb 1782.

== Freedom and Marriage ==
After his service, he was given his freedom. Then in 1805, he married a widow, Mary (Will) Wilbore, daughter of Nuff Will and Sarah Moho (Mohho), a Native American woman of the Ponkapoag tribe, and settled in what is now Canton, Massachusetts. In marrying her, he inherited the 6 acres (24,000 m^{2}) of land owned by her previous husband, Jacob Wilbor. He also collected a government pension for his military service. The couple had two daughters: Polly (Burr) Croud and Sally (Sarah). Both of his daughters died in Cambridge, Mass. An 1892 History of Canton reported that a grandson of Seymour Burr named Lemuel Burr was a resident of Boston, Mass. The report is confirmed by two sources:
1842 Boston City Directory:

- Burr, Lemuel, barber, 65 Court, house 3 Southac and a
- Burr, Sarah, widow, house 16 Belknap

In 1861 report to the Massachusetts Governor reports:

- Sally Burr age 61 "Punkapogg" State beneficiary
- Lemuel Burr age 45 "Punkapogg" Occupation Barber

along with wife and 4 children:

- Mary Burr age 39 "Colored"
- Ann E. Burr age 14 "Punkapogg"
- Lemuel D. Burr age 12 "Punkapogg"
- Mary M Burr age 6 "Punkapogg"
- Sally L. Burr age 4 "Punkapogg"

An 1872 Cambridge Directory lists a Lemuel Burr as "Hairdresser."

== Death ==
Seymour Burr died on February 17, 1837, and was buried in an unmarked grave in the Canton Corner, Canton, Mass., or at the graveyard at Burr Lane, Canton, Mass. His obituary was printed in the Liberator (Boston, MA), February 25, 1837, p. 35: DIED—In Canton, 17th inst. Mr. Semore Burr, (a colored man) aged 98. He was a soldier during the whole of the Revolutionary war.

His widow died in 1852 at the age of either 98 or 101.

== See also ==
- List of slaves

== Publications ==
- Huntoon, Daniel T. V. (1893). History of the Town of Canton, Norfolk County, Massachusetts. University Press. pp. 28–31, 623 (list of Rev War soldiers).
- Endicott, Frederic, ed. (1896). The Record of the Births; Marriages and Deaths and Intentions of Marriage in the town of Stoughton from 1727 to 1800 and in the Town of Canton from 1797 to 1845 Proceeded by the Records of the South Precinct of Dorchester from 1715 to 1727. William Bense. p. 208 (Burr death record).
- Nell, William Cooper; Stowe, Harriet Beecher (1855). The Colored Patriots of the American Revolution. Boston: Robert F. Wallcut. "fort catskill american revolution."
