= History of the Catskill Mountains =

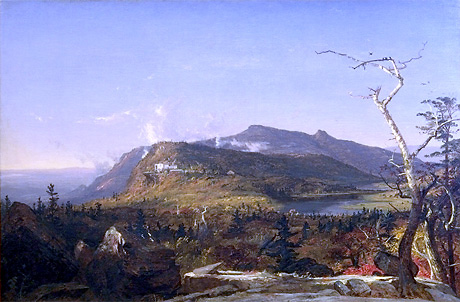
The Mountain cabin , 1836, by Jasper Francis Cropsey

The Catskill Mountains, also known as the Catskills, is a physiographic province and subrange of the larger Appalachian Mountains, located in southeastern New York.

== Natural history ==
=== Early geologic history ===
The region began existence as a river delta 350 million years ago. Streams flowing off the then-mighty Acadian Mountains deposited sediment where the river met a sea (now the Allegheny Plateau). Eventually, the Taconics eroded to their present size and the waters dried up, leaving a mostly flat plain.

During this time period, a meteor is believed to have struck the area. Panther Mountain is the remains of its crater.

Two hundred million years ago, as plate tectonics uplifted the Appalachians, the delta region rose almost uniformly into a plateau rather than breaking up into smaller mountains. Streams that formed over time eroded gaps and valleys, leaving today's "mountains."

=== The Ice Ages ===
The next great change in the Catskill landscape was caused by the most recent of four periods of glaciation, the Wisconsin. Every mountain except Slide (and perhaps West Kill) was covered. The glaciers left behind lakes when they melted, some of which became reservoirs in the 20th century.

Some geologists also believe the glaciers scoured off sedimentary layers that may have contained coal, noting the surfeit of coal to the south in Pennsylvania and that the white quartz pebbles found atop Slide Mountain are often an indicator that one has reached the bottom of a coal bed in those regions.

== Human history ==
=== Prehistory ===
While the matter has yet to be fully researched, there seems to have been no large-scale long-term Native American presence in the mountains. The local Mohican and Munsee tribes used land and water routes through the mountains to get to the places beyond them, hunted the abundant game and used the mountains in some of their rituals, but in general chose not to live there due to the difficulty of farming the land.

=== Dutch settlement ===
Robert Juet, one of Henry Hudson's crew, was the first European to take note of the Catskills on the Half Moon's 1609 expedition up the river. Some hardy pioneers, explorers, and traders followed over the next several decades, leaving their imprint on the region in placenames, but generally not settling the region to a significantly greater extent than the Indigenous did.

In 1667, as a result of the Treaty of Breda which ended the Second Anglo-Dutch War, England's wartime victory was ratified and the British crown took over colonial administration of what was now New York.

Over the next several decades, regular rumors of gold strikes drew more settlers to the region, though none has ever been found. Trade in beaver pelts spurred more exploration and settlement of the region.

=== The Hardenbergh Patent ===
The most important event in the history of the colonial Catskills took place in the first decade of the 18th century during Queen Anne's War. In 1706 an ambitious speculator, major Johannes Hardenbergh, and his partner, Jacob Rutsen, petitioned the governor, Edward, Viscount Cornbury, for a land grant in the mountains of Ulster County, attempting to head off another petition by a group of Hurley farmers who wanted pasture in the area yet had not properly purchased the land from the local Indian tribes as the law required.

The lack of a good survey of the area complicated matters somewhat. After years of arguing, haggling and taking advantage of Cornbury's loose ethics, the Patent was granted on April 20, 1708.

Since they had applied as a corporation, Hardenbergh and Rutsen were exempt from laws limiting any such grant to 2,000 acres (8.1 km^{2}). Yet they wound up, through what some say was a mistake, with title to a thousand times that land, or practically the entire Catskill region as we know it today, in the form of a rough triangle that started west of Kingston and extended, at least on paper, to the west branch of the Delaware.

Settlement was impeded for the next thirty years due to the lack of a survey. Hardenbergh, however, managed to enrich himself by selling shares in the partnership, much to the consternation of colonial governors who wanted a firmer bulwark against French ambitions in North America. There had been no good survey, and no one knew where the boundaries of the patent lay, much less any subdivisions. Indian tribes upset that rivals had sold their land out from under them and squatters who had moved into the area before sabotaged the Wooster brothers' attempts at a first real survey of the region in the 1740s.

In his later years, Hardenbergh was helped greatly by Robert Livingston, who saw the region's economic potential and would acquire 1,000,000 acres (4,000 km^{2}; 1,600 sq mi) of the Hardenbergh Patent. By the time of Hardenbergh's death in 1745 settlement was at last beginning to get underway. Five years later, when the entire Patent was subdivided and accounted for, the Hardenbergh land company was dissolved.

The unclear early history of land ownership in the days of the Patent would impact the region for generations to come.

=== The Bartram expedition ===
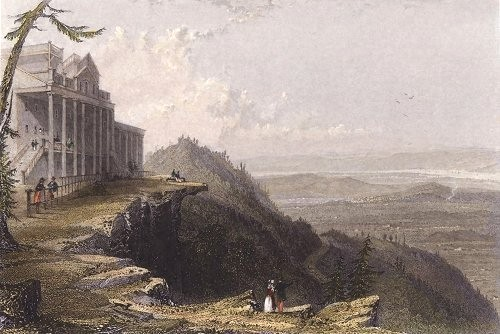
View from The Mountain House, 1836, Thomas Cole

In 1753 the early American naturalists John Bartram and his son William went to the Catskills as part of their explorations into the colonies' plant life, focusing particularly on the balsam fir, which was known among the colonists as balm of Gilead fir and believed by both them and the Indians to have curative powers. While their explorations were not extensive, the elder Bartram's short written account of the adventure, “A Journey to Ye Cat Skill Mountains with Billy,” was widely read and appreciated both in America and abroad. It is the first literary appreciation of the Catskills as a natural environment.

The Bartrams were the first to document the wide variety of tree species in the mountains. Officially, the trip was a failure as the balsam seeds they managed to collect failed to flourish in England. But in the course of collecting them, they explored the area of the Pine Orchard near North and South Lakes on the Escarpment in Greene County, which would in the next century become the site of the Catskill Mountain House.

=== The mid-18th century ===
Robert Livingston's son gradually took over managing his interest in the lands he had acquired and saw their future more in terms of the timber on them than the land itself. Drawing on the family's Scottish roots, he sought to rename them the Lothian Hills and envisioned a grand scheme in which castles named after originals in Scotland would be built on the mountaintops and sold to members of the European nobility who wished to have grand manors.

These plans were put on hold in 1769 when John Bradstreet, a British lieutenant colonel who had fought with distinction in the recent French and Indian War, filed papers with the crown charging that the Hardenbergh Patent had been improperly granted and could thus be regranted; he claimed a 50,000 acre (200 km^{2}) slice as was his right as a retired officer. Other officers joined in with additional, smaller claims.

The colonial governor, John Murray Dunmore, found in 1771 a solution that temporarily settled the issue but pleased no one: he awarded Bradstreet 20,000 acres (80 km^{2}) in what is now Delaware County but said nothing about the legality of the original patent. Back in London, the Privy Council urged King George III to block it, and he duly ordered the new governor, William Tryon, not to sign any grant for the land.

Bradstreet died in 1774, and his daughters were widely expected to take the fight to court, but very soon that took a backseat to other events.

=== The Revolutionary War ===
As tensions increased between the colonies and Britain during the early 1770s over how to pay for the war, the Catskills saw this divide play out rather sharply. The large landowners like Livingston and the Hardenberghs, fearing Parliament would settle the matter with a land tax that would vastly cut into their wealth, increasingly took stands that would lead to independence. Their tenant farmers, on the other hand, were, as Livingston put it, "resolved to stand by their King," despite their landlords' efforts to drum up revolutionary sentiment among them, in the belief that if it came down to war, the Crown would confiscate the holdings of those who had opposed it and distribute smaller parcels back to those who had been loyal.

This came to a head in 1777, when Lieutenant Jacob Rose raised an army of several hundred of the region's young men to go fight alongside the British in return for 50 acres (0.2 km^{2}) each. Rose's Rangers, as they were called, had to make its way through the strongly Patriot Hudson Valley to rendezvous with British regulars in New York City, however, and was captured in the vicinity of Schunemunk Mountain in Orange County after a skirmish with local militia. Prisoners were taken to Fort Montgomery and tried for treason against the recently established state of New York. Most were pardoned in exchange for committing to serve in the Continental Army; Rose and a few other holdouts were hanged.

The failure of Rose's mission and the burning of Kingston by British forces that year severely blunted Tory sentiment in the Catskills, and for the remainder of the war the region posed no threat to the Patriot cause.

=== Jewish resort destination ===
The Catskills became a major resort destination for Jewish New Yorkers in the mid-20th century. Borscht Belt is an informal term for the summer resorts of the Catskill Mountains in Sullivan and Ulster counties in upstate New York which were frequented by Ashkenazic Jews. At its peak of popularity, about 500 resorts operated in the region. Later changes in vacationing patterns have led most of those travelers elsewhere, although there are still bungalow communities and summer camps in the towns of Liberty, Bethel, Monticello and Fallsburg catering to Orthodox populations. The term, which derives from the name of a beet soup popular with people of Eastern European origin, can also refer to the Catskill region itself.

=== Woodstock rock festival ===
In August 1969, the Catskills were the site of a music and art festival in the town of Bethel, which had originally been planned for Woodstock, New York. Thirty-three of the best-known musicians of the era appeared during a sometimes rainy weekend in front of nearly half a million concertgoers. The event, featuring liberal drug use and nudity, exemplified the counterculture of the 1960s and 1970s.
