= Artists Rock =

Mountain in New York, United States

Artists Rocks
- Location within New York Adirondack Park Location within the United States

Highest point
- Elevation: 2,264 feet (690 m)
- Coordinates: 42°12′05″N 74°01′50″W range_coordinates =

Geography
- Location: SW of Lawrenceville, New York, U.S.
- Topo map: USGS Kaaterskill Clove

Artists Rocks is a cliff in Greene County, New York. It is located in the Catskill Mountains southwest of Lawrenceville. North Mountain is located northwest of Artists Rocks.
