= Windham High Peak =

Mountain in New York, United States

- Location within New York Location within the United States

Highest point
- Elevation: 3,524 ft (1,074 m)
- Prominence: 744 ft (227 m)
- Listing: Catskill High Peaks 34th
- Coordinates: 42°18.89′N 74°8.59′W

Geography
- Location: Greene County, New York
- Parent range: Catskill Mountains
- Topo map: USGS Hensonville

Windham High Peak is a mountain located in Greene County, New York. The mountain is part of the Catskill Mountains.

Windham High Peak stands within the watershed of the Hudson River, which drains into New York Bay. The south and northwest sides of Windham drain into Batavia Kill, and thence into Schoharie Creek, the Mohawk River, and the Hudson River. The northeast side of Windham drains into Bowery Creek, thence into Catskill Creek, and the Hudson River more directly. And the southeast side drains via Plattekill Creek into Esopus Creek, a still lower Hudson tributary. The summit trijunction of the divides between these watersheds demarcated, until at least 1629, the traditional boundary tripoint of Mohawk, Mohican, and Delaware territory, respectively.

Windham High Peak is within New York's Catskill Park. The Long Path, a 350-mile (560 km) long-distance hiking trail from New York City to Albany, is contiguous with the Escarpment Trail.

== See also ==
- List of mountains in New York
- Catskill High Peaks
- Catskill Mountain 3500 Club
