= North–South Lake =

Lake in New York, United States

North-South Lake
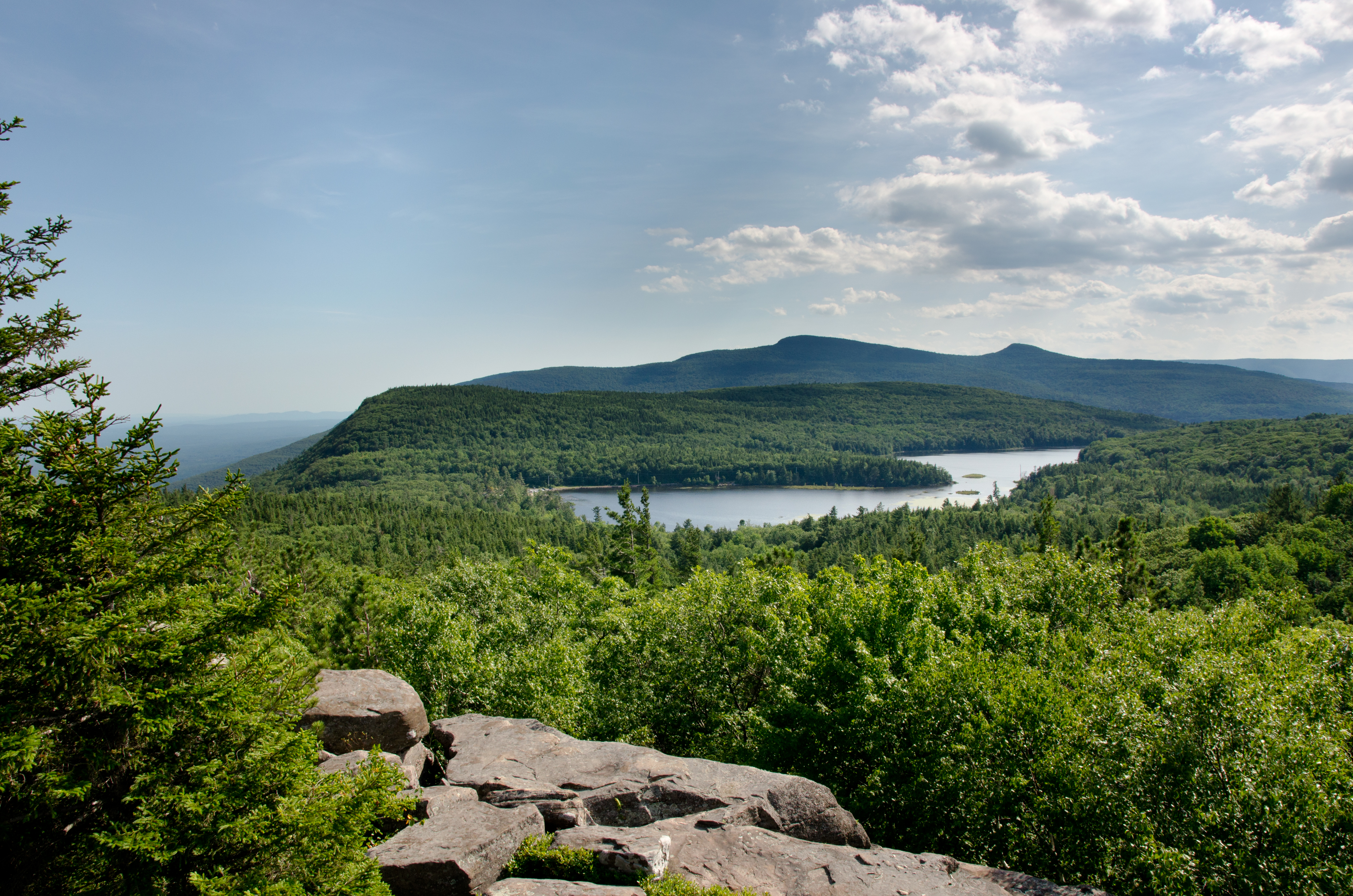
- View from Sunset Rocks

- Location within New York Location within the United States
- Location: Greene County, New York
- Coordinates: 42°11′56.87″N 74°2′27.86″W
- Basin countries: United States
- Surface area: 83 acres (34 ha)
- Average depth: 5.6 ft (1.7 m)

North–South Lake is an 1,100-acre (4.4 km^{2}) state campground in the Catskill Forest Preserve near Palenville, New York operated by the New York State Department of Environmental Conservation near the site of the historic Catskill Mountain House overlooking the Hudson River. The escarpment on which the lakes are located is at 2,250 feet (685.8 m), 1,700 feet (518 m) above the valley floor, providing a view of five states in clear weather.

The area is rich in history. It was a favorite subject of painters in the Hudson River School, particularly Thomas Cole. For a long time, the prestigious resort hotels in the area made it synonymous with the Catskills.

Today, the area provides hiking, swimming, boating (no motors), and fishing.

== History ==
=== Early America ===
The North–South Lake area is not only the beginning of the recreational history of the Catskills, but "America's First Wilderness."

This goes back to the years before the Revolution, to 1753, when early naturalist John Bartram visited the area with his son to collect samples of balsam fir, which was sought for its alleged medicinal properties. While the seedlings he gathered failed to flourish in Britain when replanted by his patrons, his account of the expedition, "A Journey to Ye Cat Skill Mountains with Billy," became popular in the colonies and in Britain.

=== Hudson River School ===
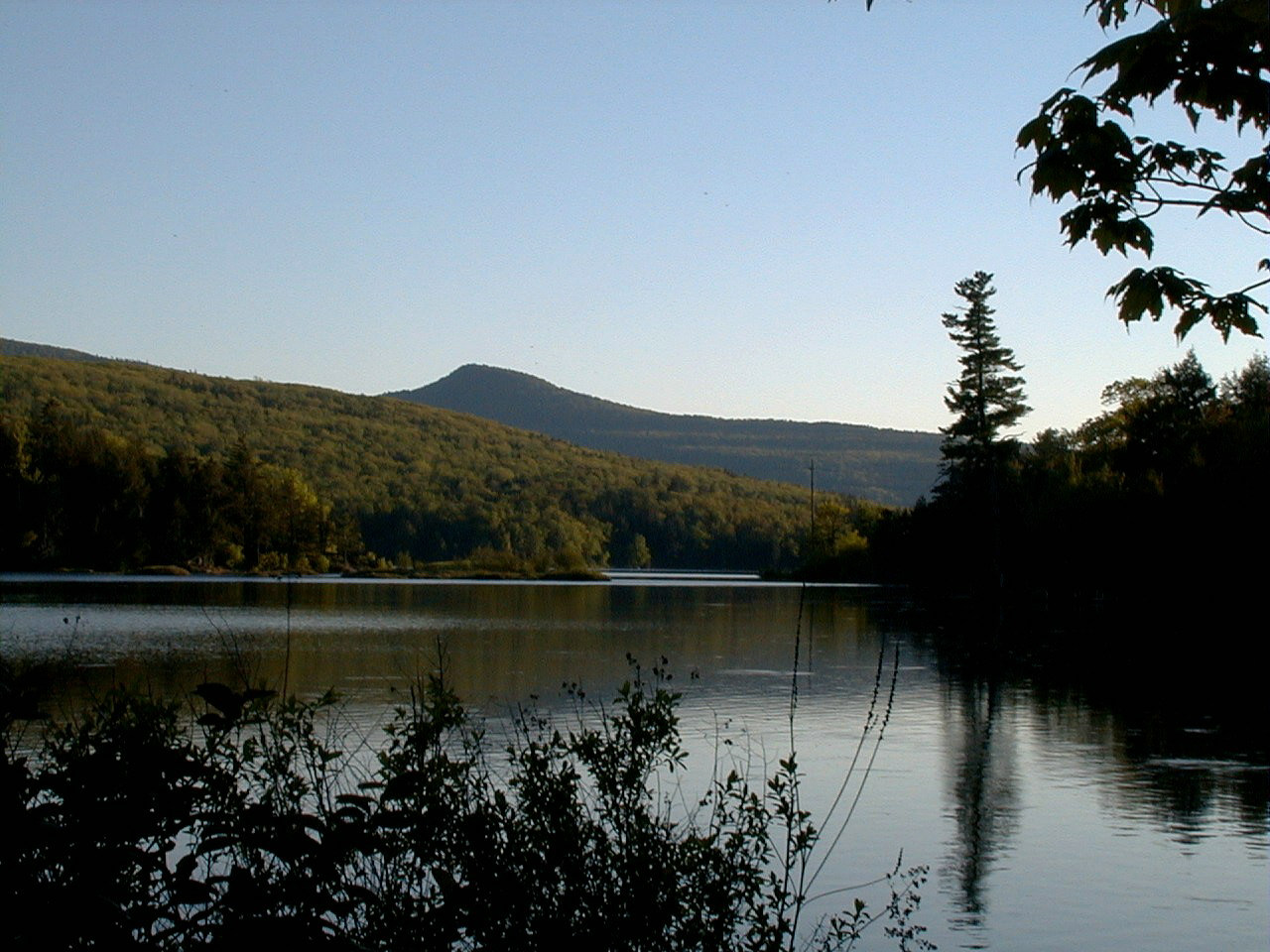
North-South Lake

In the early years of the 19th century, American artists seeking a subject matter unique to the new nation were drawn away from New York City and up the Hudson Valley. There they focused on the wildness of the landscape where mountains drew close to the river, first in the Hudson Highlands and then, further north, the Catskill Escarpment, where mountains rise to nearly 4,000 feet (1219 m) from a flat valley floor. Their work was known, at first derisively, as the Hudson River School and eventually became America's first homegrown artistic movement.

On that escarpment they found the two lakes. Painters like Thomas Cole depicted them in many works that sold far and wide.

=== Resort hotels ===
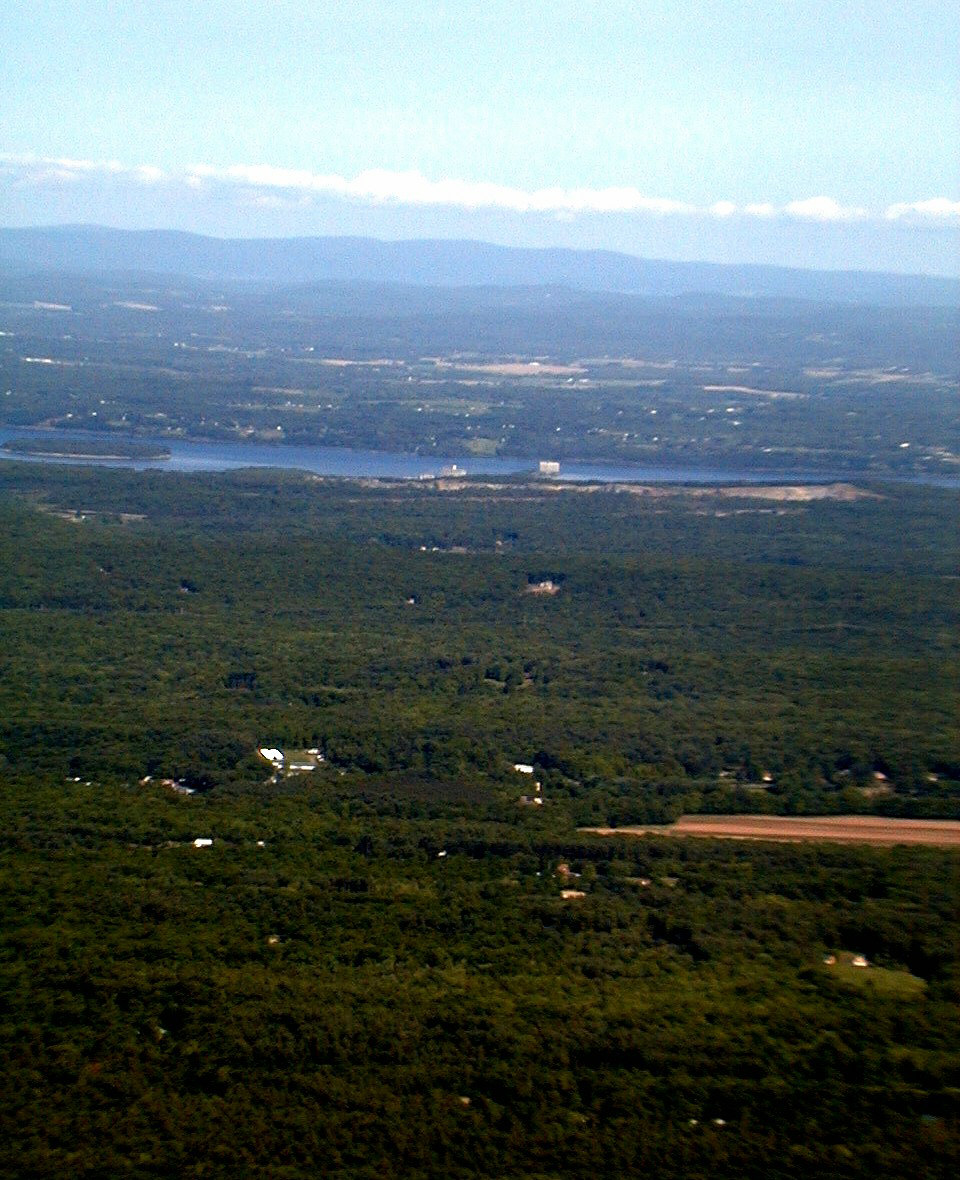
View east over the Hudson River from Catskill Mountain House site. Taconic Mountains of New York, Connecticut and Massachusetts are in the background.

Cole would be a frequent guest at, and lend his fame to, the Catskill Mountain House, built in 1823 by a group of businessmen from the nearby village of Catskill on the "Pine Orchard" overlook that the Bartrams had made famous in their visit 70 years earlier. In 1839, Charles Beach took over. He made it into a premiere attraction for the country's elite, a sort of Hamptons of its day where politicians (including some presidents), captains of industry, artists, poets and writers would rub shoulders, admire the view, take walks in the adjacent forests by day and excellent dinners by night.

The hotel owners told guests that an Indian legend had it that the two lakes were the eyes of a fallen giant, and his buried body the escarpment itself (in reality, there is no such legend).

Other hotels were built in the area. Beach's remark to a dissatisfied guest, a Philadelphia businessman, that he should build himself his own hotel led to the creation of the Hotel Kaaterskill near the top of neighboring South Mountain, and the smaller Laurel House Hotel on Laurel House Road in Haines Falls, N.Y. boasted control over one of the top attractions of the area, Kaaterskill Falls.

The popularity of the resorts led to the construction of narrow-gauge rail spurs and an incline railway up the escarpment to more efficiently bring guests to their destinations. The rights-of-way remain in the area to this day although the tracks themselves are long gone.

The area's reputation suffered a major blow in the early 1880s when Arnold Henry Guyot, an occasional visitor, undertook to do in his spare time the first complete survey of the Catskills and found that, contrary to the claims of Beach and other hoteliers in the area, the highest mountain was not nearby Kaaterskill High Peak, which dominates the view south over the lakes, but Slide Mountain, some distance to the southwest in the Ulster County town of Shandaken. They at first disputed this claim vigorously and even tried to cast aspersions on Guyot's reputation, but by 1886 his results had been confirmed by others and the North-South lake region had lost some of its cachet.

In the early 20th century the hotels began to decline as other mountain regions in the Northeast and elsewhere began to attract guests and automobiles began to displace rail as the primary means of intercity transport, making vacations of a weekend's duration possible rather than the weeks and months guests had often stayed at the Mountain House.

Fires leveled both the Kaaterskill and Laurel; neither was ever rebuilt.

=== Public ownership ===
In 1929 the state parks department, under the leadership of Robert Moses, took advantage of the downturn in the hotel business to acquire some of the land around the lakes and keep them "forever wild" under Article 14 of the New York State Constitution. At that time the two lakes were separated by an earthen dam, and South Lake and the land east of North Lake beach were privately owned. The original campground consisted of 10 sites (there are currently 219 sites) and a small picnic area. The beaches were added in 1936.

Eventually, the state was able to acquire all the land save that around the original Mountain House, which finally closed for good after a failed attempt to revive and relaunch it in 1940. After the war that, too, would come into state ownership.

While preservationists fought to save the remains of the Mountain House throughout the 1950s for their historical value, the policies under which Forest Preserve land was managed required the state to remove most structures on it, and they were becoming an attractive nuisance as well. Accordingly, the Mountain House was razed one winter morning in 1963.

In the 1970s, the dam between the lakes was removed and a new dam built at the outlet of South Lake to create one large lake.

== Today ==
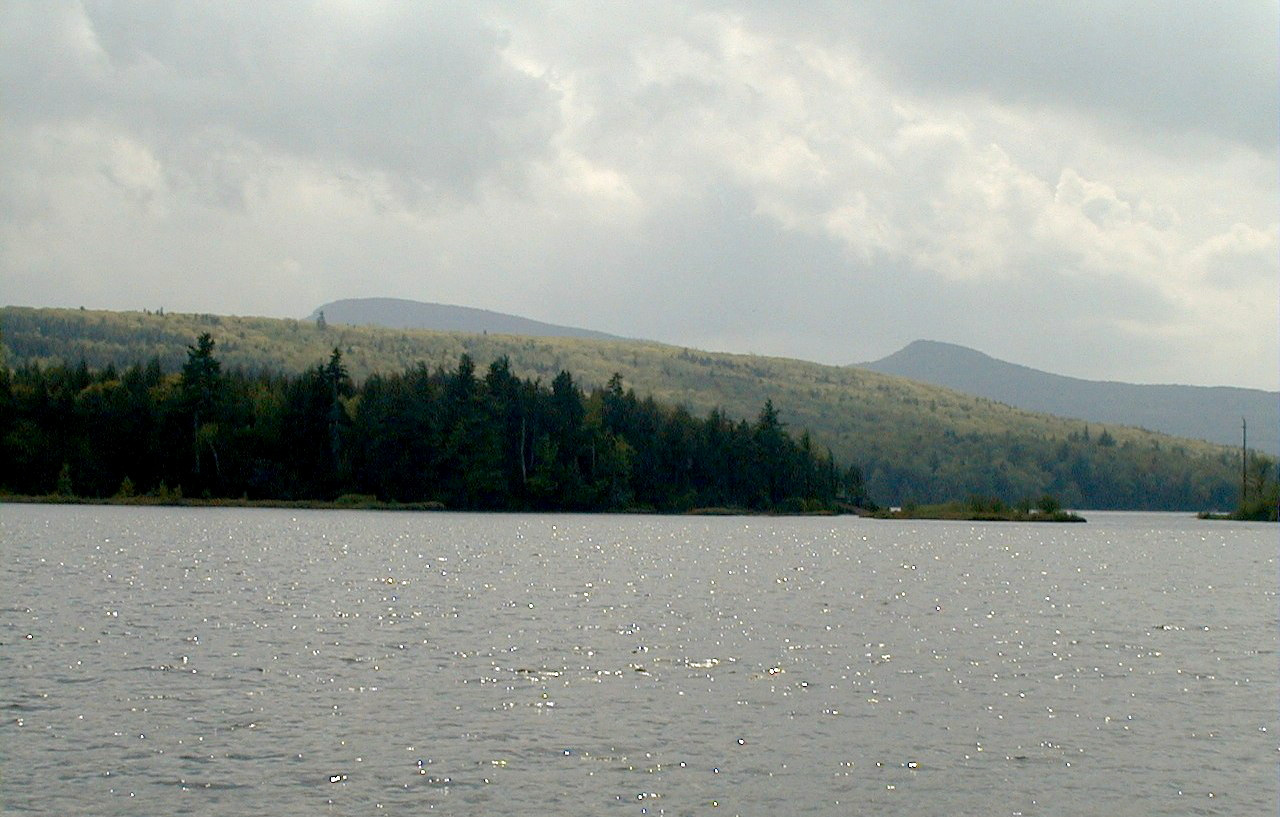
North-South Lake

The campground now plays host to 219 sites and thousands of visitors, both day and overnight, annually. It is the most popular state property in the Catskill Park.

Visitors can choose from a wide array of recreation, either waterborne or land-based. The most common activity is hiking. Trails in the area visit points of interest such as the ruins of the Kaaterskill and the Mountain House, Kaaterskill Falls, Mary's Glen and its smaller waterfall, and the many views of the Hudson Valley along the Escarpment Trail. The latter retain names from the 19th century such as "Artists' Rock." Some have etchings dating back to those days as well.

The hardiest visitors usually take in the trip up North Mountain to the views at North Point.

Closer to the ground, there are also many clever balanced-rock displays made by hotel guests. One rarely missed is Alligator Rock, in which a pair of glacial erratics that formed an open mouth had "teeth" added over the years so it looks like an alligator's open mouth.

DEC charges a $10 fee per car for day users of the campground between May and October.

North–South Lake was used in the music video by the band Simple Minds for their song Alive and Kicking. The song reached No.3 on the US Billboard.

== See also ==
- Catskill Mountains
- History of the Catskill Mountains
