= Cairo Round Top =

Mountain in New York, United States

- Location within New York Adirondack Park Location within the United States

Highest point
- Elevation: 1,434 feet (437 m)
- Coordinates: 42°15′32″N 73°59′50″W, 42°15′32″N 73°59′59″W

Geography
- Location: NNW of Lawrenceville, New York, U.S.
- Topo map(s): USGS Leeds, Freehold

Cairo Round Top (also known as Dome Mountain or Round Top) is a mountain in Greene County, New York. It is known to local native tribes such as the Iroquois and Esopus as Wa-wan-te-pe-kook, or "Round Head Piece". Round Top is located in the Catskill Mountains south of Cairo, New York. The mountain is made primarily of Quartz Sandstone believed to have been formed roughly 400 million years ago after sediment from an ancient river hardened into rock. Around 22,000 years ago during the Last Glacial Period it is believed Round Top was completely covered by glaciers.
