= Kaaterskill High Peak =

Mountain in United States of America

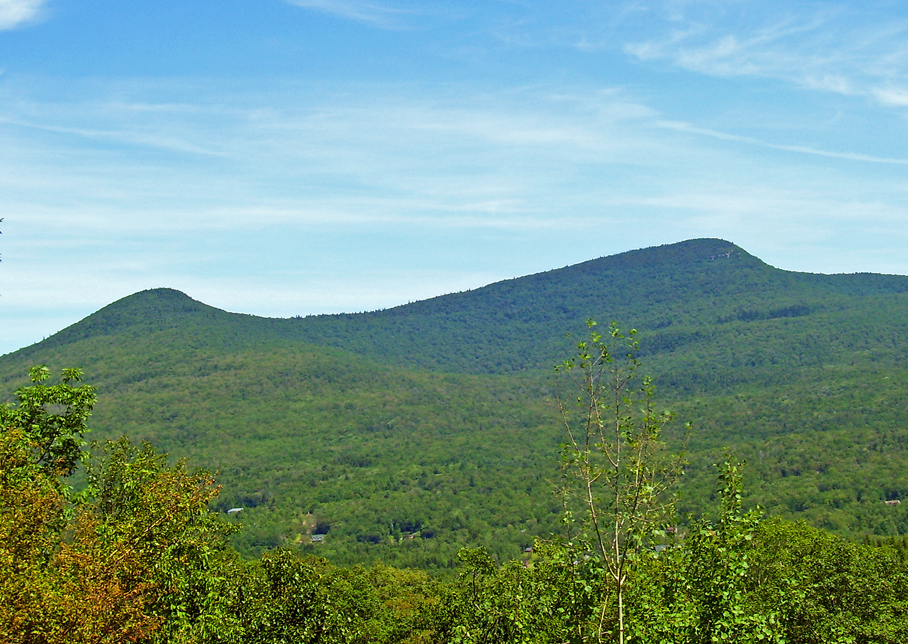
- Kaaterskill High Peak from southwest

Highest point
- Elevation: 3,655 ft (1,114 m) NAVD 88
- Prominence: 1,775 ft (541 m)
- Listing: Catskill High Peaks 22nd
- Coordinates: 42°09′44″N 74°04′48″W

Geography
- Location within New York Location within the United States
- Location: Catskills, New York, U.S.
- Parent range: Escarpment
- Topo map: USGS Kaaterskill

Climbing
- First ascent: Peter delaBigarre and companion; July 26, 1793 (recorded)
- Easiest route: trail, path

Kaaterskill High Peak (officially just High Peak) is one of the Catskill Mountains, located in the Town of Hunter in Greene County, New York, United States. It was once believed to be the highest peak in the entire range, but its summit, at 3,655 feet (1,114 m) in elevation, places it only 23rd among the Catskill High Peaks. It is, however, the fourth most prominent peak in the range. Due to its situation as the easternmost High Peak, its summit is just outside the watersheds of New York City's reservoirs in the region.

Along with Round Top to the west, its distinctive ridgeline is a visual signature of the Catskills. Even today, it dominates the view of the range from the Hudson Valley. In the early 19th century, it was a frequent subject of works by Thomas Cole and other artists of the Hudson River School. Their works helped establish the Catskill Mountain House and other hotels around North-South Lake as the fashionable summer vacation spot for wealthy Americans of the era.

Despite that popularity, the mountain was admired from afar more often than it was climbed. Although it boasts the earliest recorded ascent of any Catskill peak, today it seems somewhat neglected, lacking an official trail to its summit. However, a well-used path does exist, and perhaps because of the light use the mountain gets it is very popular with the area's serious hikers, due to the views available from Hurricane Ledge south of the summit, and several other points of interest in the vicinity of the mountain.

== Name ==
Originally, High Peak and Round Top had each other's names, due to the clear difference in topography between their summits. However, since what was called Round Top is clearly the higher of the two, confusion developed over which of the two peaks was really "High Peak". In the late 19th century, the higher peak officially became High Peak and the lower one Round Top. The "Kaaterskill" is from the nearby creek and clove, in order to distinguish it from other "High Peaks" and "Round Tops" in the range.

In the latter years of the 18th century, the peak was known as Liberty Cap for its similarity to the Phrygian cap popular during the American and French revolutions.

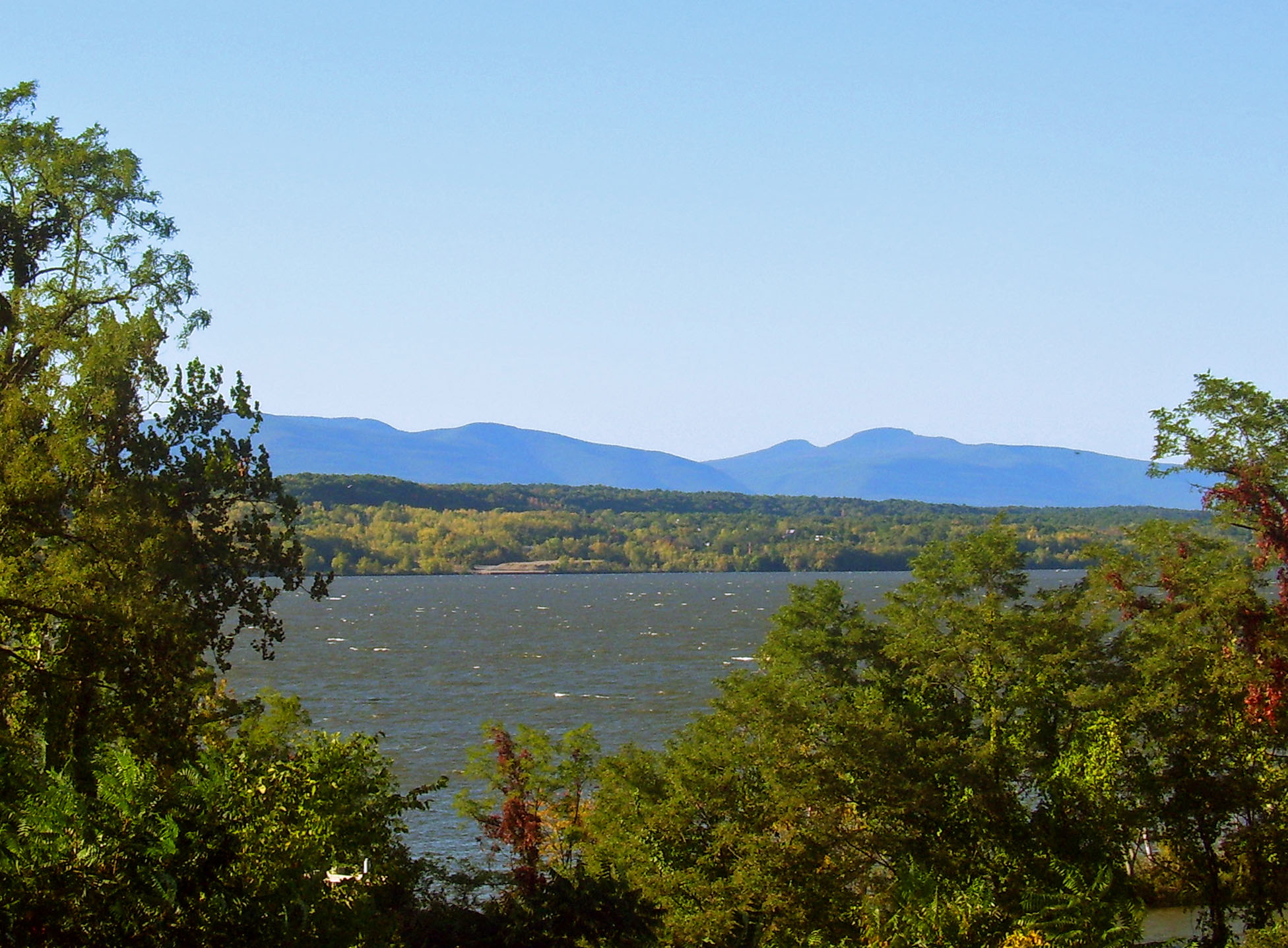
View of Catskill Escarpment from across Hudson, with High Peak predominant.

== Geography ==
High Peak stands slightly apart from other major peaks in the Catskills, squarely in the middle of the Catskill Escarpment, the sudden rise of the peaks from the Hudson Valley floor. From the valley, it is easy to understand how it came to be seen as the highest peak in the Catskills, since there are no higher peaks close to it. It is bracketed by the only two gaps in the Escarpment — Platte Clove to the south and Kaaterskill Clove to the north.

As a mountain High Peak is somewhat unusual. Its slopes are spread out and rise gently for some distance, then a bit more steeply, to the summit dome, which is surrounded by rock cliffs at about 3,500 feet (1,100 m) in elevation. Above them the ground again curves gently upward to the summit, roughly at the dome's center.

Drainage from the north flows into Kaaterskill Creek, from the south to Plattekill Creek, both of which reach the Hudson River shortly afterwards without any major impoundment.

While High Peak is not among the highest Catskill peaks, because of its distance from other major peaks it ranks fourth in topographic prominence, after Slide Mountain, Hunter Mountain and Black Dome. High Peak's summit rises 1,775 feet (541 m) from the lowest elevation contour line that encircles it.

=== Round Top ===
The former High Peak, now Round Top, is an approximately 3,440-foot (1,050 m) summit located roughly a mile (1.6 km) west of High Peak's summit. While its distance and vertical separation from the col between the two qualify it as a separate peak entirely, it remains strongly enough associated with High Peak that it is often treated as its lower summit.

== History ==
The first recorded ascent of Kaaterskill High Peak took place on July 26, 1793, when Peter DeLaBigarre, a French "agent" and frequent visitor to the nearby Clermont estate of Chancellor Robert Livingston, who published him regularly in Transactions, the journal of the Society for the Promotion of Agriculture, Arts and Manufactures. One of DeLaBigarre's accounts in 1794 described his adventures in the Catskills the year before. Most of his narrative was given over to a springtime trip to Overlook Mountain and North-South Lake, but on the later day he records that he brought a "natural philosopher" friend along with a barometer and climbed "Round Top", which he believed to be the highest Catskill peak, renaming it Liberty Cap in honor of the political change in his homeland. The companion determined the mountain's summit to be 3,549 feet (1,082 m) above sea level, only about 106 feet (32 m) short of its accepted elevation today. This is the earliest recorded climb of any Catskill High Peak.

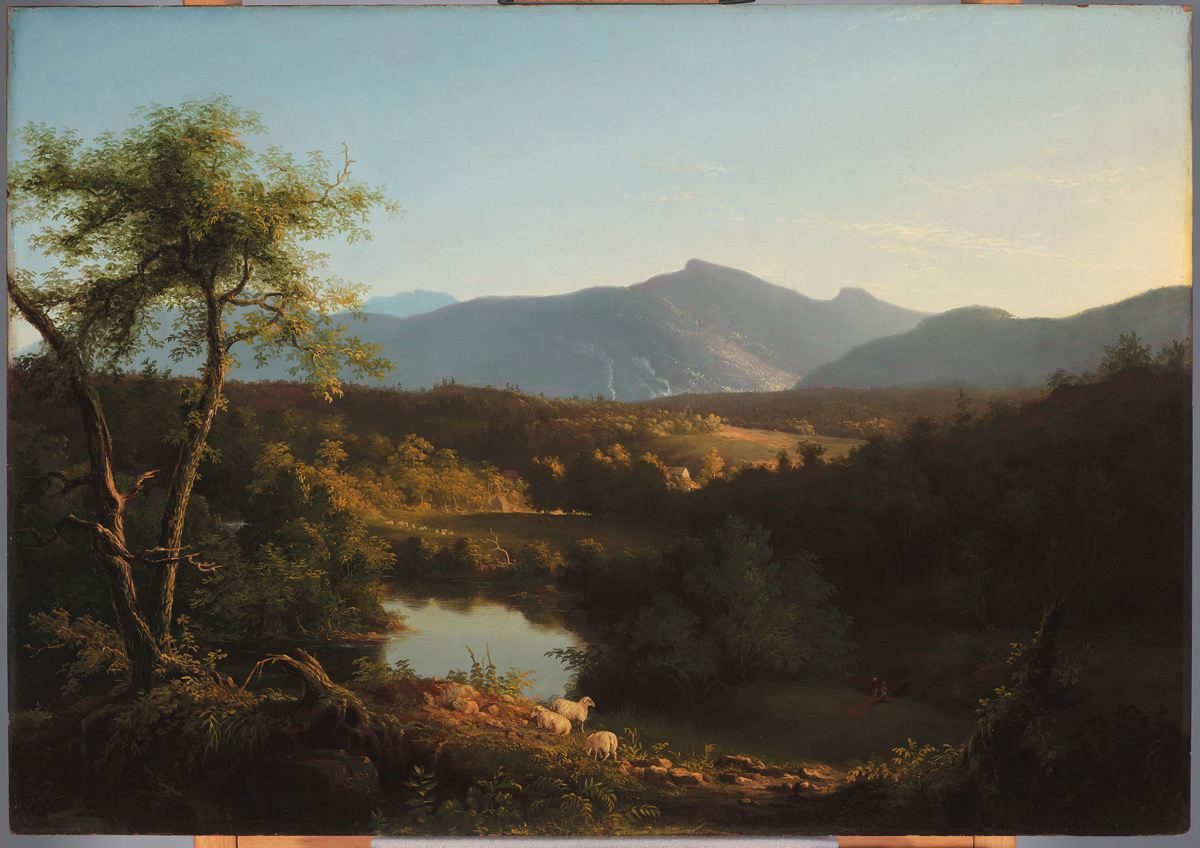
View Near the Village of Catskill, by Thomas Cole, 1827. One of his many paintings to feature High Peak and Round Top.

His visit and account laid the groundwork for the early years of the next century, when a young Thomas Cole would visit the Catskill Mountain House and devote much of his groundbreaking Hudson River School paintings to depictions of the Catskill wilderness. High Peak, visible from the Mountain House as well as from the studio and home he built in Catskill, would frequently show up in the background. The popularity of his art in turn brought more guests to the Mountain House (and later, the Kaaterskill and Laurel hotels) to see it for themselves.

One of those visitors, Princeton geography professor Arnold Henry Guyot, spent much of his summers in the early 1870s striking out to other mountains in the region. He easily became convinced that High Peak was not, as the hoteliers claimed, the high peak of the Catskills. His candidates turned first to other popular local suspects such as Black Dome (known as "Black Top" at the time), then Hunter Mountain and finally to Slide Mountain, in an inland area to the southwest known at the time as the Shandaken Mountains and dismissed by the hotelkeepers as a different range entirely.

He brought his surveying equipment and assistants along, and wound up producing the first accurate map of the Catskill Mountains. Slide's 4,180 feet (1,270 m) put it well above High Peak, now consigned to 23rd on his list (he would also pioneer the switch in names between High Peak and Round Top, once he had established which was higher) The resort owners protested and tried to discredit his findings, but they were solid and by 1879 other surveyors had confirmed them. When New York established its Forest Preserve several years later, a delegation from the state forestry board commemorated the event by climbing Slide, not High Peak. A privately owned observation tower and neighboring two-story building were built on the summit in the late 19th century, but seem to have been removed sometime around state acquisition of the property two decades later.

Attention paid to the mountain dwindled, and even today it has no officially maintained trail over its summit, though the "unofficial" Twilight Trail remains well-used and is blazed along most its length. In 1921 both High Peak and Round Top were added to the Forest Preserve.

The south slope of the mountain has seen some development and habitation over the years. A former New York City Police Department camp near the top of Platte Clove was proposed as a site for a prison when it was abandoned in the 1970s, but the plan was dropped after local opposition. Today it is one of the Bruderhof Communities. There are still some private landholdings in the area.

A half-mile (1 km) horse-drawn railroad was once constructed on the south slopes below the col, following the brook by Byrne Road, to haul logs out of the area. Remnants of its steel-topped wooden rails can still be found.

On the north slope, at the precarious head of Kaaterskill Clove, is the community of Twilight Park.

Two small airplanes crashed on the mountain in the later years of the 20th century. One of them, on June 13, 1967, resulted in two fatalities when a twin engine Piper PA-23-250 Aztec flew into a ledge just below summit in adverse weather conditions. The remains can still be found to the east of the summit. The second crash occurred on June 25, 1987 when a Piper Pa-32R-300 flew into trees on east side of the mountain at about 3,080 feet (940 m). The remains can be found along the snowmobile trail loop.

The small Cortina Valley ski area, started in 1975 tried to make a go of it under several different ownerships on the northwestern slope of Round Top, but went out of business for good around 2000. The three trails still remain.

At some point, the state built a snowmobile loop around both peaks, starting at the top of Platte Clove and leveling out at 3,200 feet (980 m). However, it sees little snowmobiler use even in the most severe winters. Recent proposed changes to the Catskill State Land Master Plan could result in the end of this designation.

More of the mountain has been added to the Forest Preserve over the years. It is managed by the New York State Department of Environmental Conservation as part of the Kaaterskill Wild Forest management unit in Catskill Park.

== Natural environment ==
Typically for the Catskills, High Peak and much of the state land around it are covered with a northern-hardwood slope forest in which beech, birch and maple predominate. The summit dome of both High Peak and Round Top are likewise home to a boreal forest of balsam fir and red spruce, with paper birch as a deciduous associate species. Despite the heavy development of the mountain, much of the forest above 3,000 feet (910 m) is first-growth.

Spruce, fir and pines also predominate in an area called Pine Plains, roughly due east and east-northeast of the summit, just below 3,000 feet (910 m) near high ground along the Escarpment. Poor drainage here gives these species opportunities they would not otherwise have at that point. It remains wet and muddy even through dry weather, and in late spring it is often one of the best places to see some of the wildflower species of the Catskills, such as trillium and clintonia.

== Approaches ==
Two approaches to the mountain are used for almost all trips, both making use of sections of the Long Path long-distance hiking trail. The southern route is still overwhelmingly preferred due to its gentle, almost level climb for much of its distance, allowing hikers to build up a good pace for a determined take on the summit. The northern route passes several scenic waterfalls and overlooks and requires almost 3,000 feet (910 m) of elevation gain, the most possible on any route up a major Catskill peak.

A shorter third route from the south is possible if permission to cross private land is obtained first. All depend to some extent on the snowmobile trail. The unofficial Twilight Park Trail (named for a private residential community at the head of Kaaterskill Clove, at its northern end) is used in all cases to gain the summit.

=== Southern route ===
Starting from the trailhead parking lot at the top of Platte Clove, recently expanded by NYSDEC, hikers follow the old Steenburg Road, now the snowmobile trail, blazed both with large orange plastic discs for snowmobiles (rarely seen) and smaller blue ones for foot users (A color given on all DEC lands to sections of the Long Path not part of other designated trails). The cascades of a nearby tributary of Platte Creek beckon through hemlock stands, but are on private land. Vehicle tracks can still be seen as there are several forks leading to private homes in the area, usually chained off. Elevation gain is noticeable, but comes at a slight though steady pace.

At the last fork, a mile (1.6 km) from the trailhead a state sign indicates the distances to Palenville, the next place the Long Path reaches civilization, and other points of interest on the far side of the mountain. From this point on the trail becomes narrower as it is barred to all other motor vehicles, and starts to curve to the northeast, into state land. A yellow-blazed spur, the former Nature Friends Trail, only recently added to the state system, leads to the scenic Huckleberry Point overlook after a while.

The travel levels off from its gentle climb, and starts heading due north, as it crosses some brooks and the hemlock stands around them. Postings marking the back bounds of some private lots are still visible through the distance, as are some unauthorized trails to those lands. Finally some more gentle ascending into a more beech-dominant forest heralds the beginning of Pine Plains, 1.25 miles (2.01 km) from the Huckleberry Point junction, as the trail also begins to curve to the west.

Spruce, fir and other evergreens become much more common in this environment, where the trail is often wet. However, the scenery affords hikers with potential wildflower sightings here in the late spring.

Beyond Pine Plains, the forest returns to a more deciduous character as the trail remains level while becoming decidedly westward in heading, crossing many rivulets or streambeds, some offering picturesque mini-cascades of their own. Finally, at a junction 3.7 miles (6.0 km) from the trailhead, the Long Path drops down into Kaaterskill Clove while the snowmobile route heads up a slightly steeper slope. After several hundred feet (about a hundred meters), it reaches the loop.

From here, hikers can take one of two routes: either turn right (west), walk several hundred yards, and look for a pair of cairns in the woods on your left marking the north end of the Twilight Park Trail (not yet official, but well-marked) OR turn left and proceed around the mountain, past one of the plane wrecks. As the path curves to the right, you will eventually encounter a 5-foot-high (1.5 m) cairn in the middle of the path marking the south end of the Twilight Park Trail. A combination of smaller cairns, surveyor's tape flags and old blue paint blazes have been used by various maintainers over the years to keep this wet and sometimes hard-to-spot route marked. While not steep, it is almost constantly ascending, responsible for the last 450 vertical feet up the mountain in less than a mile. The southerly approach is probably best, since the steepest portions of the ascent are to the south and are best handled going up rather than down.

It begins by winding through the notably scrubbier woods of these slopes before finally settling for a traverse up past some impressive rock outcrops, where it becomes more heavily trodden and easier to follow. Finally, just above 3,500 feet (1,100 m), it reaches a short but steep open rock face that requires some scrambling to reward the climber with a view to the north of the Blackhead Range, over Kaaterskill Clove, with Kaaterskill Falls clearly visible below.

Beyond it the path becomes even more obvious as the surrounding forest becomes totally boreal, with spruce and fir in every direction. Some gentle ascents alternate with level stretches before a last ascent into the small, viewless summit clearing. Distance is roughly 5 miles (8.0 km) from the trailhead, with a vertical gain of 1,455 feet (443 m).

Upon return, some hikers using this route prefer to either continue south along the Twilight Park Trail to the loop, or remain on the loop (which is often as wet as Pine Plains below it) to the plane wreckage at the loop's southeastern corner and bushwhack from there down to the trail just past Pine Plains in order to save some time and distance.

=== Northern approach ===
The northern route begins at the parking area along Malden Avenue in Palenville, just off New York State Route 23A. A woods road with the aqua blazes of the Long Path begins just past its end. It ascends, steadily and sometimes steeply, for two miles (3.2 km) up the side of Kaaterskill Clove. The trail switches back at the top of a small rise and begins to descend slightly to the two streams at the base of Hillyer Ravine.

After a half-mile (1 km) ascent, the trail reaches Wildcat Falls, where a ledge offers an excellent view down into Kaaterskill Clove. Another half-mile produces Buttermilk Falls, a two-step waterfall just off-trail. Just 0.2 miles (320 m) later, the old road ends and the trail begins to seriously climb over some steep slopes and narrow ledges. This continues for 0.65 miles (1.05 km) before joining the Twilight Park Trail. The junction with the snowmobile trail is another 0.2-mile (0.32 km) uphill.

Via this route, it is approximately 7 miles (11 km) to the summit and 2,990 vertical feet (911 m).

=== Alternate southern approach ===
With permission from private landowners on the south slope a party can begin from the vicinity of Josh Road and follow the southern end of the Twilight Park Trail or forks of it up the mountain for the highest possible starting elevation. The trail is marked and even signed as it passes through some picturesque maple forests into state land, reaching the snowmobile trail at another cairned junction.

The ascent from that point follows the same route and terrain described in the southern approach above.

=== Other possible routes ===
Sometimes the summit is approached from Round Top by staying along the ridgeline, during trips where both peaks are climbed. Daring hikers sometimes bushwhack straight up from the loop plane crash to the other one, on the cliffs east of the summit. This requires going over a series of outcrops with risks similar to those found to the south of the summit. It is also possible to make a long approach from the northwest via unmarked trail through Cortina Valley (past the former ski resort). The chief challenge in following this route is routefinding on the ledges to the northeast of Round Top, where the unwary hiker can easily reach a dead end and have to backtrack.

== Summit ==
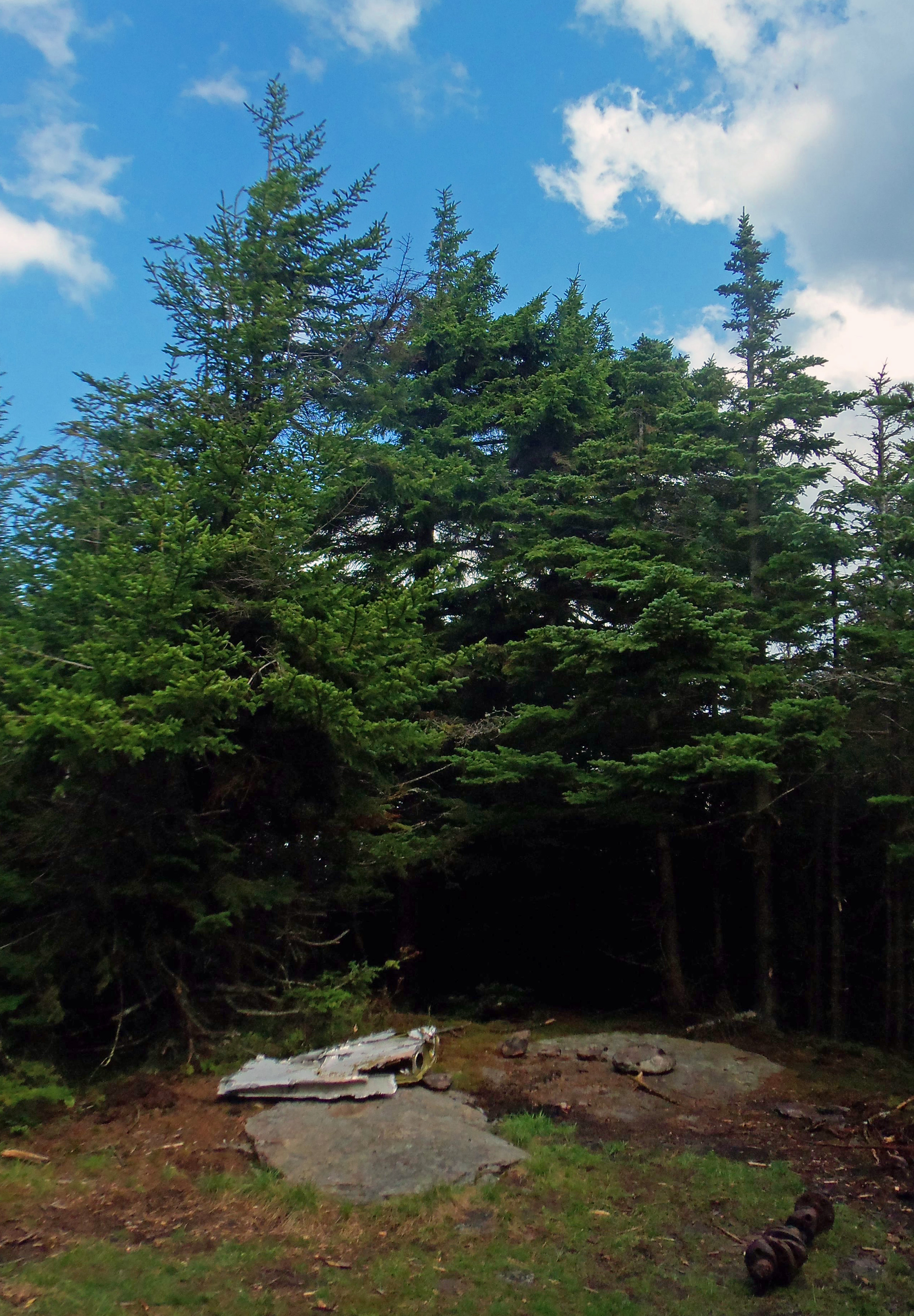
Summit, with debris from nearby plane wreck.

The summit of Kaaterskill High Peak is a small, viewless grassy clearing surrounded by boreal forest. A rock in the center holds a reference marker for two nearby United States Geological Survey benchmarks at the 3,655-foot (1,114 m) elevation marking the highest point on the mountain; the bolts themselves are on rocks in the nearby woods (one is on the southern trail five feet from the peak, the other is about 10 feet (3.0 m) to the south in the woods).

== Points of interest ==
Several other attractions on and around High Peak, besides its summit, have drawn hikers to the mountain and been the subject of detours.

=== Hurricane Ledge ===
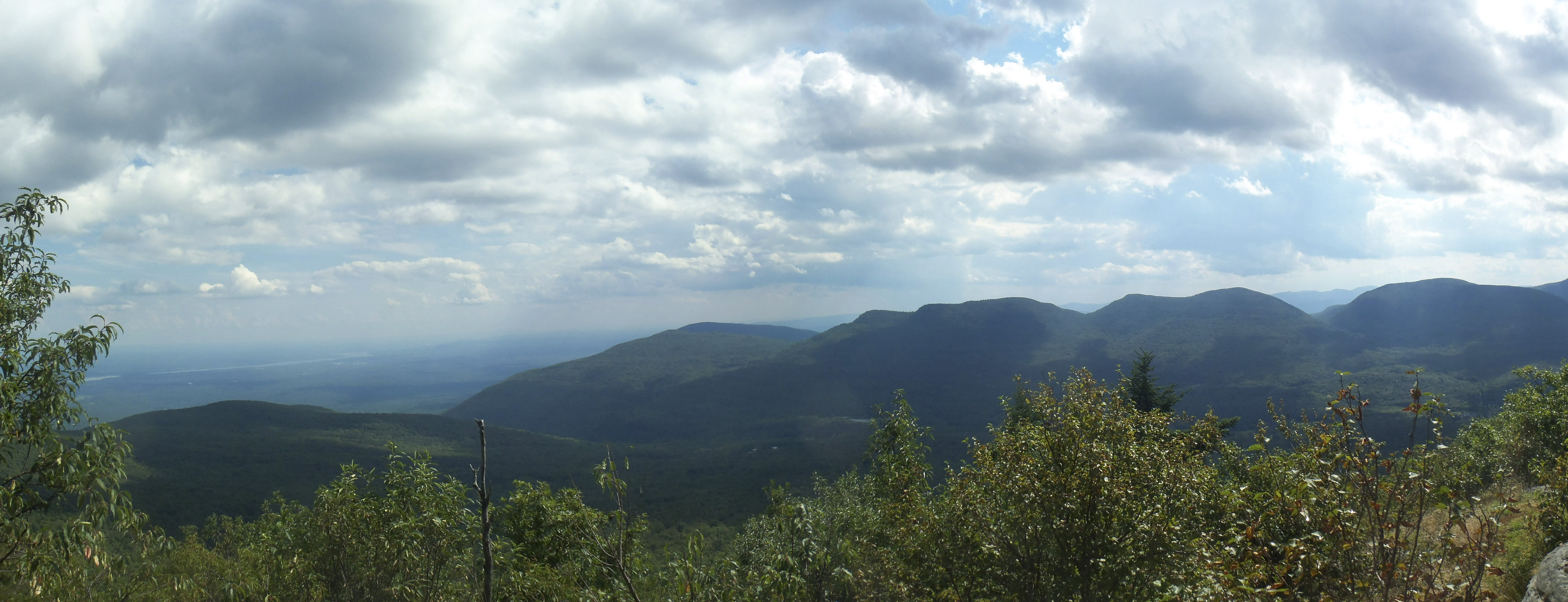
View from Hurricane Ledge

Since the summit offers no views, most hikers choose to take their reward at this wide, open area above a sheer cliff on the south side of the mountain about 0.1 miles (160 m) from the summit. Indian Head and Twin mountains in the Devil's Path can be seen to the immediate south (the latter's summit appearing lower than High Peak even though it is not), with Plateau bookending them to the west. On the east, the Catskills drop away dramatically into the clove and a long section of the Hudson is visible.

The area is named either for the 1950 storm that supposedly cleared the view by blowing most of the trees down, or for the strong winds felt due to the absence of trees. It is the only area of the Catskills that feels as if it were above tree line.

=== Huckleberry Point ===
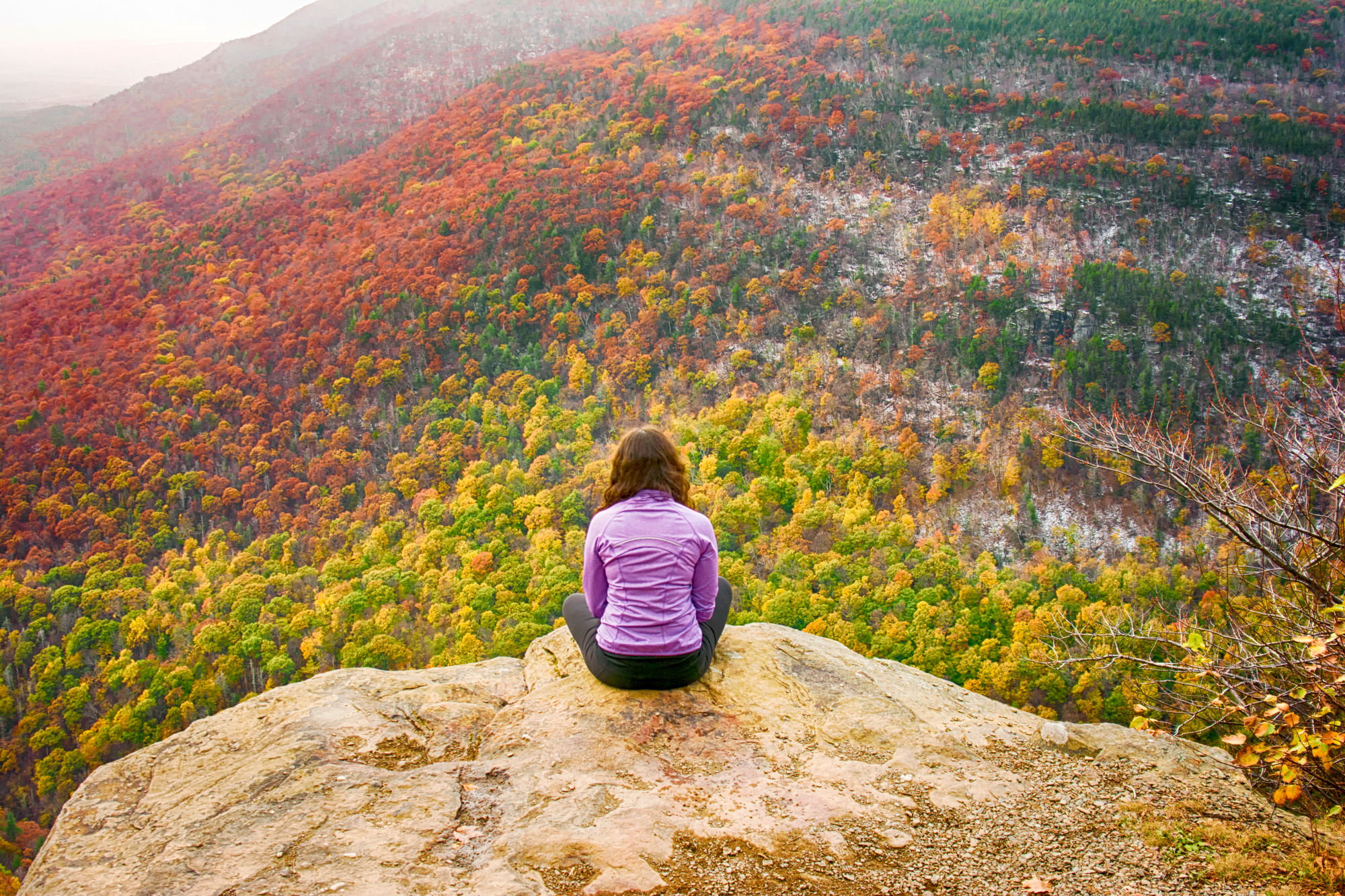
A view from Huckleberry point.

The trail that splits from the snowmobile route a mile from the Platte Clove trailhead curves back another mile or so to Huckleberry Point, a steep and ledgy area which, due to past fires, offers many places to sit back and look down into the clove. Since the route is mostly level, and the roundtrip considerably shorter than that required for the whole mountain, it is popular with those who hike only occasionally. Care must be taken at the Point, however, since some of the ledges also sit above sharp drops.

=== Round Top ===
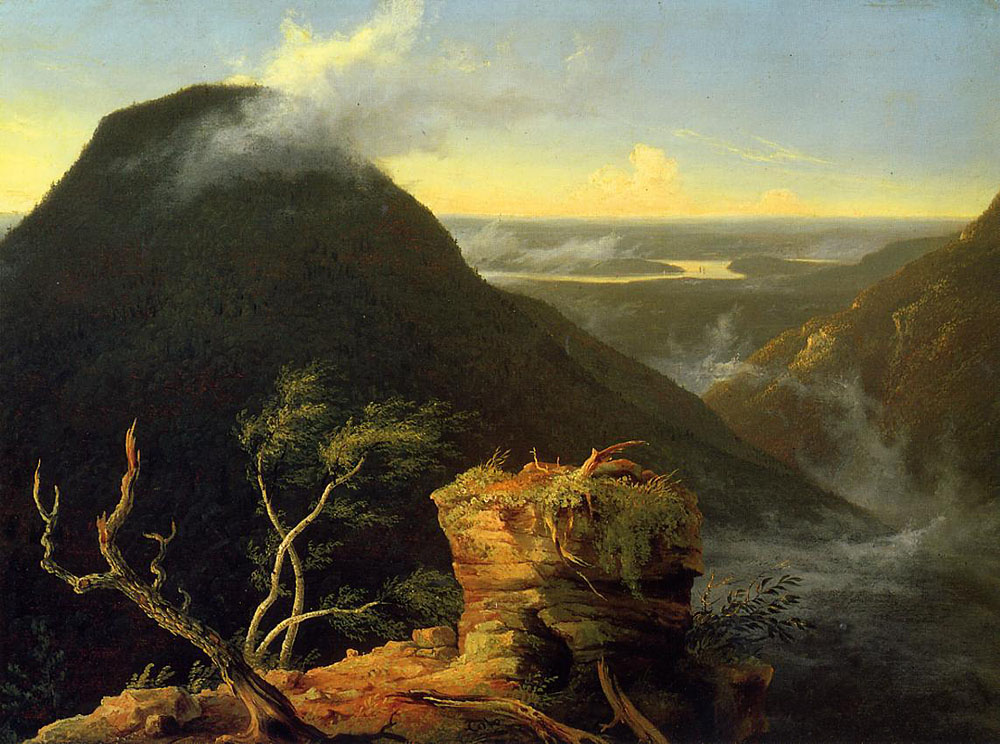
Thomas Cole's Sunny Morning on the Hudson River, a stylized representation of the view of High Peak from Round Top (known by each other's name in his time).

Due to the easier routes available at the time, Cole and his contemporaries would prefer to climb this peak and sketch the views. Some of the views they came back with found their way into paintings, most notably Sunny Morning on the Hudson River. Since then, Round Top has fallen out of favor even more than High Peak but is still among the fifty highest peaks in the Catskills, and thus visited by some even more determined peak baggers. Its summit can be reached by use paths similar to those on its neighbor (although unmaintained), from the snowmobile trail near Cortina Valley.

=== Brant Fort ===
An old fort can be found south of the col between High Peak and Round Top at 2,540 feet (770 m) in elevation. Built at first by British troops during the French and Indian War, it was most famously used by Tories and their Indian allies later during the Revolutionary War (in the early years of which pro-British sentiment was quite common in the region, as many of its tenant farmers despised their pro-independence landlords). From that vantage point they could see down into Platte Clove and keep an eye on troop movements in the valley (likewise strongly pro-Patriot).

It was often the first stop for many taken prisoner during engagements in the region who were later transported to what is now Canada to be exchanged, paroled or ransomed, as reported in many captivity narratives. Joseph Brant, the legendary Indian warrior who fought for the British, stopped by for a visit once, giving rise in later years to legends that he based his fearsome raids here. The fort has been informally named for him ever since even though his real involvement with it was minimal.

=== Plane crash sites ===
The many aviation accidents in the Catskills have long been an attraction to hikers seeking a bushwhacking and orienteering challenge. The lower of the two on High Peak is one of the more easily reached since it sits right on the snowmobile loop, and much of the fuselage remains since removing the wreckage is not a priority for NYSDEC and its limited funding. It was briefly the site of a geocache, but DEC removed it as it was prohibited by Forest Preserve regulations.

The upper one is more of a challenge to find due to its location on the cliffs east of the summit. Faint paths can be followed to it, however, and a small piece of it was for a long time placed on the rock with the reference marker at the summit.
