= Johannes Hardenbergh =

Landowner (1670–1745)

Major Johannes Hardenbergh (1670–1745), also known as Sir Johannes Hardenbergh, was the owner of the Hardenbergh patent of land in the Catskill Mountains of New York, United States.

== Biography ==
He was born in Albany, New York, in 1670. His father's name was Gerrit, and he married Catherine Rutsen. He was Sheriff of Ulster County, New York in 1709. He served as a Major in the Ulster County Regiment.

In 1706, Hardenbergh bought the immense tract of land since known as the "Hardenbergh patent", which covered some 2,000,000 acres (8,100 km^{2}) of the Catskill Mountains in what is today Sullivan, Ulster and Delaware counties, from Nanisinos, sachem of the Esopus Indians, for the sum of 60 pounds. The purchase was subsequently confirmed and patent was granted to Hardenbergh and six others in 1708. There were some disputes as to whether Hardenbergh's acquisition of the property had been truly legal. Indeed, in 1769 another former British officer, John Bradstreet, filed a claim to 50,000 acres (200 km^{2}) based on that very assumption.

Shares in the patent changed hands frequently, and the terms under which the land was sold or leased were so varied and complex that it impeded settlement of the district and clouded the title to most of its tracts until well after the American Revolution.

He died in 1745.

== Descendants ==
- Colonel Johannes Hardenbergh Jr. (1706–1786), a field officer under Washington in the Continental Army, served in New York's Colonial Assembly, was Hardenbergh's son.
- The Reverend Jacob Rutsen Hardenbergh (1735/6-1790), Dutch Reformed clergyman, first president of Queen's College (now Rutgers University), member of the Provincial Congress of New Jersey and New Jersey General Assembly during the American Revolution, was his grandson.
- Henry Janeway Hardenbergh (1847–1918), 4x great-grandson, was a prominent architect in New York City in the late 19th and early 20th centuries.
- Jacob Hardenbergh (1823–1872), 3x great-grandson, was a lawyer and politician in New York.

== See also ==
- History of the Catskill Mountains
