= New York State Route 32A =

Highway in New York

New York State Route 32A
- Map of Hudson Valley in eastern New York with NY 32A highlighted in red

Route information
- Auxiliary route of NY 32
- Maintained by NYSDOT
- Length: 1.92 mi (3.09 km)
- Existed: early 1940s–present

Major junctions
- South end: NY 32 in Saugerties
- North end: NY 23A in Catskill

Location
- Country: United States
- State: New York
- Counties: Ulster, Greene

Highway system
- New York Highways; Interstate; US; State; Reference; Parkways
← NY 32	→ NY 32B

New York State Route 32A (NY 32A) is a state highway in the Hudson Valley region of New York in the United States. It serves as a connector between NY 32 in the town of Saugerties and NY 23A in the town of Catskill. The road allows traffic from the Saugerties area, particularly from the New York State Thruway, to directly reach the interior of the Greene County portion of Catskill Park. The majority of traffic is tourism-oriented, from hikers in summer to skiers bound for Hunter Mountain in winter. If NY 32A did not exist, drivers would have to go several miles out of their way to the intersection of NY 32 and NY 23A.

== Route description ==
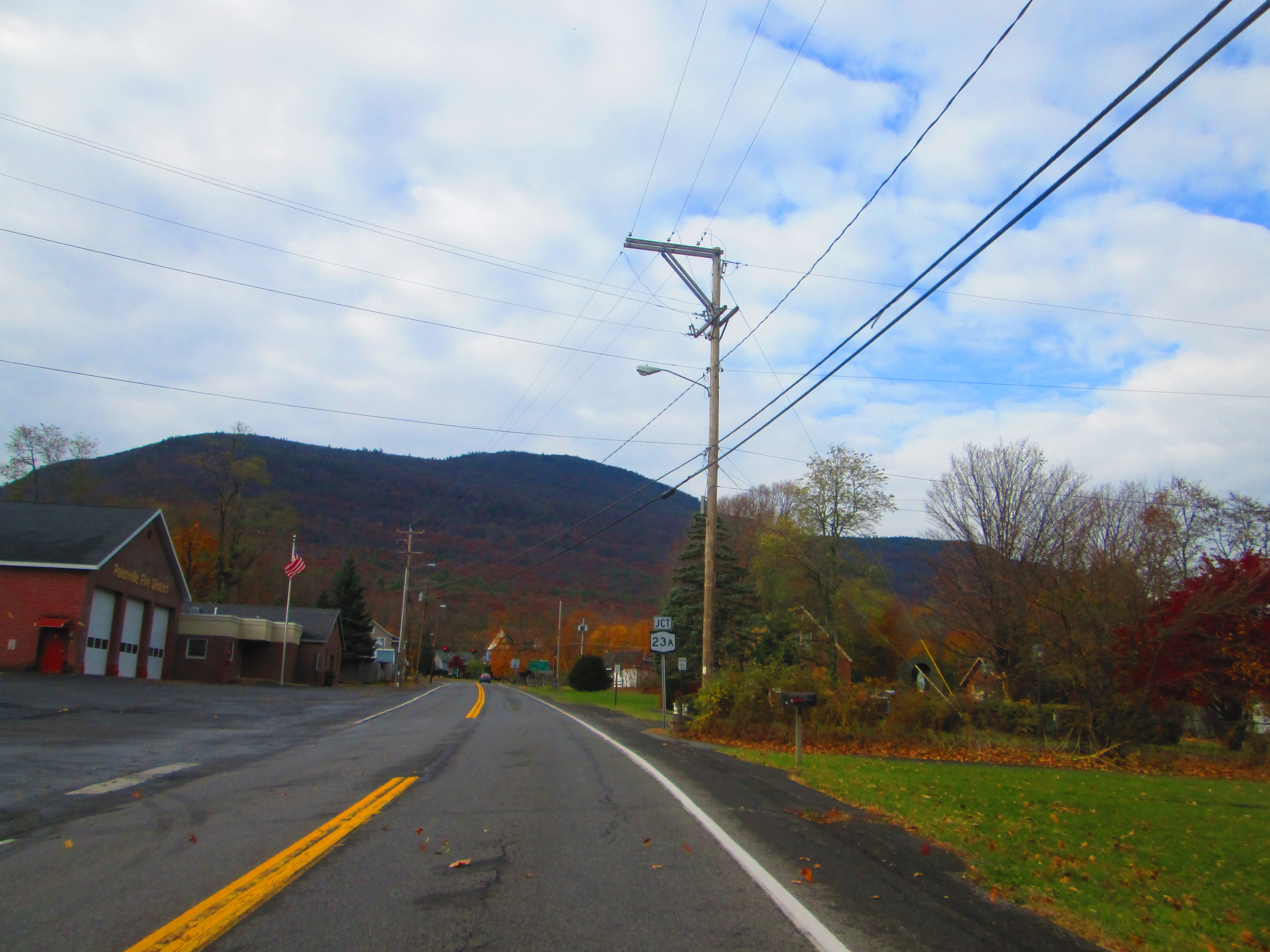
NY 32A northbound approaching NY 23A in Palenville

NY 32A forks off to the west-northwest from NY 32 at a junction in the Ulster County town of Saugerties, seven miles (11 km) southwest of New York State Thruway exit 20. The two-lane route runs on level ground, although the Catskill Escarpment looms to the west from many open areas. Heading away from NY 32, the first mile (1.6 km) of the route traverses mostly wooded areas, although there are some open fields near the NY 32 intersection. The road soon begins to run along the south side of Kaaterskill Creek, and NY 32A follows the stream across the nearby Ulster–Greene county line and into the hamlet of Palenville.

In Palenville, the highway initially serves a handful of scattered homes on the south bank of Kaaterskill Creek. After several blocks, NY 32A briefly turns northward to cross the creek and reach Palenville's small central business district. Here, the route passes Palenville's fire department before ending at a signalized intersection with NY 23A across from the National Register of Historic Places-listed Rowena Memorial School. The junction lies just east of the Catskill Park Blue Line and NY 23A's long climb up Kaaterskill Clove toward the Catskill High Peaks.

== History ==
The origins of NY 32A date back to the 1920s when the highway was acquired by the state of New York and first improved to state highway standards. In the 1930 renumbering of state highways in New York, the road became part of the new NY 32, which initially had a gap in the route between Palenville and Cairo. The gap was filled in the early 1940s by a new highway extending from Cairo to a point southeast of Palenville. NY 32 was realigned to bypass Palenville on the new road while its former routing into the hamlet was redesignated as NY 32A.

== Major intersections ==
County	Location	mi	km	Destinations	Notes
Ulster	Town of Saugerties	0.00	0.00	NY 32 – Cairo, Saugerties	Southern terminus; hamlet of Saxton
Greene	Town of Catskill	1.92	3.09	NY 23A – Tannersville, Hunter, Catskill	Northern terminus; hamlet of Palenville
1.000 mi = 1.609 km; 1.000 km = 0.621 mi
