= Kaaterskill =

Kaaterskill may refer to:

- Kaaterskill Clove, a deep gorge, or valley, in New York's eastern Catskill Mountains
- Kaaterskill Creek, a tributary of Catskill Creek
- Kaaterskill Falls (disambiguation)
- Kaaterskill High Peak, one of the Catskill Mountains
- Kaaterskill Junction Railroad Station
- Kaaterskill Railroad
- Kaaterskill Railroad Station
- Kaaterskill (ship, 1882), paddle steamer
