= New York State Route 23A =

State highway in Greene County, New York, US

New York State Route 23A
- Map of Greene County in eastern New York with NY 23A highlighted in red

Route information
- Auxiliary route of NY 23
- Maintained by NYSDOT
- Length: 34.56 mi (55.62 km)
- Existed: mid-1920s–present

Major junctions
- West end: NY 23 in Prattsville
- East end: US 9W in Catskill

Location
- Country: United States
- State: New York
- Counties: Greene

Highway system
- New York Highways; Interstate; US; State; Reference; Parkways
← NY 23	→ NY 23B

New York State Route 23A (NY 23A) is an east–west state highway in Greene County, New York, in the United States. It serves as a 34.56-mile (55.62 km) alternate route of NY 23 through the northern Catskill Mountains. The route passes several of the Catskill High Peaks, including Hunter Mountain, before dropping into the Hudson Valley via Kaaterskill Clove and ending at an intersection with U.S. Route 9W (US 9W) in the village of Catskill. NY 23A was assigned in the mid-1920s and has not been changed since. A portion of the route through Kaaterskill Clove was closed for several months in 2006 after landslides triggered by heavy rains damaged the route.

== Route description ==
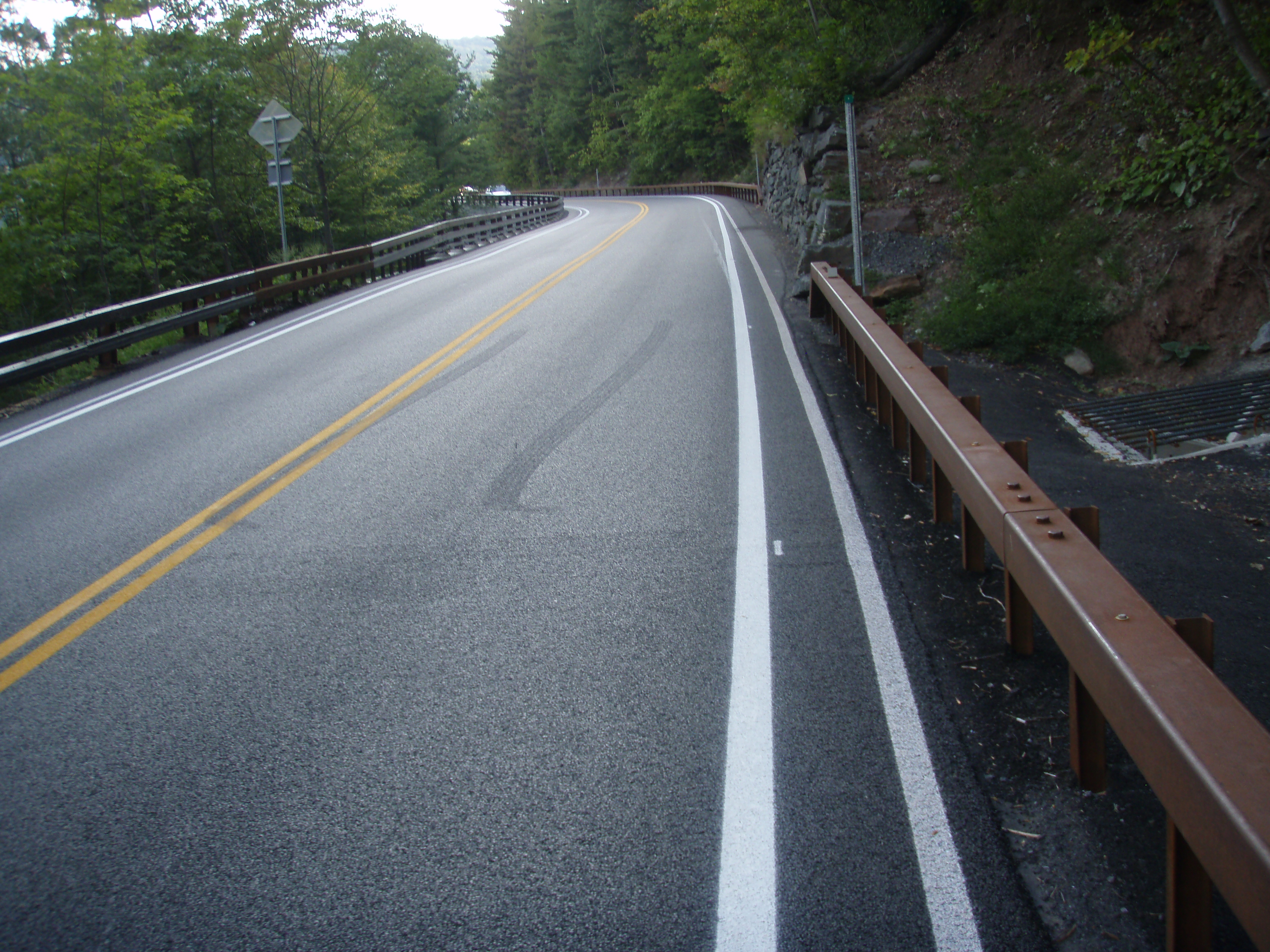
NY 23A near Kaaterskill Falls

NY 23A begins 1 mile (1.6 km) southeast of the hamlet of Prattsville at a three-way junction with NY 23 in the town of Prattsville. NY 23 enters the intersection from the northwest and turns left (east) to continue toward Windham while traffic proceeding straight through the junction is directed on NY 23A. It heads generally southward along the eastern banks of Schoharie Creek, continuing the course set by its parent route through northwestern Greene County. Along the way, the route serves numerous state-maintained parking areas providing direct access to the creek, a popular trout stream among fly fishermen. At one of these stops, it begins to run southwestward along the Blue Line delimiting the boundaries of Catskill Park. After 1 mile (1.6 km), the creek and the route turn to the east, crossing into the park limits.

Inside the park, NY 23A deviates from the creek at various points, occasionally losing sight of the waterway, but it consistently follows the creek valley of the upper Schoharie to within a few miles of its source. At the first bend taking the stream away from the road, NY 42 comes up from the hamlet of Lexington to the immediate south, the first of four state routes to terminate at NY 23A. The road, previously level, begins to climb gently and steadily as it heads away from NY 42 and into the center of Greene County. Around the crossing of the East Kill 2.5 miles (4.0 km) east of Lexington, Rusk Mountain, the first major peak, comes into view to the south. The route continues to wind its way through the town of Jewett to the western fringe of the village of Hunter, where it connects to the south end of NY 296, a connector route that leads to NY 23 north of Hensonville.

The highway continues east into Hunter, one of only a handful of communities along NY 23A, becoming the village's main street. Here, the ski trails striping the Colonel's Chair, a corner of Hunter Mountain that hosts the eponymous ski area, come into view. Traffic, usually low here, becomes heavy on weekends during ski season as commuters from outside the region head to the adjacent resort. Once past the village, the fire tower on Hunter Mountain's 4,040-foot (1,231 m) summit becomes visible to the south as the highway continues to climb in elevation. Roughly 1 mile (1.6 km) from the village limits, NY 23A connects to NY 214 at the north end of Stony Clove Notch, a narrow cleft separating Hunter Mountain from neighboring Plateau Mountain.

NY 23A's junction with NY 214 heralds the beginning of a stretch of several miles in which the creek valley provides drivers with an unobstructed view of the Devil's Path, one of the Catskills' best-known ranges. Past Plateau Mountain, the remainder of the range—Sugarloaf, Twin and Indian Head mountains—rise to the south as the road continues east. Schoharie Creek and the Devil's Path recede to the south as the highway enters the village of Tannersville. The road crests at 2,300 feet (701 m) in elevation just before exiting the village and entering the adjacent hamlet of Haines Falls. From there, a road runs north to the state campground complex near the former Catskill Mountain House site at North–South Lake.

The distinctive ridgeline of Kaaterskill High Peak and its shorter neighbor, Round Top Mountain, appear just east of the hamlet along with the dramatic drop into Kaaterskill Clove, a view that inspired many Hudson River School paintings. In the next two miles (3.2 km), NY 23A drops 2,000 feet (610 m) in elevation through this gap in the Catskill Escarpment. It passes the trailhead for Kaaterskill Falls, from where pedestrians must use the narrow shoulder of NY 23A for a considerable distance to reach the falls themselves. Below the falls are many swimming holes and the steep, rugged cliffs that line Kaaterskill Creek. The road levels off just west of Palenville, where it crosses the Long Path hiking trail and leaves the Catskill Park.

Palenville, a small hamlet at the eastern edge of the Catskill Escarpment, is marked by a traffic light at the northern end of NY 32A, a connector that shortens the trip to the Hunter–Tannersville area for those coming south on the New York State Thruway (Interstate 87). Just past the junction is Rowena Memorial School, a local landmark. Going further east, NY 23A crosses much gentler but still largely undeveloped terrain as it traverses the town of Catskill. It reaches NY 32 itself at an undeveloped intersection prior to crossing Kaaterskill Creek and the Thruway near the grades of an abandoned interchange. From the Thruway, it heads generally northeastward through a small valley to the western edge of the village of Catskill, where it ends at a junction with US 9W. Southbound US 9W is accessed by a right-hand turn, while northbound US 9W is straight ahead.

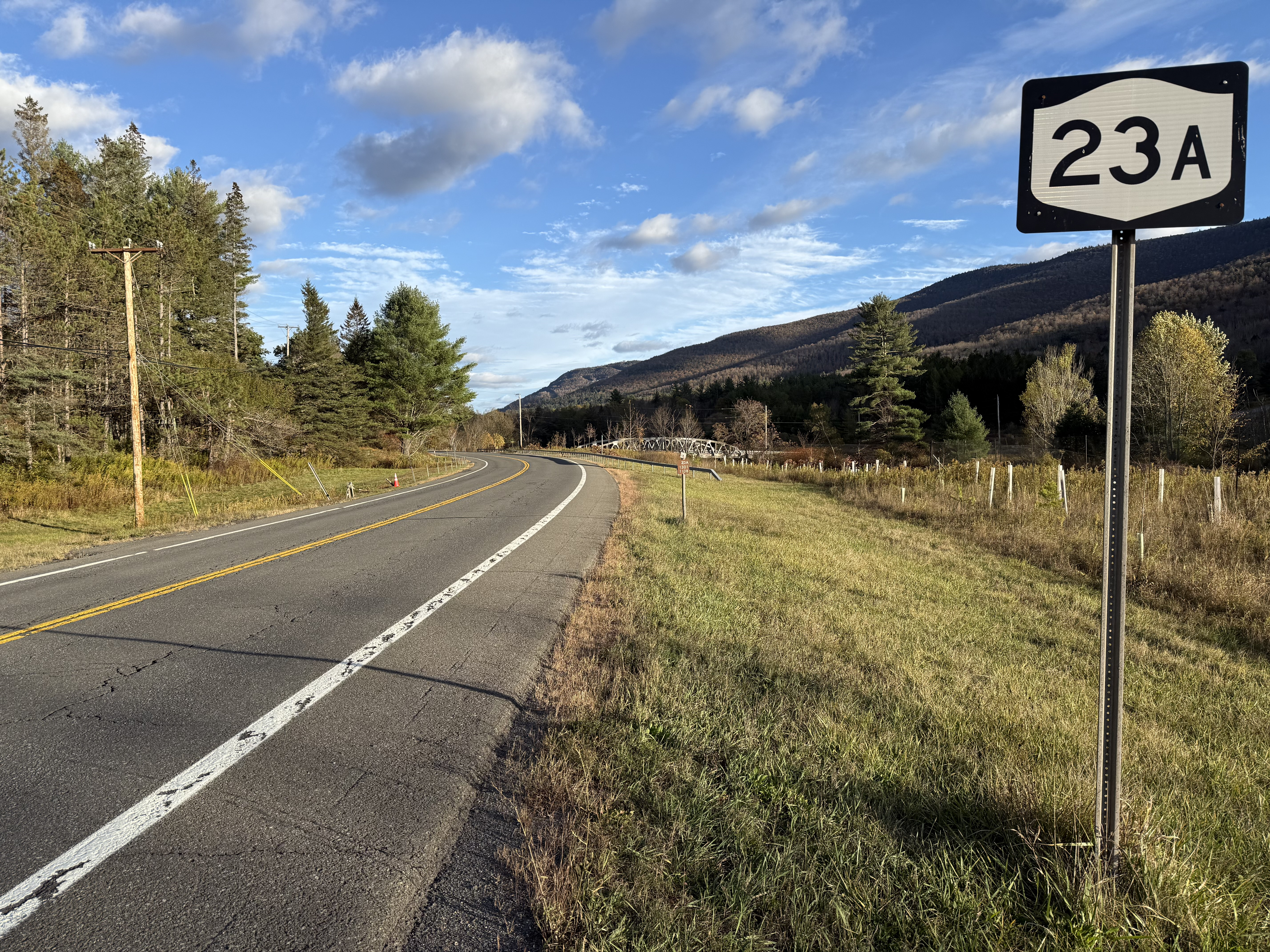
NY 23A eastbound in Jewett

== History ==
In 1913, the New York State Legislature created Route 5-c, an unsigned legislative route extending through Kaaterskill Clove from Palenville to Haines Falls. The route did not connect to any other route in the legislative route system, and was removed on March 1, 1921, as part of a partial renumbering of the system. When the first set of posted routes in New York were assigned in 1924, NY 23 was assigned to an alignment extending from Oneonta to the Massachusetts state line west of Great Barrington by way of Catskill Park. The new route bypassed Kaaterskill Clove to the north, however, in favor of an alignment serving the hamlets of Windham and Cairo. Within two years, the Kaaterskill Clove road was designated as part of NY 23A, an alternate route of NY 23 between Prattsville and Catskill through Hunter. The routing of NY 23A has remained the same since.

In 2006, the segment of NY 23A from Palenville to Haines Falls through Kaaterskill Clove was closed to traffic for several months by the New York State Department of Transportation (NYSDOT) due to landslides caused by heavy rains in downstate New York. The road, closed in mid-June, was repaired at a cost of roughly $5 million and reopened in late November in time for the Thanksgiving holiday period.

== Major intersections ==
The entire route is in Greene County.

Location	mi	km	Destinations	Notes
Prattsville	0.00	0.00	NY 23 – Grand Gorge, Stamford, Ashland	Western terminus
Lexington	6.37	10.25	NY 42 south – Lexington, Shandaken	Northern terminus of NY 42
Village of Hunter	14.05	22.61	NY 296 north – Windham	Southern terminus of NY 296
Town of Hunter	17.01	27.37	NY 214 south – Phoenicia	Northern terminus of NY 214
Town of Catskill	26.28	42.29	NY 32A south to I-87 / New York Thruway – Saugerties	Northern terminus of NY 32A; hamlet of Palenville
Town of Catskill	28.53	45.91	NY 32 – Cairo, Saugerties	
Village of Catskill	34.56	55.62	US 9W to I-87 / New York Thruway / NY 23 – Catskill, Saugerties	Eastern terminus
1.000 mi = 1.609 km; 1.000 km = 0.621 mi
