= Roundtop Mountain (Greene County, New York) =

Mountain in New York, United States

- Location within New York Location within the United States

Highest point
- Elevation: 3,451 ft (1,052 m)
- Coordinates: 42°10′06″N 74°05′40″W

Geography
- Location: S of Haines Falls, New York, U.S.
- Topo map: USGS Kaaterskill Clove

Roundtop Mountain is a mountain located in Greene County, New York south of Haines Falls, New York. Located to the east is High Peak and located to the northwest is Clum Hill. Roundtop Mountain drains north into Kaaterskill Creek and south into Schoharie Creek.
