= Kaaterskill Falls (disambiguation) =

Kaaterskill Falls may refer to:

- Kaaterskill Falls, a waterfall in the Catskill Mountains of New York
- Kaaterskill Falls (film)
- Kaaterskill Falls (novel), a 1998 novel by Allegra Goodman
- Kaaterskill Falls (painting), an 1832 painting by Thomas Cole
