= Rowena Memorial School =

- U.S. National Register of Historic Places
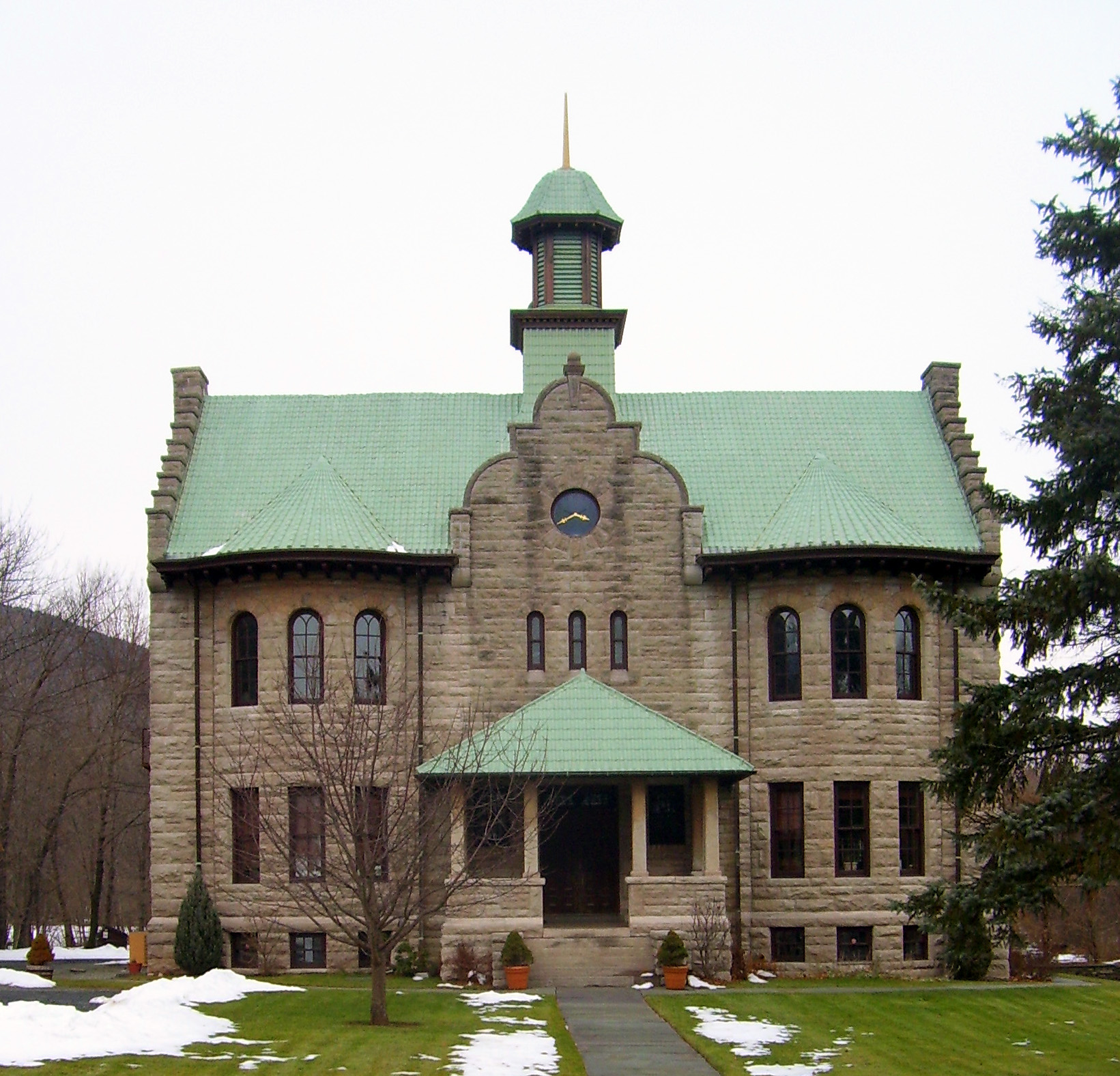
- School building in 2007
- Location: Palenville, NY
- Nearest city: Kingston
- Coordinates: 42°10′31″N 74°01′11″W
- Area: 1.6 acre (6,400 m²)
- Built: 1899-1901
- Architect: George Holdridge, John Davidson
- Architectural style: Romanesque
- NRHP reference No.: 02000879
- Added to NRHP: 2002

The former Rowena Memorial School is located on NY 23A, at the junction with NY 32A, in Palenville, New York, United States. It is a stone Romanesque style building that educated local students for 70 years. It had fallen into disrepair until it was rebuilt in the 1990s and converted to an arts center.

== Building ==
The school stands three stories high, with a panoramic view of the Catskill Escarpment to the northwest. Its entrance bay is topped with a Dutch gable with its original clock. A small, single-story three-by-two-bay wing projects from the north elevation.

Despite neglect and vandalism much of the interior remains intact. A bronze dedication plaque remains in the front hall, and in the classrooms and offices there is still much original woodwork. On the second story, an early partitioning system to allow the merging or division of classrooms as necessary, complete with blackboards on the paneling, is still in place. The only major change is the recital hall, where a collapsed ceiling was never replaced and instead the new room enjoys a higher, cathedral-style ceiling.

== History ==
It was built by Lysander Lawrence, a wealthy New York City merchant. He, among many others, passed through Palenville during his summers in the late 19th century on his way to the Catskill Mountain House. During those trips, he became acquainted with one of the local school principals. After the death of his wife Rowena in the 1890s, Lawrence decided to pay tribute to her by doing something for the community they had both come to love. He decided to pay for a new school building that would combine the populations currently attending Palenville's two small schoolhouses.

He hired Newburgh architect John A. Davidson to draw up plans, and local mason George Holdridge began cutting stone from the nearby Empire Quarry. Construction began in 1899; the first classes were held in 1901. The community was at first ecstatic about its new edifice. "How fitting it is", said Catskill High School Principal Charles Hale, "that a village nestled at the foot of the grand old mountains should have a school that speaks so eloquently of the skill of man — a building perfect as a work of art." On September 3, 1900, a dedication ceremony featuring a children's choir and fireworks display was attended by the state's deputy superintendent of public instruction.

As the reality of the new school set in, some residents began to express concern about its maintenance costs. Lawrence had paid the $50,000 construction cost himself, but the community would have to pay the annual upkeep for the new school, which could accommodate five times as many students as the district then had, and some residents did not think it could afford to do so. There was also opposition to the choice of C.F. Payne, Lawrence's friend, as principal of the new school. After a series of political maneuvers that involved the state schools superintendent and led to the removal of one member of the school board, Payne kept his job. The building remained a source of contention, and some residents called for its demolition so that everyone could be friends again.

It continued as Palenville's school until 1977, when the Catskill Central School District was created from the merger of the small rural districts in the area. The new district closed the building down. It continued in use as a library until it was closed again in 1989. For several years it deteriorated until jewelry designer Steven Kretchmer and his wife purchased it and remodeled it into Ringing Metal Studios. Since his death in a motorcycle accident in 2006, Steven's step-daughter moved in, took over the business and building maintenance. The house was occupied full-time until 2009. It is now being occupied part-time and maintained regularly until someone purchases it. .
