= Twilight Park Historic District =

Historic district in New York, United States

- U.S. National Register of Historic Places
- U.S. Historic district
- Location within New York Location within the United States
- Location: Ledge End. Rd., Spray Falls Rd., Upper Level Rd. and vic., Haines Falls, New York
- Coordinates: 42°11′21.01″N 74°5′15″W
- Area: 588 acres (238 ha)
- Architect: Frances, Henry and Ed; et al.
- Architectural style: Late Victorian, Late 19th And 20th Century Revivals
- NRHP reference No.: 07000626
- Added to NRHP: June 27, 2007

Twilight Park Historic District is a national historic district located at Haines Falls in Greene County, New York. The district contains 102 contributing buildings, one contributing site, and seven contributing structures. It is composed of two late 19th century resort communities that have been incorporated as one (and under one name) since 1935. Twilight Park is the larger of the two, while Santa Cruz Park includes 15 remaining cottages. The initial cottages were constructed in 1887.

On 14 July 1926, fourteen people were killed in hotel fire in Twilight.

It was listed on the National Register of Historic Places in 2007.
