= Clum Hill =

Mountain in New York State, USA

- Location within New York Adirondack Park Location within the United States

Highest point
- Elevation: 2,385 feet (727 m)
- Coordinates: 42°11′02″N 74°07′54″W

Geography
- Location: S of Tannersville, New York, U.S.
- Topo map: USGS Hunter

Clum Hill is a mountain in Greene County, New York. It is located in the Catskill Mountains south of Tannersville. Parker Mountain is located north-northwest, and Roundtop Mountain is located southeast of Clum Hill.
