= Kaaterskill Creek =

Location
- Country: United States
- State: New York
- County: Greene

Physical characteristics
- Source: Kaaterskill Wild Forest, Catskill Park
  - location: Kaaterskill Wild Forest, Haines Falls, New York
  - coordinates: 42°13′18″N 74°05′13″W
- Mouth: Catskill Creek
  - location: Cauterskill, New York
  - coordinates: 42°13′18″N 73°53′15″W

Kaaterskill Creek is a 25.9-mile-long (41.7 km) tributary of Catskill Creek in Greene and Ulster counties in New York. Via Catskill Creek, it is part of the Hudson River watershed.

Kaaterskill Creek rises in the town of Hunter within the Catskill Forest Preserve, northwest of the village of Tannersville. It flows south to the hamlet of Haines Falls, where it turns east and drops precipitously into Kaaterskill Clove, paralleled by New York Route 23A and receiving Spruce Creek from the north, which drops over Kaaterskill Falls. Kaaterskill Creek exits the mountains at the hamlet of Palenville and takes a zigzag course, crossing back and forth between Greene and Ulster counties, before finally turning northeast and flowing to its mouth at Catskill Creek near Cauterskill, New York, just west of the village of Catskill.

== See also ==
- List of rivers of New York
