= Kaaterskill Clove =

Valley in New York State, USA

Coordinates: 42.177°N 74.053°W

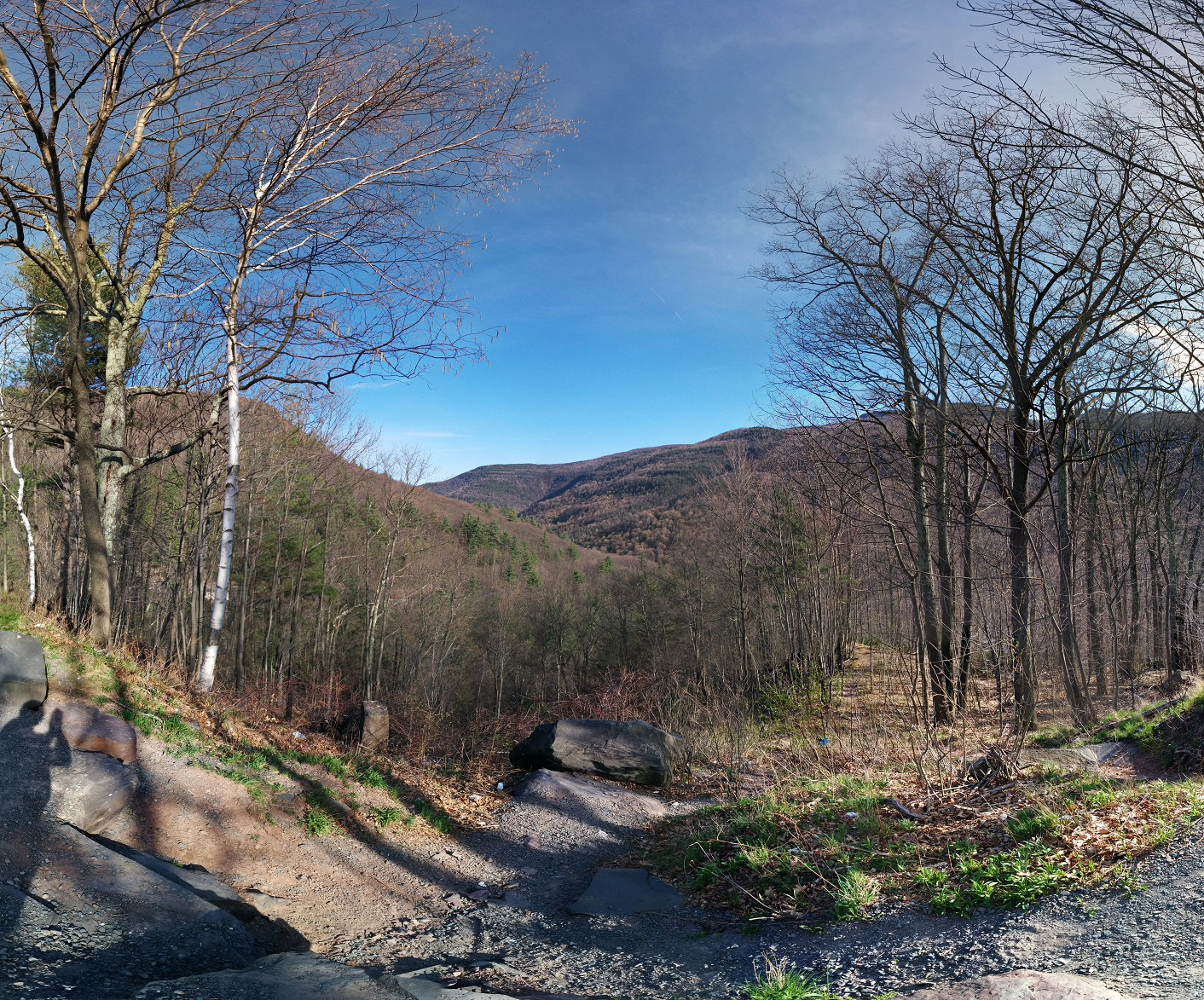
Kaaterskill Clove

Kaaterskill Clove is a deep gorge, or valley, in New York's eastern Catskill Mountains, lying just west of the village of Palenville and in Haines Falls. The clove was formed by Kaaterskill Creek, a tributary of Catskill Creek rising west of North Mountain, and is estimated by geologists to be as much as 1 million years old. Kaaterskill High Peak and Roundtop Mountain rise to the south of the gorge, while South Mountain is to its north. This makes the gorge as deep as 2,500 feet in places.

== History ==
Little is known of Kaaterskill Clove's history prior to 1817, when Gilbert Palen built a tannery near the entrance to Kaaterskill Clove, giving the village of Palenville its name. After the War of 1812, with Americans free to pursue trade without fearing the interference of Great Britain, industry throughout the United States began to expand, with Palenville and Kaaterskill Clove becoming the site of many tanneries due to the large hemlock forests in the clove. Within just half a century, however, deforestation had set in, and the tannery industry collapsed, lacking the trees it required. Palenville reinvented itself as a tourist town, building several boardinghouses and proclaiming itself the home of the fictional character Rip van Winkle.

The clove was popular with artists and walkers, fleeing the squalor and hubbub of the downstate cities. In particular, artists of the Hudson River School painted the Clove: examples include Asher Brown Durand's 1849 painting Kindred Spirits, depicting fellow artist Thomas Cole, Jennie Augusta Brownscombe, one of the founders of the Arts Student's League had a studio there with Hart and poet William Cullen Bryant, and Sanford Gifford's 1862 work Kaaterskill Clove in the Catskills.

Twentieth Century artists such as landscapist Thomas Locker (1937–2012) described the Clove as a vacation spot he returned to many times since his childhood, and many of his paintings depict the Clove and life in it according to a video he filmed for his agent, Richard Michelson of R.Michelson Gallery in Northampton, MA.

Numerous mountain houses and hotels were constructed, including the Laurel House, the Catskill Mountain House, the Haines Falls House and others, and trails and walkways were constructed to the many overlooks and waterfalls in the clove. Most notable was the construction of the Rip Van Winkle Trail, now Route 23A, which wound its way up the clove from Palenville to the hamlet of Haines Falls. This opened the interior of the clove to visitors from the cities for the first time, and is still a main route into the heart of the northern Catskills (especially in winter when Route 35, which ascends through Platte Clove, is closed).

== Attractions ==
Perhaps the most famous location in Kaaterskill Clove is Kaaterskill Falls, a 231-foot waterfall on Lake Creek (a medium-sized tributary of Kaaterskill Creek) commonly thought to be the highest waterfall in New York State. However, there are several other waterfalls in the clove including Fawn's Leap, Buttermilk Falls, and Haines Falls, although the trails that once led to these falls have long since been reclaimed by the gorge, making access difficult.

Numerous hiking trails also exist in and above Kaaterskill Clove. The Long Path passes through the clove, skirting its southern rim. Trails on the northern rim visit Inspiration Point, Sunset Rock, Artist Rock and other locations providing views down into the clove and across towards Kaaterskill High Peak. There is also a campground near North-South Lakes, and access to the site of the former Catskill Mountain House, with views across the Hudson Valley from the top of the Catskill Escarpment.

== Gallery ==
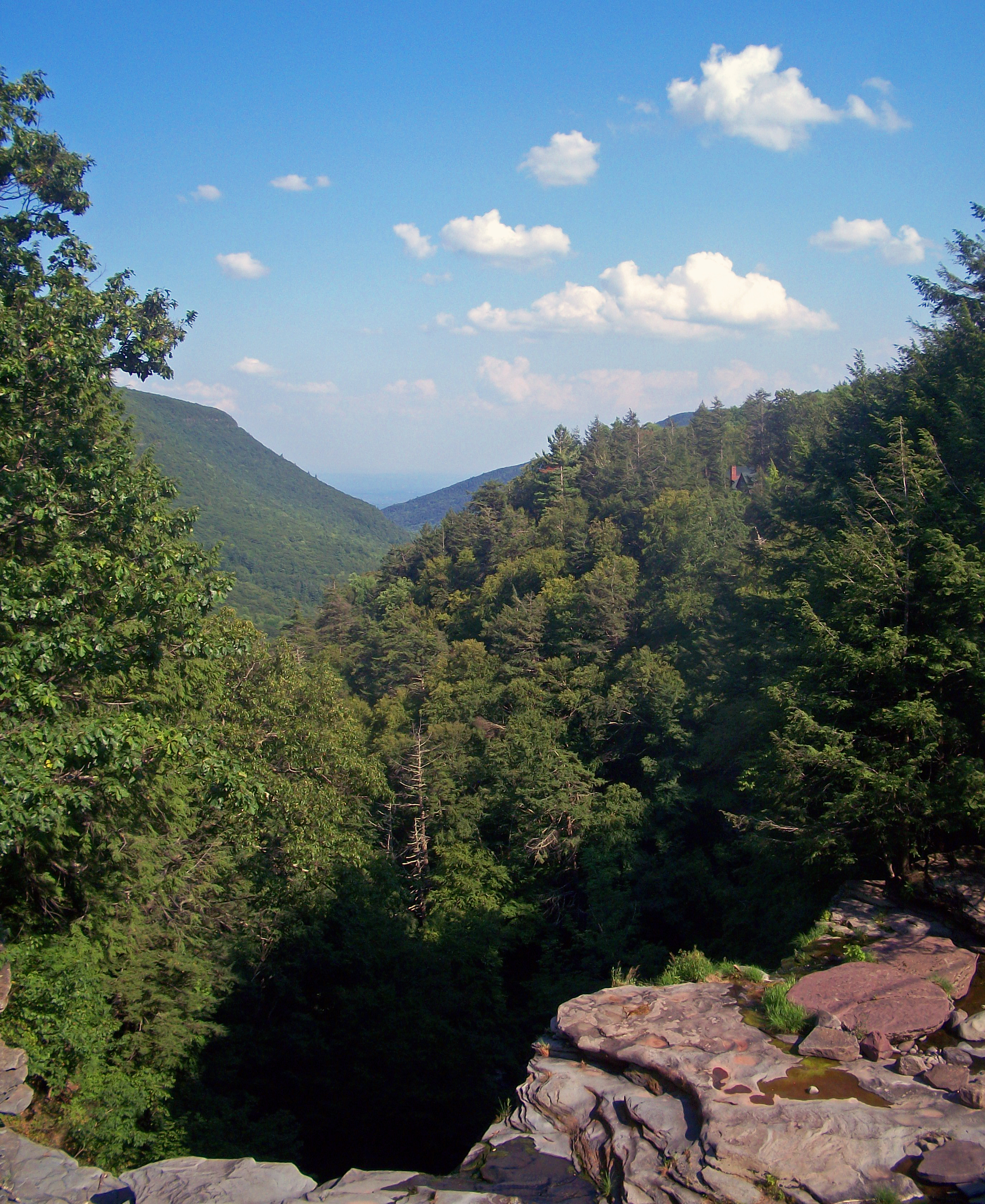
Kaaterskill Clove from Twilight Park

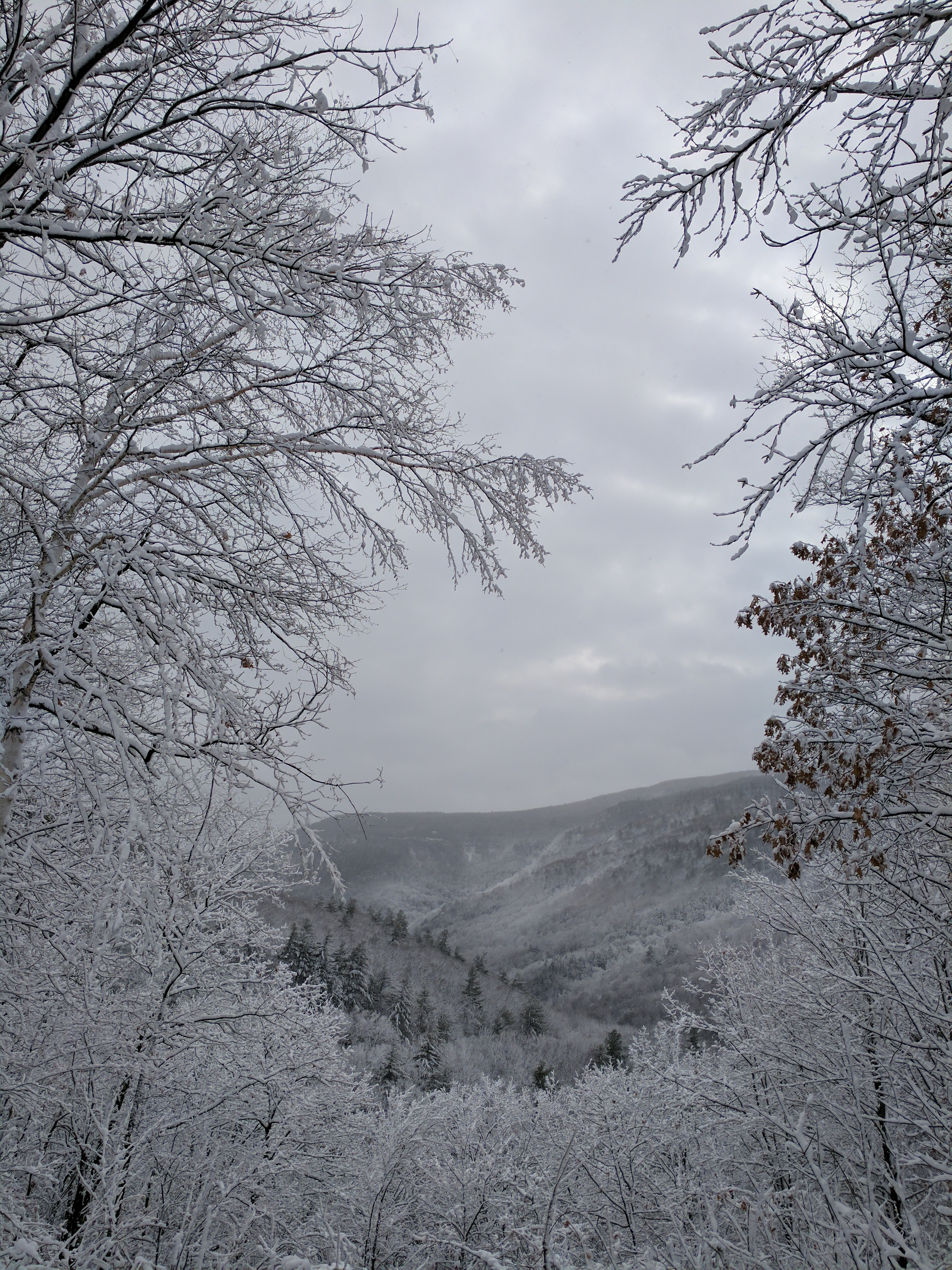
Kaaterskill Clove in Winter

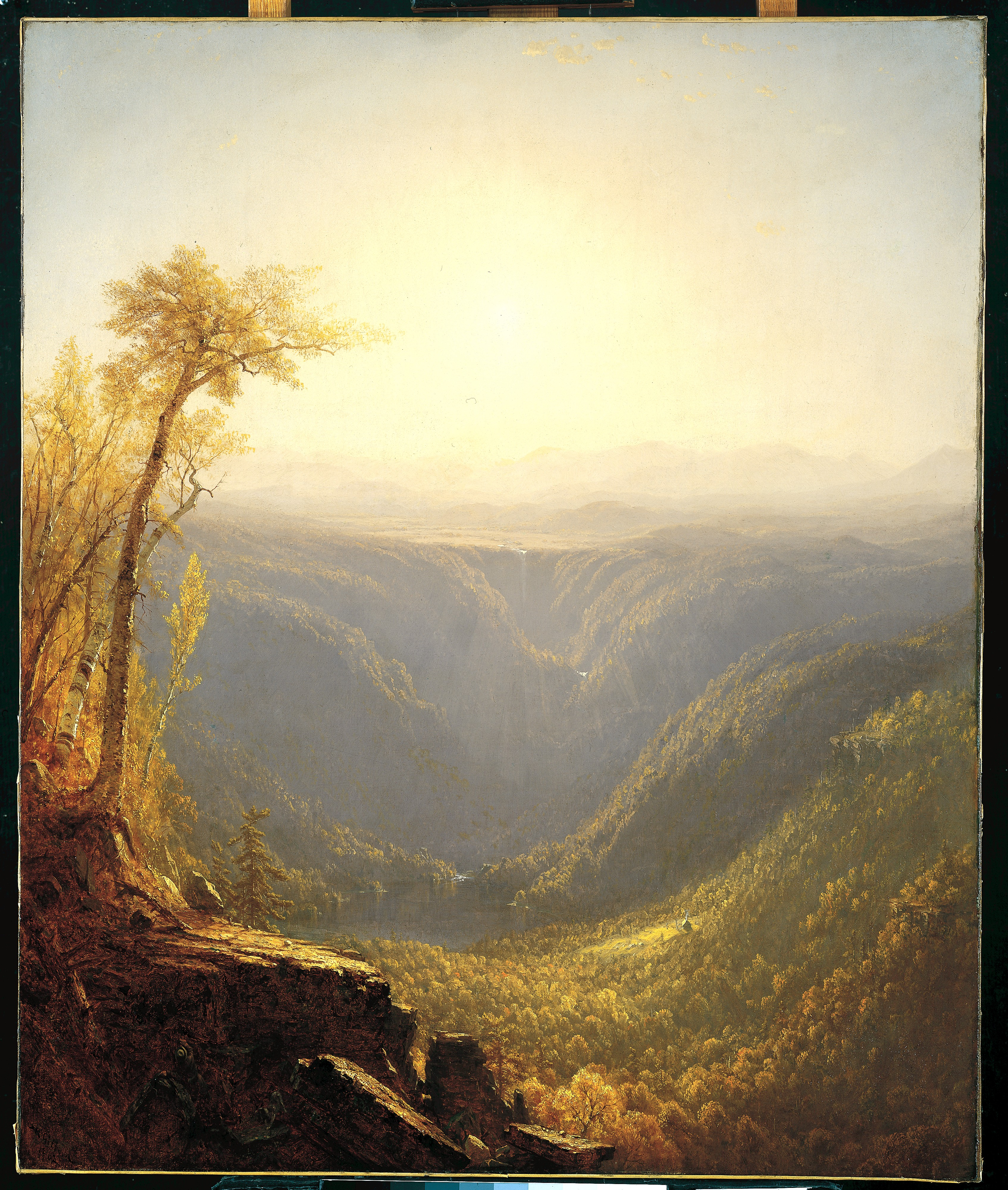
Painting by Sanford Robinson Gifford

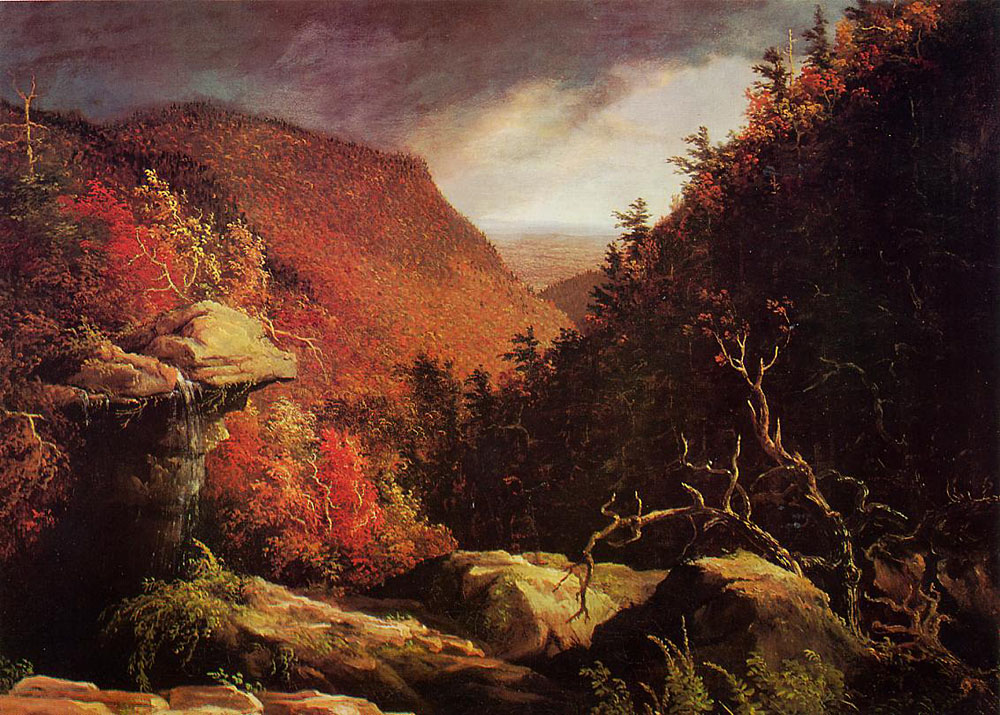
Painting by Thomas Cole

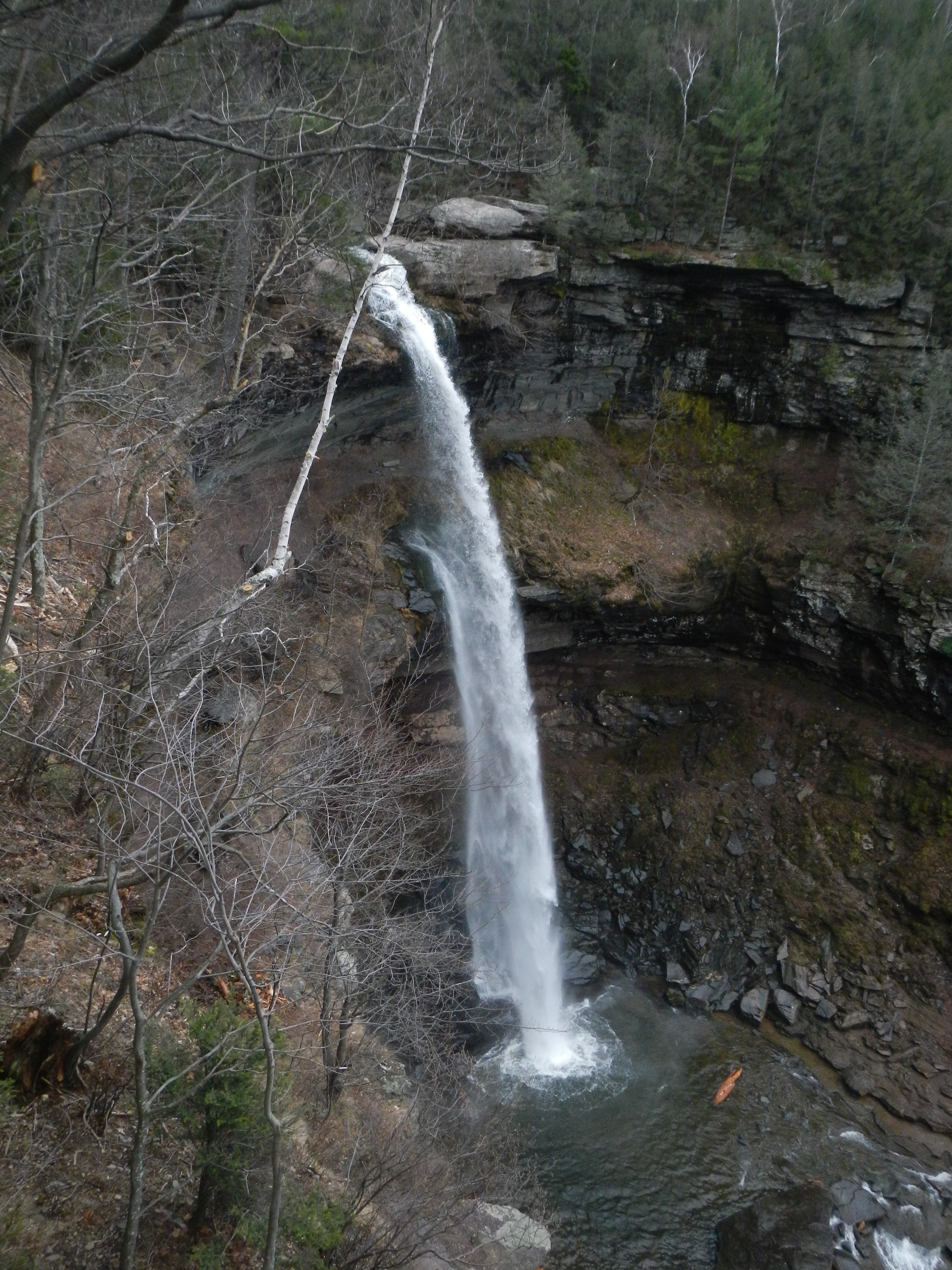
Kaaterskill Falls
