= Palenville, New York =

Hamlet and census-designated place in New York, US

- Census-designated place
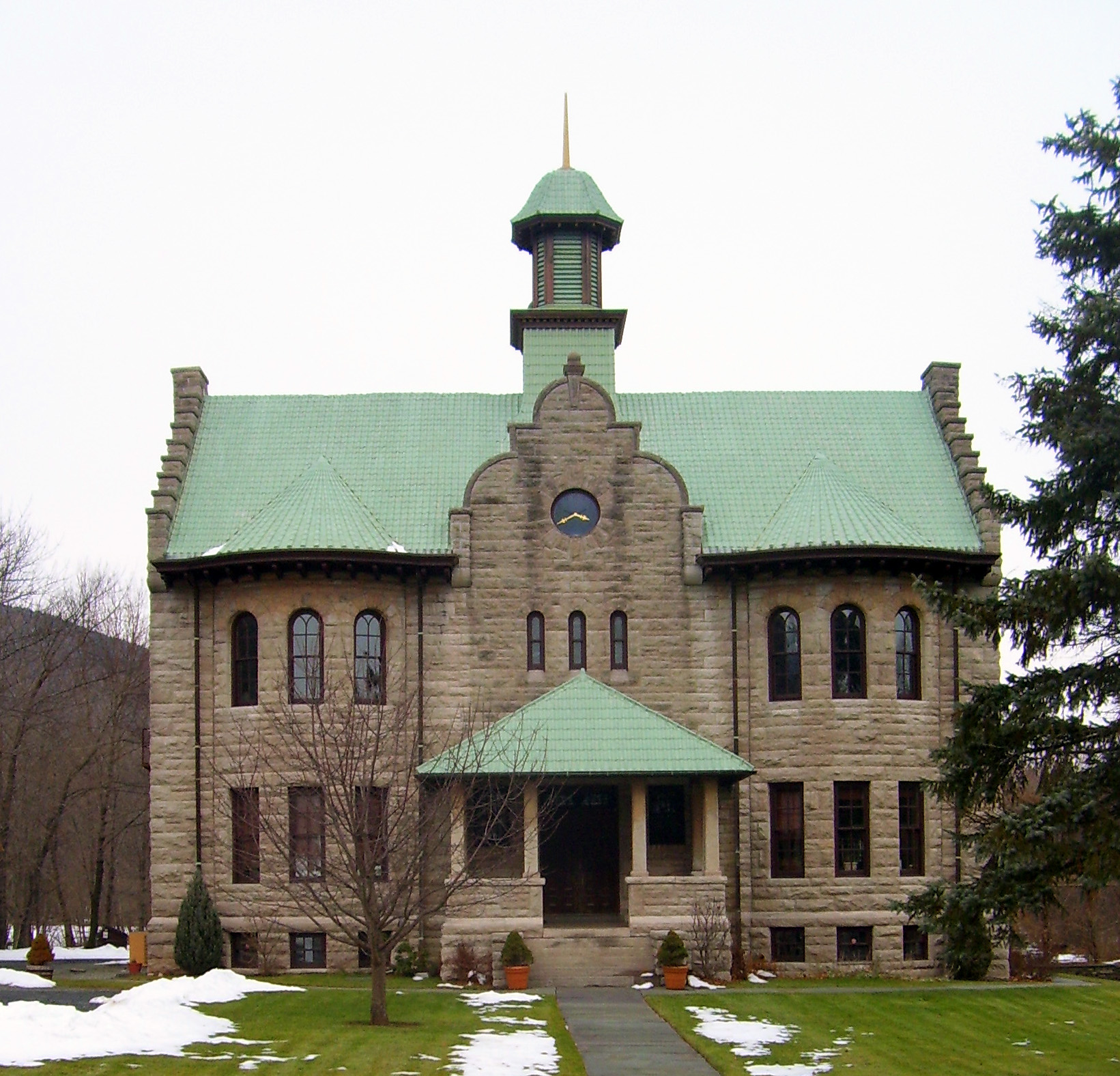
- Rowena Memorial School
- Nickname: "Village of Falling Waters"
- Location within New York Location within the United States
- Coordinates: 42°10′11″N 74°1′9″W
- Country: United States
- State: New York
- County: Greene
- Town: Catskill

Area
  - Total: 3.39 sq mi (8.79 km^{2})
  - Land: 3.38 sq mi (8.76 km^{2})
  - Water: 0.0077 sq mi (0.02 km^{2})
- Elevation: 568 ft (173 m)

Population (2020)
  - Total: 1,002
  - Density: 296.2/sq mi (114.35/km^{2})
- Time zone: UTC-5 (Eastern (EST))
  - Summer (DST): UTC-4 (EDT)
- ZIP code: 12463
- Area code: 518
- FIPS code: 36-56132
- GNIS feature ID: 0959772

Palenville is a hamlet and census-designated place (CDP) in Greene County, New York, United States. The population was 1,002 at the 2020 census.

Palenville is in the southwestern part of the town of Catskill, located at the junction of Routes 23A and 32A. It lies at the foot of Kaaterskill Clove, at the base of the Catskill Mountains. Kaaterskill Creek, exiting the Clove, runs through the town, and was spanned by a swinging footbridge, destroyed during Tropical Storm Irene. The creek provides a number of swimming holes in the summer months, and the Long Path runs through the town.

== History ==
Palenville takes its name from the Palen family, who built and operated tanneries throughout the Catskills starting in the 1820s. The tannery era was short. When the local supply of hemlock bark was exhausted, the tannery closed, leaving Palenville to reinvent itself.

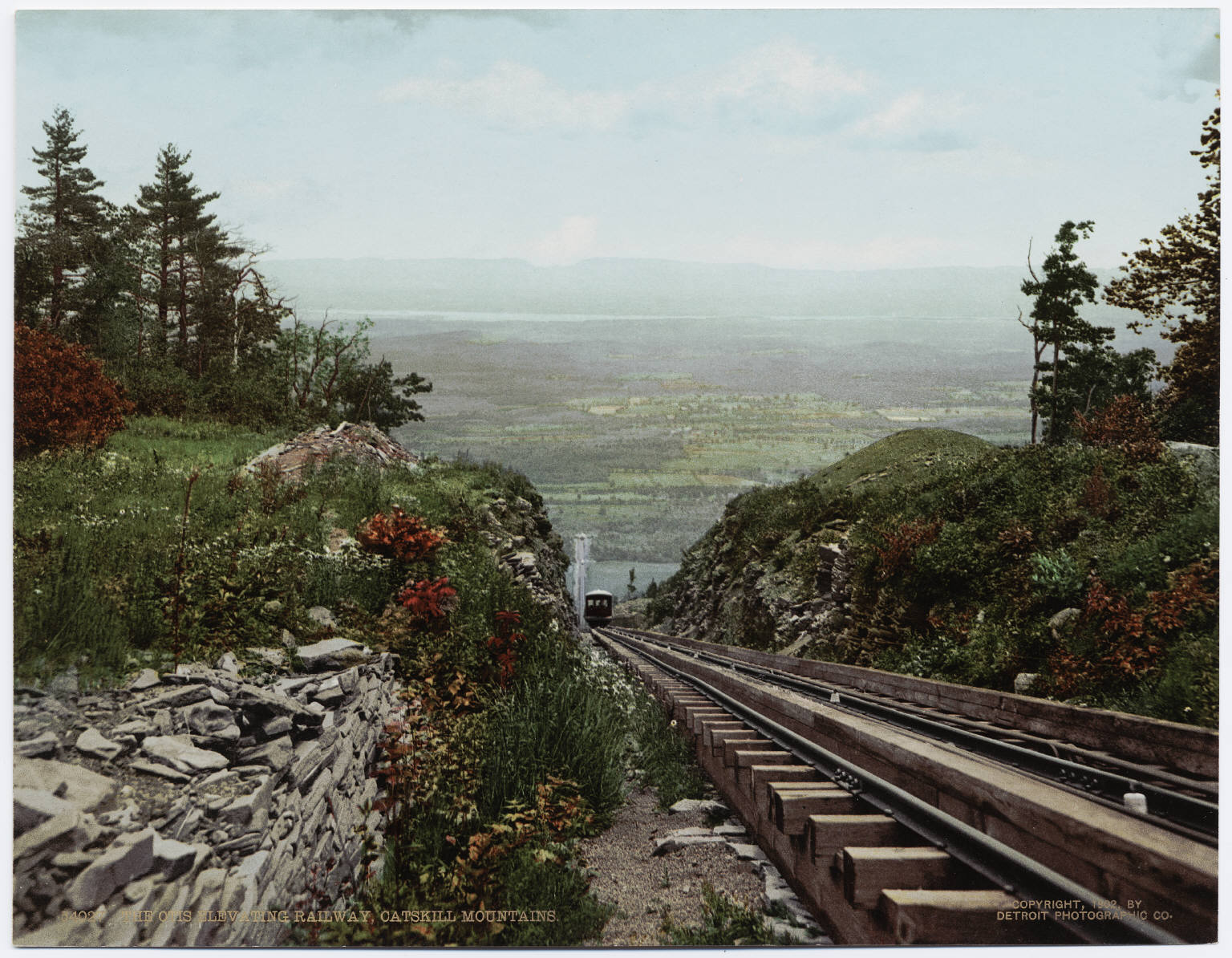
Otis Elevating Railway in Palenville, ca. 1900

With many waterfalls and natural vistas nearby, Palenville was an important center of the Hudson River School of painting during the 19th century. Thomas Cole, Frederic Church, and other notable painters stayed and worked in Palenville during the height of the movement. The famous painting Kindred Spirits depicts Cole and William Cullen Bryant near Kaaterskill Falls, just uphill from the town. The famous Catskill Mountain House was also located just outside Palenville. Palenville was the fictional home of Rip Van Winkle (the subject of a short story by Washington Irving).

Palenville historically was described as the "First Art Colony in America" Dr. Roland Van Zandt, in The Catskill Mountain House.

With the coming of the twentieth century, the large boarding houses of the mountain top started to close, but Palenville and the surroundings were often visited by city dwellers. Palenville was one of the Catskills' vacation resorts, hosting nearly two dozen small and medium-sized boarding houses and many hotels at the turn of the century. Palenville, Kaaterskill Creek, and Kaaterskill Clove have been subjects for several painters, including those listed above.

Late in the 20th century an art gallery opened on Palenville's Main Street, and the Pine Orchard Summer Festival was founded. Opening in 1980 and hosting its first national juried show in 1981, the privately owned and funded Terrance Gallery exhibited more than 1,200 American artists, in a call to revisit the historic gathering place of the 19th-century painters. The Pine Orchard, located on 60 acres (240,000 m^{2}) along the Manorville Road, through fundraising and grants refurbished a chapel into a theater and hosted opera, plays, musicians, writers and artists. Shakespeare and the Circus arts were presented there by the Bond Street Theater group.

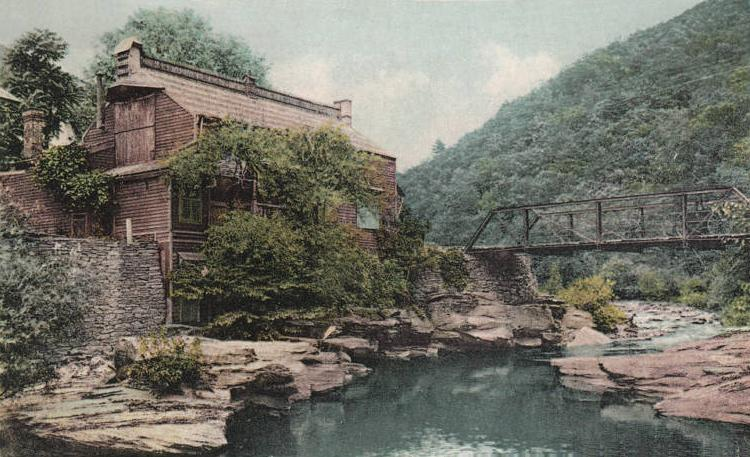
Old studio of Artist Hall in 1906

Mary Pickford made several movies in Palenville. Robert Goss of the group "Dripping Goss" (American Gothic Records) had a single that sold well in Europe in the 1990s, some of which were recorded at the Turning Mill Studio in Palenville.

The Terrance Gallery and the Pine Orchard festivals have closed, but the Palenville Library and the Woodbine Inn are still open.

Palenville was featured on the Endless Thread podcast.

Other noted artists who frequented Palenville and the Clove included Winslow Homer, Asher B. Durand, Thomas Addison Richards, John Frederick Kensett and Sanford R. Gifford. Landscape painters of the 20th century included Albert Handel, Barry Hopkins, Athena Billias, Michelle Moran and Patti Ferrara. George H. Hall, who was a genre painter, took up residence in Palenville towards the end of the 19th century; and Terrance J. DePietro, an abstract painter, who was early on influenced by the Hudson River School, maintained residence and a studio from the latter part of the 20th century into the 21st. He brought artists from Quebec, Canada, including Nicole Lemelin and Remi LaRoche.

== Demographics ==
Historical population
Census	Pop.	Note	%±
2000	1,120		—
2010	1,037		−7.4%
2020	1,002		−3.4%
U.S. Decennial Census

As of the census of 2000, there were 1,120 people, 433 households, and 287 families residing in the CDP. The population density was 337.2 inhabitants per square mile (130.2/km^{2}). There were 551 housing units at an average density of 165.9 per square mile (64.1/km^{2}). The racial makeup of the CDP was 96.16% White, 0.45% African American, 0.27% Native American, 1.07% Asian, 0.27% from other races, and 1.79% from two or more races. Hispanic or Latino of any race were 2.23% of the population.

There were 433 households, out of which 30.5% had children under the age of 18 living with them, 52.0% were married couples living together, 10.9% had a female householder with no husband present, and 33.5% were non-families. 25.9% of all households were made up of individuals, and 8.3% had someone living alone who was 65 years of age or older. The average household size was 2.45 and the average family size was 2.94.

In the CDP, the population was spread out, with 25.5% under the age of 18, 6.1% from 18 to 24, 32.0% from 25 to 44, 24.5% from 45 to 64, and 12.0% who were 65 years of age or older. The median age was 38 years. For every 100 females, there were 97.2 males. For every 100 females age 18 and over, there were 96.7 males.

The median income for a household in the CDP was $40,833, and the median income for a family was $51,250. Males had a median income of $32,353 versus $23,542 for females. The per capita income for the CDP was $18,848. 7.4% of the population were living below the poverty line, none of which were under eighteens, over 64, or families.

== Notable people ==
- Hannah Arendt, political theorist (summer residence)
- A. A. Bondy, musician and singer/songwriter
- Carrot Top, comedian
- The Felice Brothers, folk rock/country rock band
- Rufus Palen, congressman
- Rip Van Winkle, fictional resident

== See also ==
- North–South Lake campground
