= Kindred Spirits (painting) =

1849 painting by Asher Brown Durand

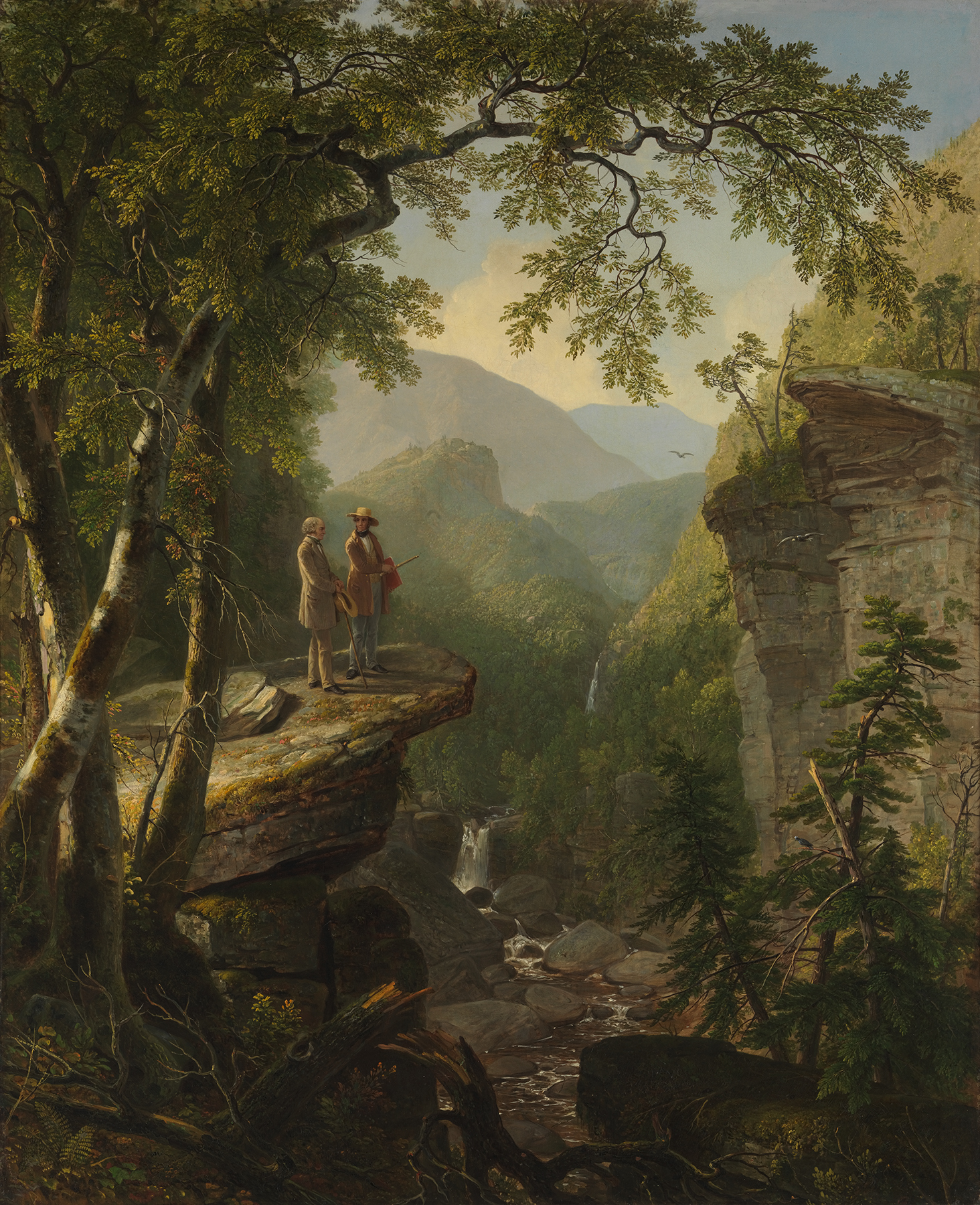
Kindred Spirits (1849). Oil on canvas. 116.8 x 91.4 cm. Crystal Bridges Museum of American Art

Kindred Spirits (1849) is a painting by Asher Brown Durand, a member of the Hudson River School of painters. It depicts the painter Thomas Cole, who had died in 1848, and his friend, the poet William Cullen Bryant, in the Catskill Mountains. The landscape painting, which combines geographical features in Kaaterskill Clove and a minuscule depiction of Kaaterskill Falls, is not a literal depiction of American geography. Rather, it is an idealized memory of Cole's discovery of the region more than twenty years prior, his friendship with Bryant, and his ideas about American nature.

Kindred Spirit is exhibited in the Crystal Bridges Museum of American Art in Bentonville, Arkansas.

== History ==
The painting was commissioned by New York art collector and advocate Jonathan Sturges as a gift to Bryant who in May 1848 had presented a eulogy for the painter Cole (who had unexpectedly died in February of that year). Sturges explained the gift by writing:

Soon after you [Bryant] delivered your oration in the life and death of our lamented friend Cole,
I requested Mr. Durand to paint a picture in which he should associate our departed friend and
yourself as kindred spirits. ... I hope that you will accept the picture from me as a token of
gratitude for the labor of love performed on that occasion.

— Letter from Sturges to Bryant

Within days of receiving the painting, Bryant wrote thank you notes to both Sturges and Durand expressing his praise for the work. Bryant described his first impression of the gift to Durand, writing, "I was more delighted with it than I can express, and am under very great obligations to you for having put so much of your acknowledged genius into a work intended for me." He continued on to state that "the painting seems to me in your best manner, which is the highest praise." According to Bryant, visitors to his home admired the painting too. "Every body admires it greatly," he wrote, "and places it high as a work of art." A few weeks after the painting was delivered to Bryant, it was exhibited at the National Academy of Design. While there it received high praise in the press and periodicals. By then it was known as, Kindred Spirits, a title inspired by John Keats' "Sonnet to Solitude."

Yet the sweet converse of an innocent mind,

Whose words are images of thought refin’d,

Is my soul's pleasure; and it sure must be

Almost the highest bliss of human-kind,

When to thy haunts two kindred spirits flee.

In 1904, Bryant's daughter Julia donated the painting to the New York Public Library. In 2005, it was sold at auction to Walmart heiress Alice Walton for $35 million, a record for a painting by an American artist. The Library was criticized for "jettisoning part of the city's cultural patrimony," but the Library defended its move stating it needed the money for its endowment fund. The painting was on display at the National Gallery of Art between 2005 and 2007. Currently, the painting is held in the Crystal Bridges Museum of American Art in Bentonville, Arkansas.

== Composition ==
At its heart, Kindred Spirits is a memory piece. Durand, a friend of both Cole and Bryant, depicted his friends in their companionate stance in a location they both expressed in their creative pieces. Cole would depict the area beginning in 1826 with his painting Kaaterskill Falls and the area soon became an icon of the burgeoning American landscape painting. Bryant, poet and newspaper editor, would poetically capture the Kaaterskill in his poem "Caaterskill Falls."

Combining two locations—Kaaterskill Falls and the Clove—in an idealized format, the painting illustrates the idea of communing with Nature. As kindred spirits, Cole and Bryant both shared a passion for the American landscape. In the summer of 1840, Bryant explored the Kaaterskill area of the Catskills with Cole. Standing on the ledge looking out towards the valley, the paintings’ figures of Bryant and Cole illustrate Cole's 1836 description:

“…in gazing on the pure creations of the Almighty, he feels a calm religious tone steal through
his mind, and when he has turned to mingle with his fellow men, the chords which have been
struck in the sweet communion cease not to vibrate.”

— Essay on American Scenery

Durand included the names of these kindred spirits within the landscape itself by carving in paint their names into the birch tree on the left side of the painting.

By painting Cole and Bryant together in Kindred Spirits, Durand created a visual record of the relationship between the art and literary circles of the early nineteenth century, as well as their common beliefs toward the American landscape and Nature. Today, Kindred Spirits has come to symbolize both the Hudson River School and its era's culture. Conceived as a memory piece for Cole, Kindred Spirits may now be said to be a visual memory of the era in which it was created.

The painting is part of the permanent collection at Crystal Bridges Museum of American Art in Bentonville, Arkansas.

== In popular culture ==
In his 1998 book A Walk in the Woods: Rediscovering America on the Appalachian Trail, Bill Bryson describes his love for the painting and how he would love to jump into the scene depicted.

Marianne Moore references the painting in her poem "The Camperdown Elm".

The painting was included in the game Civilization V. Players have a chance to view it upon completing a Great Artist.

The painting is mentioned in Brad Watson's short story "Kindred Spirits" in his collection, The Last of the Dog-Men.

The painting is depicted in Sean Price Williams's movie The Sweet East using the Schüfftan process.
