= Kaaterskill Falls (painting) =

Painting by Thomas Cole

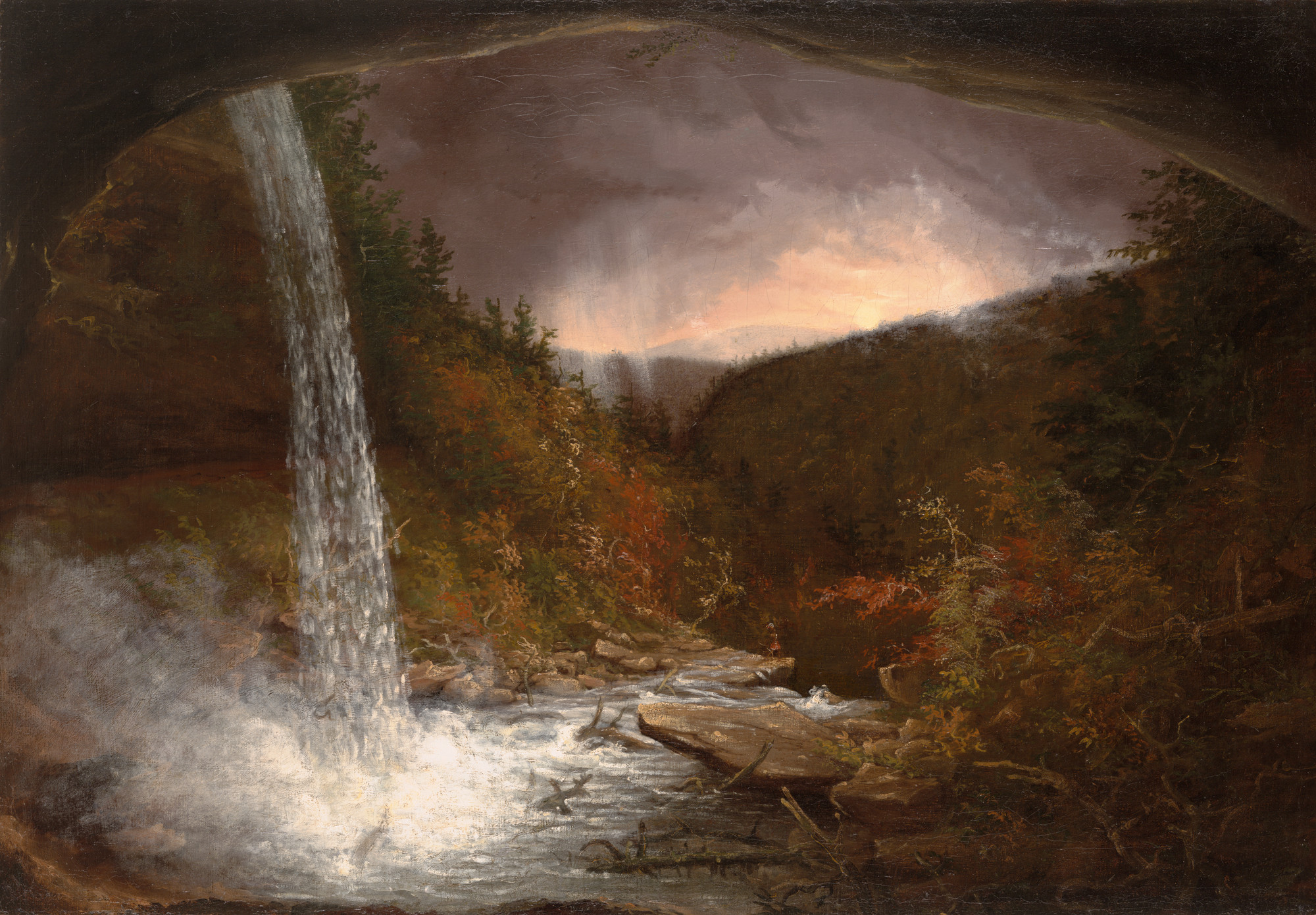
- Kaaterskill Falls, 1826
- Artist: Thomas Cole
- Year: 1826
- Medium: Oil on Canvas
- Dimensions: 64.2 cm × 89.7 cm (25.25 in × 35.31 in)
- Location: Wadsworth Atheneum; Hartford, Connecticut

Kaaterskill Falls is an 1826 oil-on-canvas painting by British-American painter Thomas Cole, founder of the Hudson River School. It depicts the Kaaterskill Falls in Upstate New York.

== Artist's background ==
Tom Christopher wrote that “[Thomas] Cole’s greatest artistic asset proved to be his untutored eye.” Cole emigrated to America with his family in the spring of 1819 at the age of eighteen. As a child, his surroundings were of Lancashire, England, an area known to be an epicenter of Britain’s primarily industrial region. Because of this, Cole was granted an additional clarity of and sensitivity to the vibrancy of American landscapes awash with color, a stark contrast to the bleak and subdued landscapes of the country he left behind.

== History ==
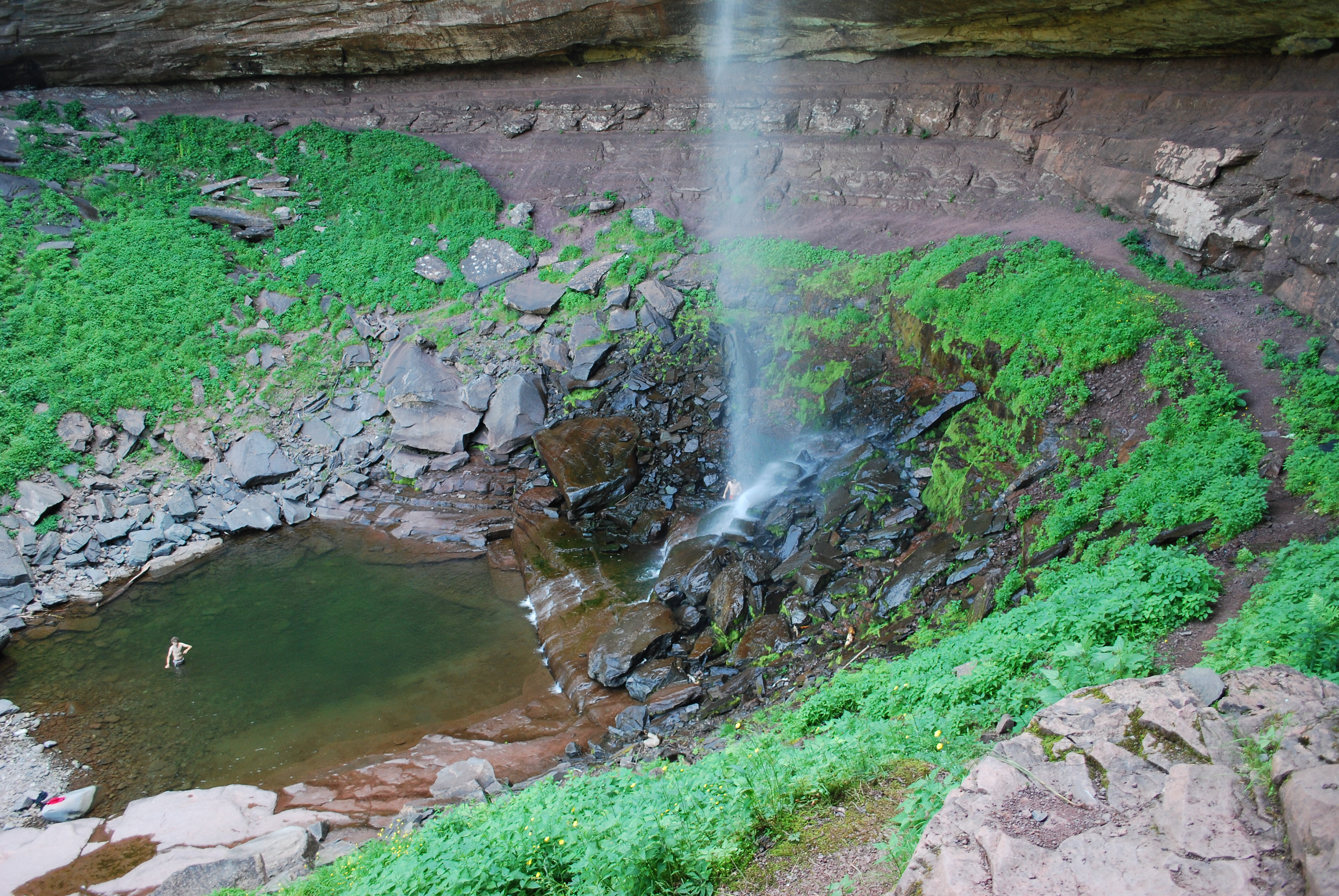
The actual Kaaterskill Falls in upstate New York

The painting was commissioned by Daniel Wadsworth in 1826. He bequeathed it to the Wadsworth Atheneum in 1848; it remains in its possession.

== See also ==
- List of paintings by Thomas Cole
