= Kaaterskill Falls =

Waterfall in New York, United States

Coordinates: 42.193234°N 74.063044°W

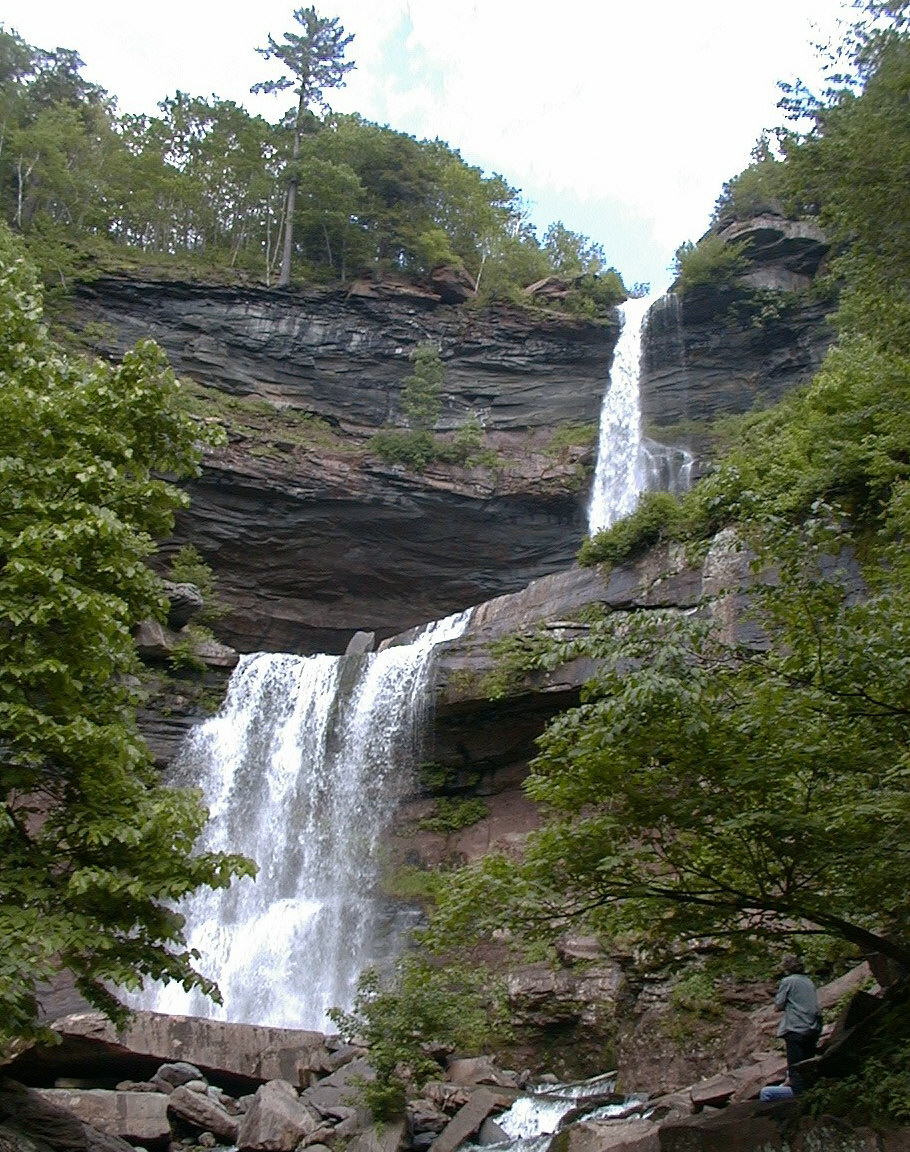
- Kaaterskill Falls from below
- Interactive map of Kaaterskill Falls
- Location: Catskill Mountains, Hunter, New York, United States
- Type: Tiered
- Total height: 260 ft (79 m)
- Number of drops: 2
- Longest drop: 180 ft (55 m)
- Watercourse: Spruce Creek
- Average flow rate
- World height ranking

Kaaterskill Falls is a two-stage waterfall on Spruce Creek in the eastern Catskill Mountains of New York, between the hamlets of Haines Falls and Palenville in Greene County. The two cascades total 260 feet (79 m) in height, making Kaaterskill Falls one of the highest waterfalls in New York, and one of the Eastern United States' tallest waterfalls.

The waterfalls are one of America's oldest tourist attractions, being depicted or described by many books, essays, poems and paintings of the early 19th century. Beginning with Thomas Cole's first visit during 1825, they became a subject for painters of the Hudson River School, setting the wilderness ideal for American landscape painting. The Falls also inspired "Catterskill Falls", a poem by William Cullen Bryant.

== History ==
=== Geological formation ===
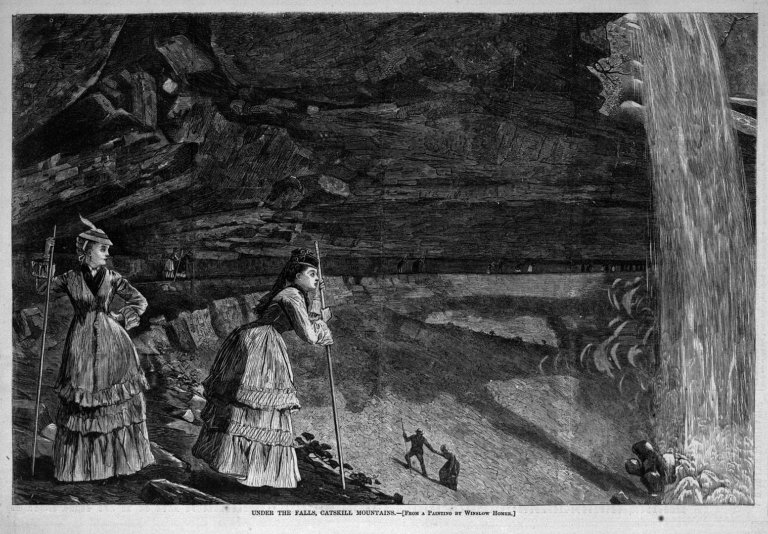
Winslow Homer - Under the Falls, Catskill Mountains - Brooklyn Museum

The falls, like the clove and creek with which they share a name, are a relatively recent addition to the Catskills in terms of geologic time. They evolved through stream capture at the end of the Illinoian Stage, when runoff from the glacial melt that created North-South Lake began to flow away from the nearby headwaters of Schoharie Creek and down the steep slopes of the newly created clove. The rushing waters of what would become known as Spruce Creek eroded a natural amphitheater at roughly 2,000 feet (609 m) on the south slope of South Mountain.

Most of the drop is accounted for by the upper cascade. The shelf dividing the two falls (and creating the large pool between them) is the break between the Manorkill Sandstone formed in the Middle Devonian period and the Oneonta-Genesee sandstone-shale mixture of the late Devonian period.

=== Human history ===
==== Colonial era ====
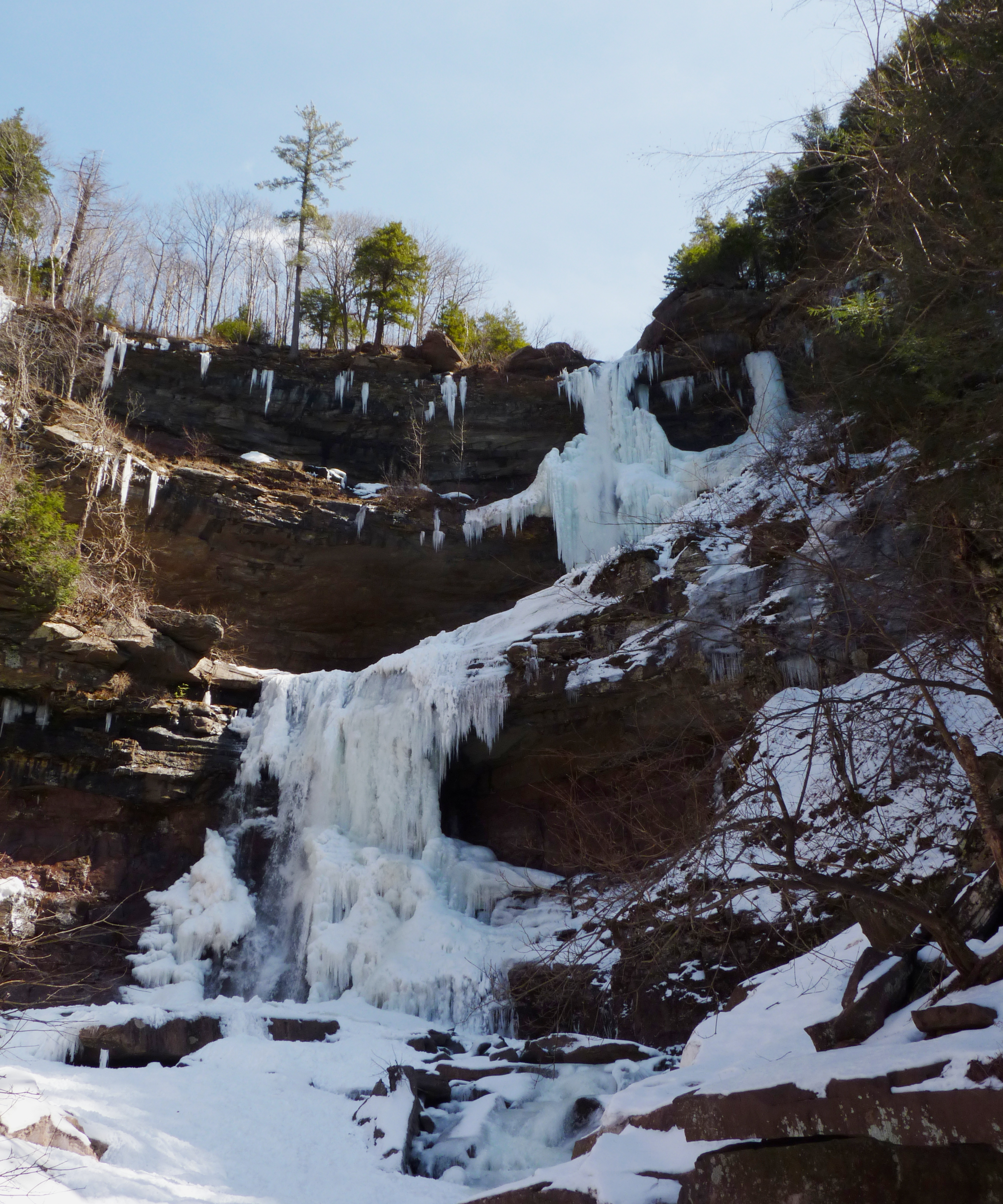
The Falls in winter

While the falls' existence was known by indigenous peoples of the Hudson Valley prior to European colonization, it had a minor role for them, who generally avoided the Catskill Mountains due to the limited agricultural possibilities of higher elevations, though they occasionally ventured into the mountains to hunt game. Thomas Cole populated the falls with an occasional Indian in his earliest paintings.

The falls' name, like that of the features around it, probably came from a later corruption of the name Catskill by English-speaking colonists of the early 18th century. "Cat" could mean Bobcat or Mountain Lion, while "kill" means stream in Dutch, the main language of the first European colonists of the 17th century.

Early American naturalist John Bartram and his son William visited the falls on his famous 1753 expedition to the area. He wrote about it in "A Journey to Ye Cat Skill Mountains with Billy," one of the earliest Catskill travelogues. He described it as "the great gulf that swallowed all down" and estimated their height at approximately a hundred feet (31 m), in a somewhat hurried account. However, he may have written his patron Peter Collinson a more detailed version, and his son William may have included a sketch.

==== Hudson River School ====
The waterfalls' fame in America really began when Washington Irving mentioned them in his story published during 1819, "Rip Van Winkle". Prior to that time Americans tended to regard the mountains and valleys of upstate New York as an unsafe region populated by savage natives. The famous painting, "The Murder of Jane McCrea" by Kingston, New York, native John Vanderlyn, best illustrates this local attitude. It wasn't until after the War of 1812 when the frontier shifted far to the west, that attitudes changed and people began to regard the lofty heights around the Hudson River valley as something scenic rather than ominous or fearsome. About the same time the profitability of local farming began to decrease due to cheap grain shipped east by an Erie Canal, usable in stages while under construction. Irving's story invited Cole and others to discover the valley when Irving introduced the Falls of the Kaaterskill in "Rip Van Winkle". Irving wrote the following passage about Rip reawakening after a slumber of 20 years and walking home:

At length he reached to where the ravine had opened through the cliffs to the amphitheatre; but no traces of such an opening remained. The rocks presented a high impenetrable wall, over which the torrent came tumbling in a sheet of feathery foam, and fell into a deep broad basin, black from the shadows of the surrounding forest.

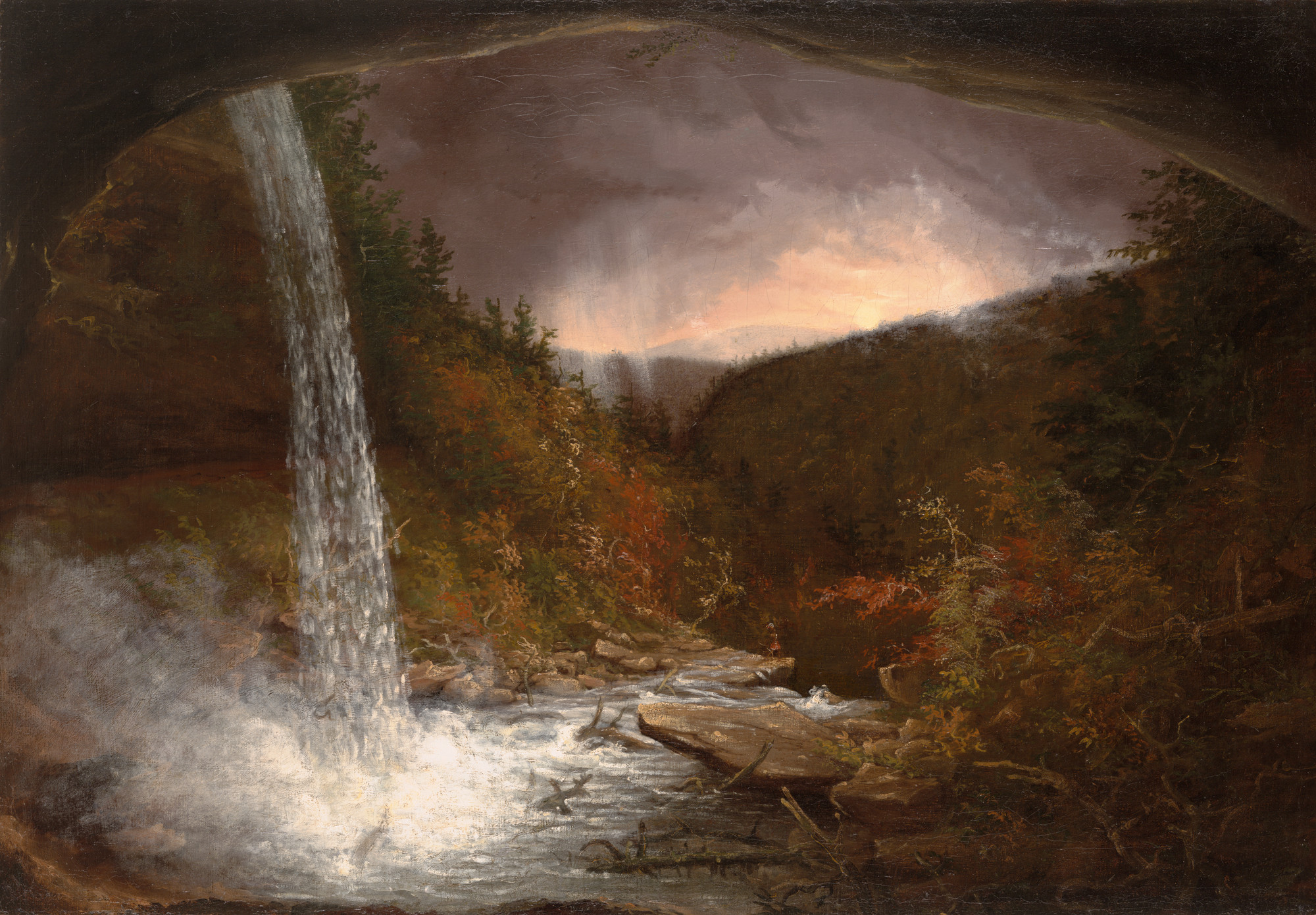
Kaaterskill Falls by Thomas Cole, 1826

Pioneering Hudson River School artist Thomas Cole was interested in the story, and took a steamboat ride up the River Hudson, stopping at West Point then going north to Catskill, NY where he ventured into Kaaterskill Clove during October 1825. The resulting paintings were reproduced on the front page of the New York Evening Post and during an era of Erie Canal wealth made the Hudson River valley, and scenic locations like Kaaterskill Falls, some of the foremost and famous tourist destinations in the rapidly expanding United States. Cole's influential paintings from that visit inspired the first real generation of truly American artists for whom a journey to the Clove, Kaaterskill Falls and Charles Beach's Catskill Mountain House became something of a pilgrimage. The earliest known painting of the front of the Falls by Thomas Cole is dated 1826 is in the Westervelt Warner Museum in Tuscaloosa, Alabama. Nearby Palenville, New York is considered to be the first art colony in the United States as a result (noted by Dr. Roland Van Zandt, author of The Catskill Mountain House, pages 175-178). Other artists who painted images of the falls included Frederic Edwin Church, Sanford Gifford, Winslow Homer, Max Eglau, Richard William Hubbard and John Frederick Kensett. Their work attracted affluent visitors to the Catskill Mountain House and the other hotels established near it later.

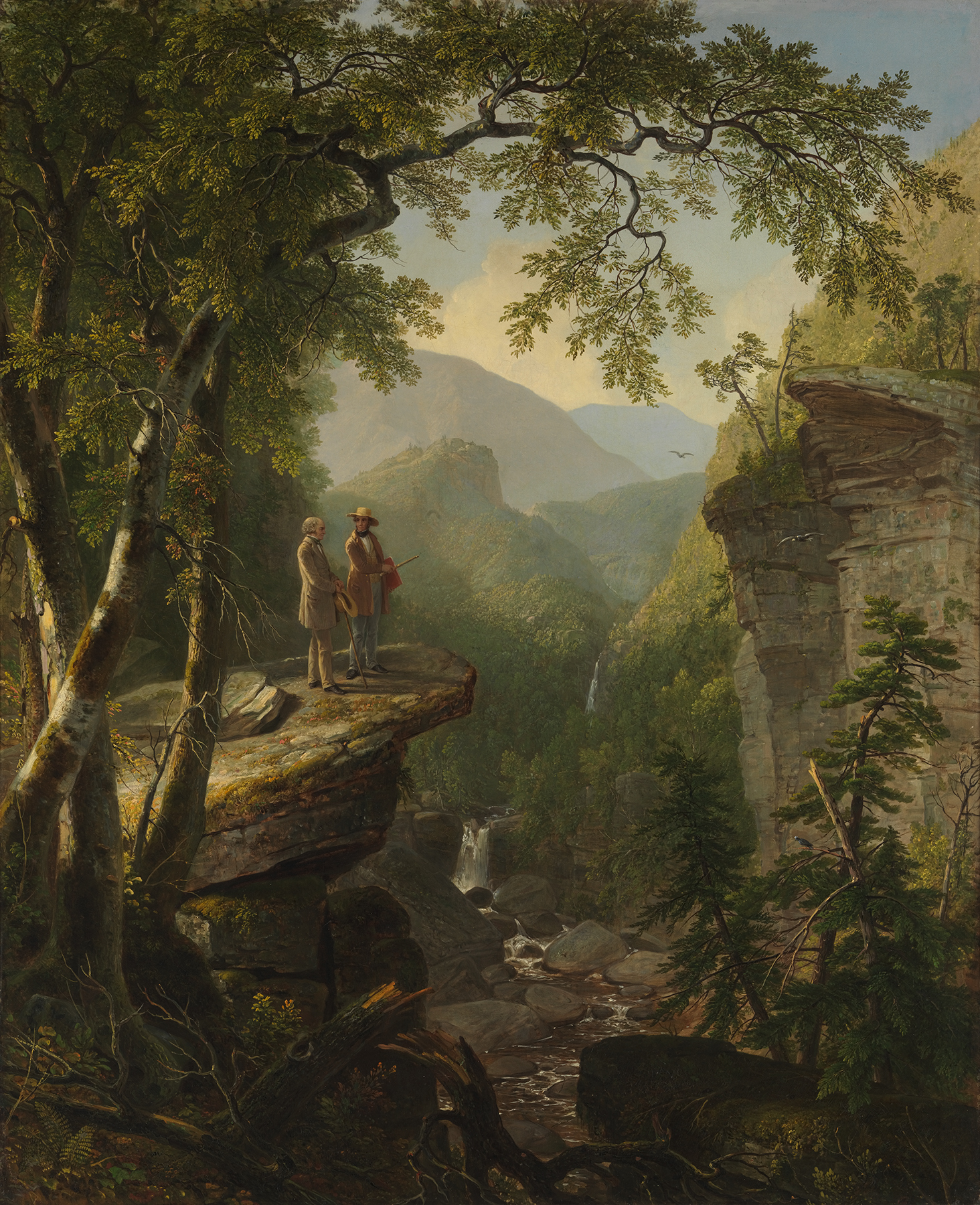
Asher Durand's Kindred Spirits, 1849, with the falls in the background.

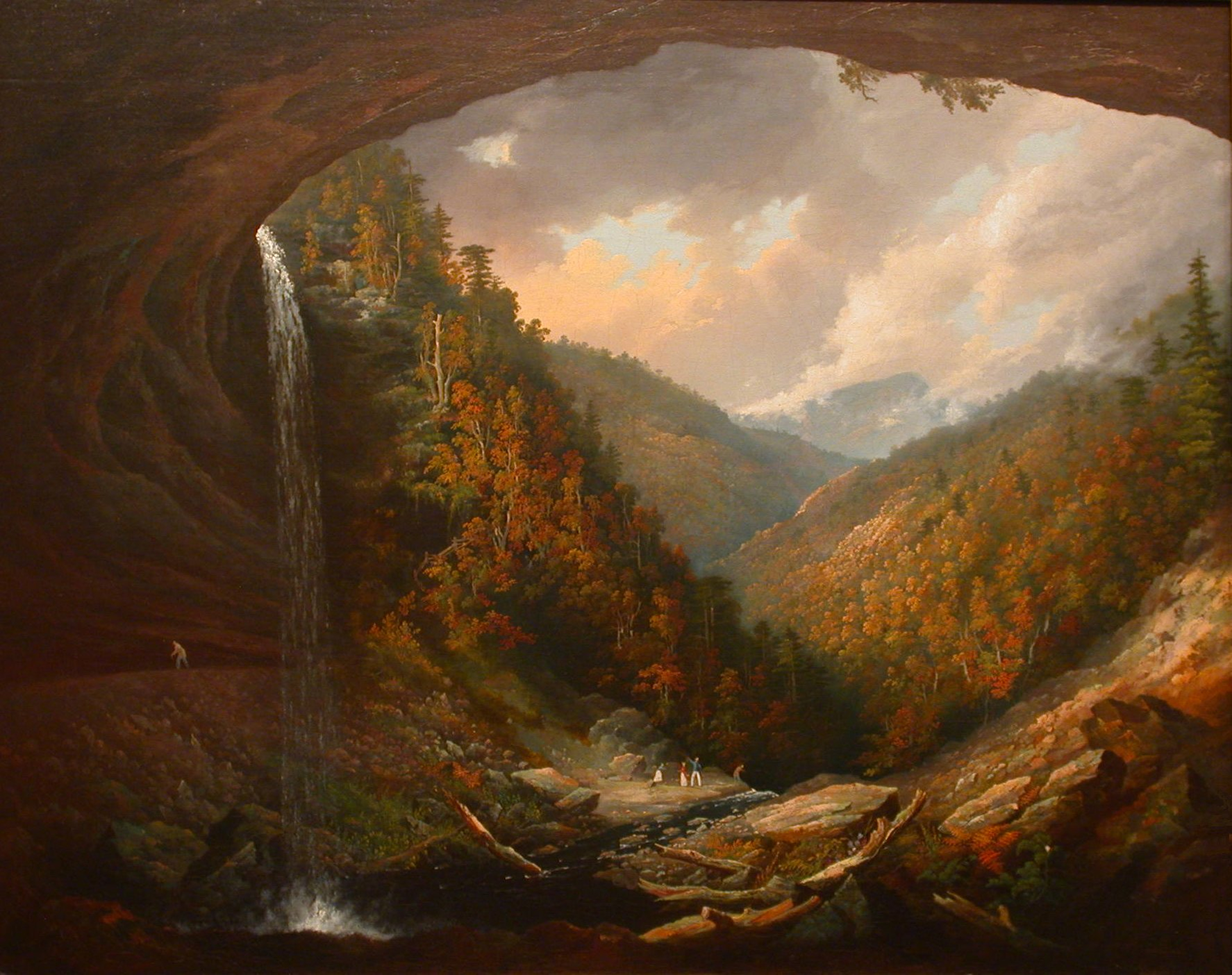
Kaaterskill Falls on the Catskill Mountains, by William Guy Wall, 1826–27, Honolulu Museum of Art

One of the best-known depictions of the falls is Asher Durand's Kindred Spirits (1849), a stylized rendition. It eulogized the recently deceased Thomas Cole by depicting him and William Cullen Bryant standing on Fawn's Leap looking out over a landscape that synthesized the falls and parts of the surrounding clove, including Haines Falls, into a landscape that, while visually striking, is really an imagined view of the falls. Prior to the painting's execution, during 1836, Bryant had complemented Cole's visualizations with versification when he wrote "Catterskill Falls", which described a wintertime encounter:

Midst greens and shades the Catterskill leaps,
From cliffs where the wood-flower clings;
All summer he moistens his verdant steeps,
With the sweet light spray of the mountain-springs,
And he shakes the woods on the mountain-side,
When they drip with the rains of autumn-tide.
But when, in the forest bare and old,
The blast of December calls,
He builds, in the starlight clear and cold,
A palace of ice where his torrent falls,
With turret, and arch, and fretwork fair,
And pillars blue as the summer air.

The phenomenon he described — the formation of an ice column by the falls during particularly cold stretches of winter — was well known to frequent visitors.

At some time during the 19th century the falls were used to power a tannery. The Laurel House, a nearby hotel, acquired the water rights to Kaaterskill Creek and dammed it during tourist season, charging spectators below the falls a fee to watch as the waters were unleashed and the waterfall "activated". Like the nearby Catskill Mountain House, the Laurel House was razed by the state.

=== The Bayard of Dogs ===
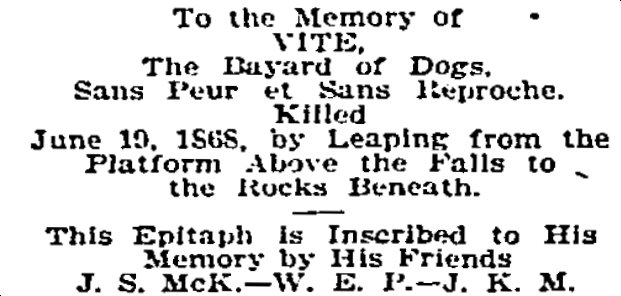

On the left side of the falls, halfway between the middle and top level there is a worn engraving that is dated 1868. It is dedicated to the "Bayard of Dogs" "A tragic story of a dog's devotion to his master, even unto death, is graven deep on a tablet hewn in the face of a rock beside the Kaaterskill Falls at the time of its occurrence." Local legend suggests that on June 19 of every year, the spaniel haunts the vicinity of the falls and "as the hands of the clock mark the witching hour, a succession of short, sharp barks is heard followed by the flight of the apparition through the air over the falls into the precipice, whence arises a prolonged howl which echoes and re-echoes among the Cimmerian recesses of Sunset Gorge and the forest clad slope of High Peak Mountain"

=== Public ownership ===
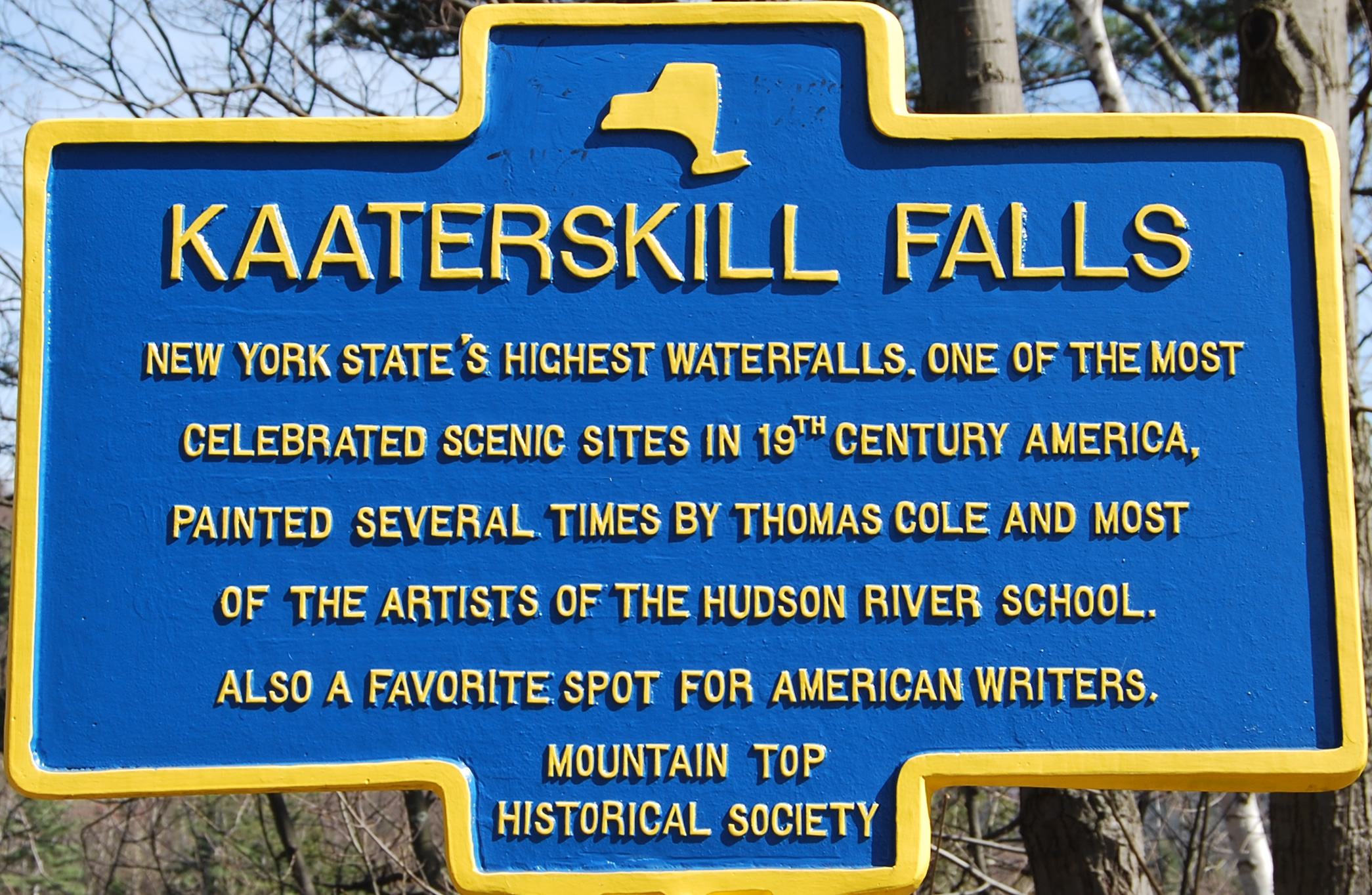
New York State historical marker for the falls.

During 1885 New York State established the Forest Preserve. The "forever wild" requirement helped protect the area from logging and commercial development, once the waterfalls area became owned by the state during the early 20th century. They are now part of the North Mountain Wild Forest, a Forest Preserve Unit owned and managed by the New York State Department of Environmental Conservation (DEC).

The Kaaterskill Hotel was never rebuilt after a 1920s fire, and the Catskill Mountain House itself was burned to the ground by the State Conservation Department (the forerunner to DEC) in 1963 after falling into severe disrepair. The falls and the surrounding area were featured prominently by a 2002 PBS documentary, "America's First River, Bill Moyers on the Hudson."

== Access ==
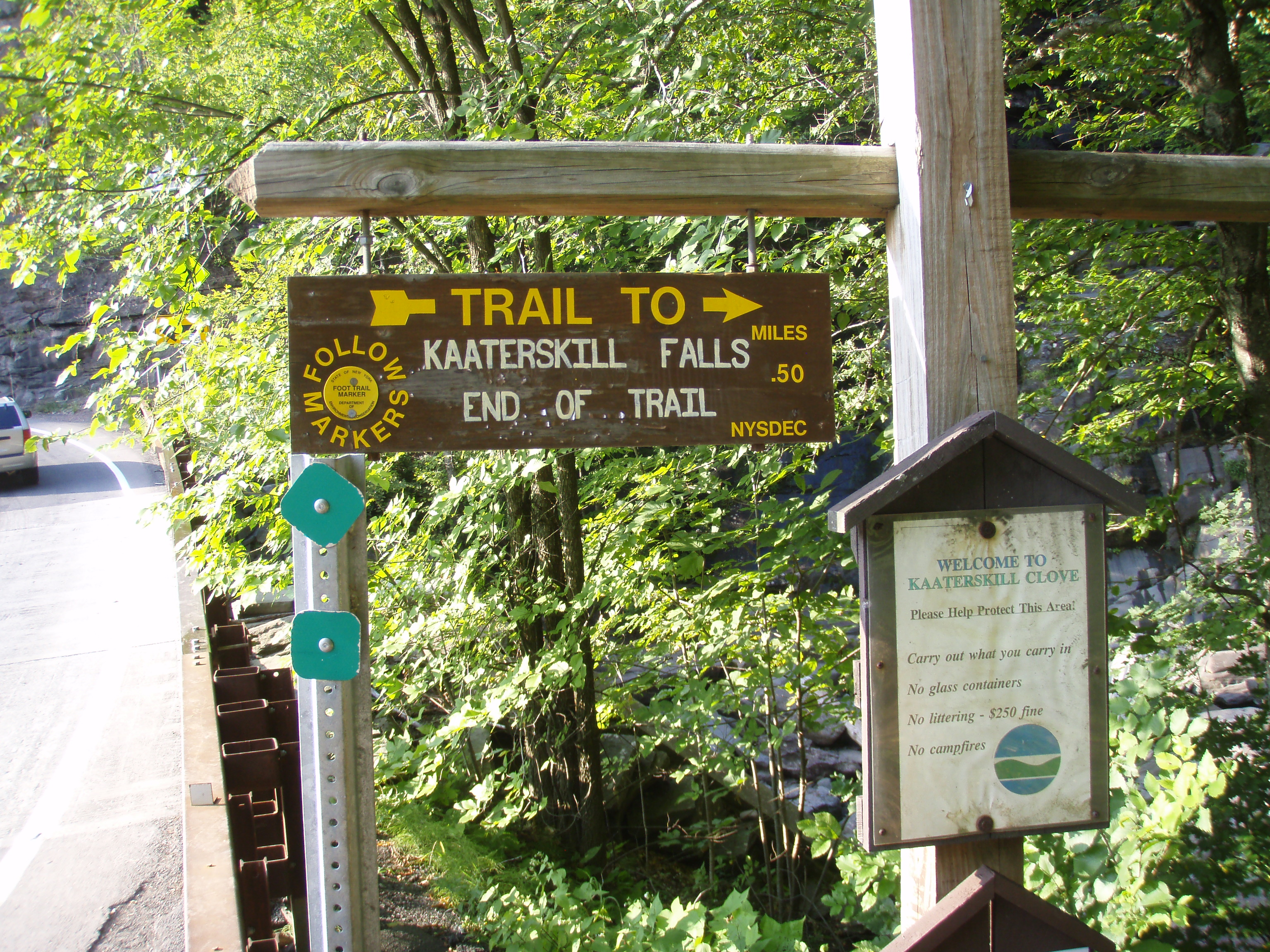
The sign on Route 23A that guides people to a hiking trail to Kaaterskill Falls.

While the falls are on public land, until recently they could only be reached via the Kaaterskill Falls Trail, a state-maintained yellow-blazed path running 0.4 mile (650 m) uphill from New York State Route 23A, the only road through the clove. This presented two safety problems. First, the trail itself climbs rather steeply from the road, along the sometimes steep and rocky slopes alongside the creek. Second, the trail is served by two parking lots along 23A, both of which require a walk of at least 0.2 mile (400 m) to reach the trailhead at Bastion Falls, just above 23A at a bend in the road. Due to both the rugged surrounding terrain and the limitations placed on Forest Preserve land by the state constitution, New York's Department of Transportation (DOT) has been unable to expand the narrow shoulder on either side of the road, requiring that visitors walk very close to high-speed traffic, including trucks, some of which are in the middle of descending a pronounced grade.

These concerns were alleviated by completion in 2016 of trail improvements to allow access from the Laurel House trailhead. These include a wheelchair accessible gravel path to an overlook platform, a 115-foot hiking bridge over Spruce Creek, and a new foot trail with stone staircase down to the middle pool, creating a link between the top and bottom of the falls.

Access to the falls was closed during the onset of the COVID-19 pandemic to minimize potential transmission of the virus. When it reopened later that spring, the area experienced a significant increase in tourism, resulting in parking issues on Route 23A and littering in and around the Falls. Addressing the issue was made complicated by the fact that Route 23A is maintained by the NYS Department of Transportation and the land is owned by NYS Department of Environmental Conservation. The Town of Hunter began towing illegally parked vehicles on Route 23A to reduce traffic and pedestrian safety hazards, while advocating for visitors to park at safer locations. Further restrictions were implemented with the closure of the Molly Smith parking lot, located above the base of the Kaaterskill Falls trail on Route 23A, in May 2021. This lot continues to be closed seasonally as of May 2024.

=== Safety issues ===
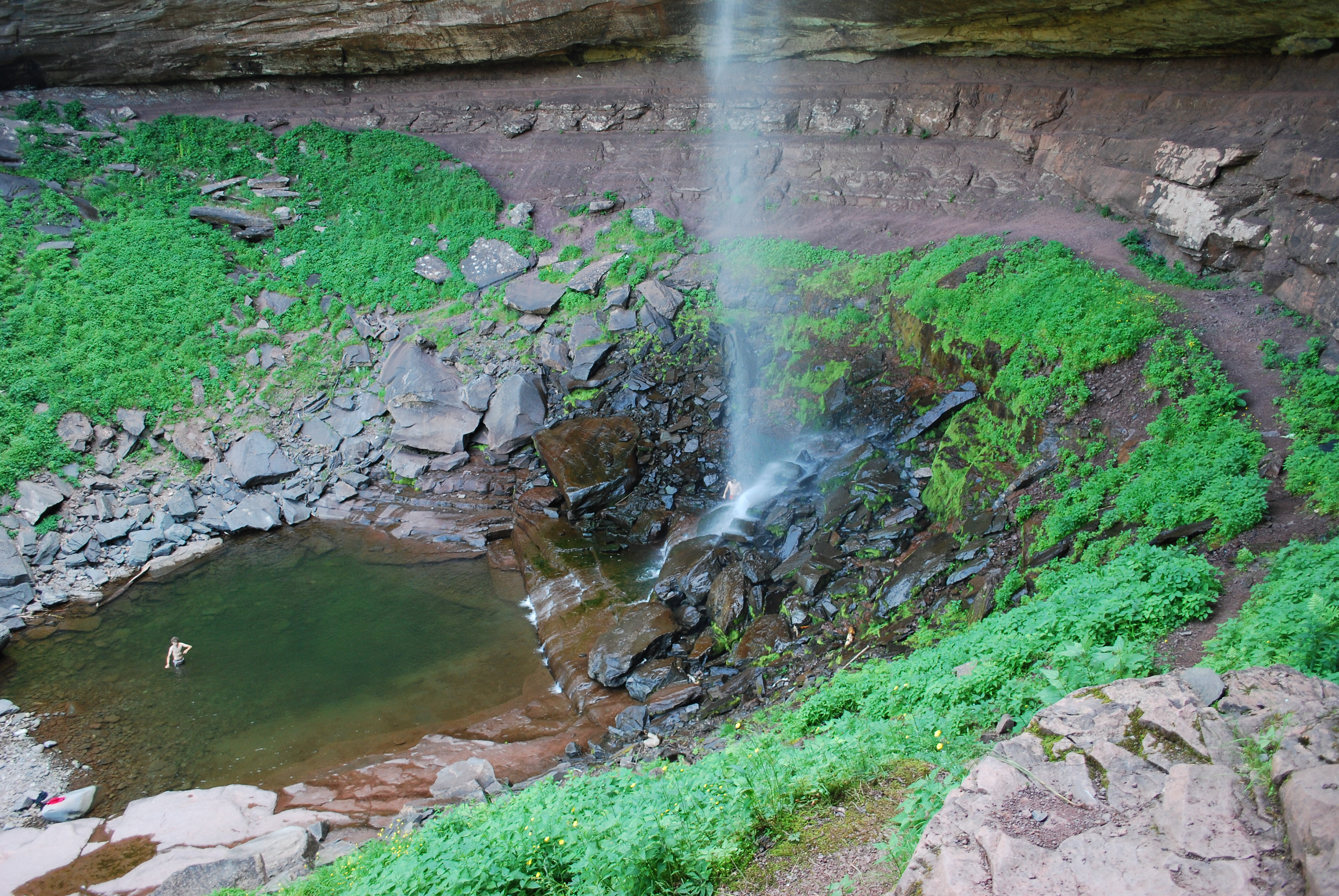
Hikers swim in the upper falls pool.

The Kaaterskill Falls Trail was built during 1967 as the southern terminus of the popular Escarpment Trail, which runs along the ridge that bounds the Catskills to the northeast. During the late 1980s, DEC had to close the trail above the falls and build a new southern section along Schutt Road to limit the state's liability for injuries and fatalities that occurred near the falls. Nine people have died at Kaaterskill Falls between 1988 and 2021.

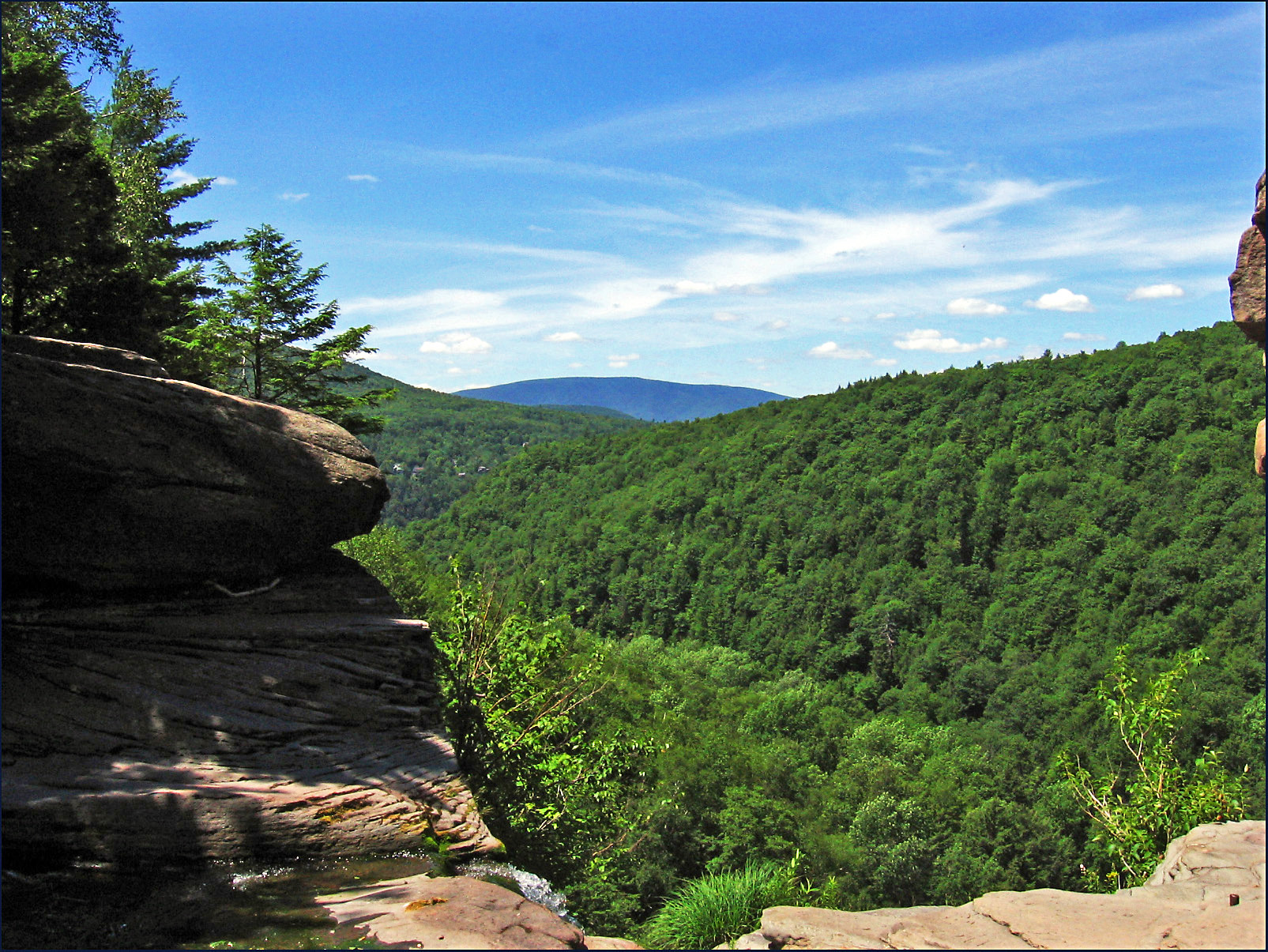
View to Hunter Mountain from the top of the waterfalls, an area officially closed to hiking.

Presently, the trail officially ends, and is blocked off, at the lower of the two falls. However, the former treadway is still usable, and many visitors continue past the brush pile to get closer to the falls. Some venture into the natural amphitheater behind the falls, and it is here and from the ledge above the falls that more than one hiker has fallen to death. The height of the upper interior rim of the upper falls amphitheater is deceptively high and the footing is tenuous. During 2004 a Putnam County woman sued the state over injuries sustained by her fall into the pool from the top of the falls, arguing the state had a responsibility to put a barrier there. Four years later a state Court of Claims judge ruled against her, saying the danger "was open and obvious to anyone employing the reasonable use of her senses". The trail's junction with the current Escarpment Trail route just past the Laurel House site is also readily apparent due to the rock pile used to block it and the wood pole that once held mileage signs. It, too, is still used unofficially to reach the waterfalls.

Deaths at the falls nevertheless continued. Two in 2014 prompted the state to restrict access to the falls the next summer in order to build a new trail, stone steps, and fencing. A special rescue team was formed with the falls' terrain in mind. However, two people died in falls during 2016.

=== Visibility ===
For those not able to get too close to it, the waterfalls can be seen in their entirety in the distance from the northern approach to the summit of Kaaterskill High Peak, across the clove, and sometimes even from the fire tower on Hunter Mountain.

== See also ==
- List of waterfalls
