= Haines Falls, New York =

Hamlet in New York, United States

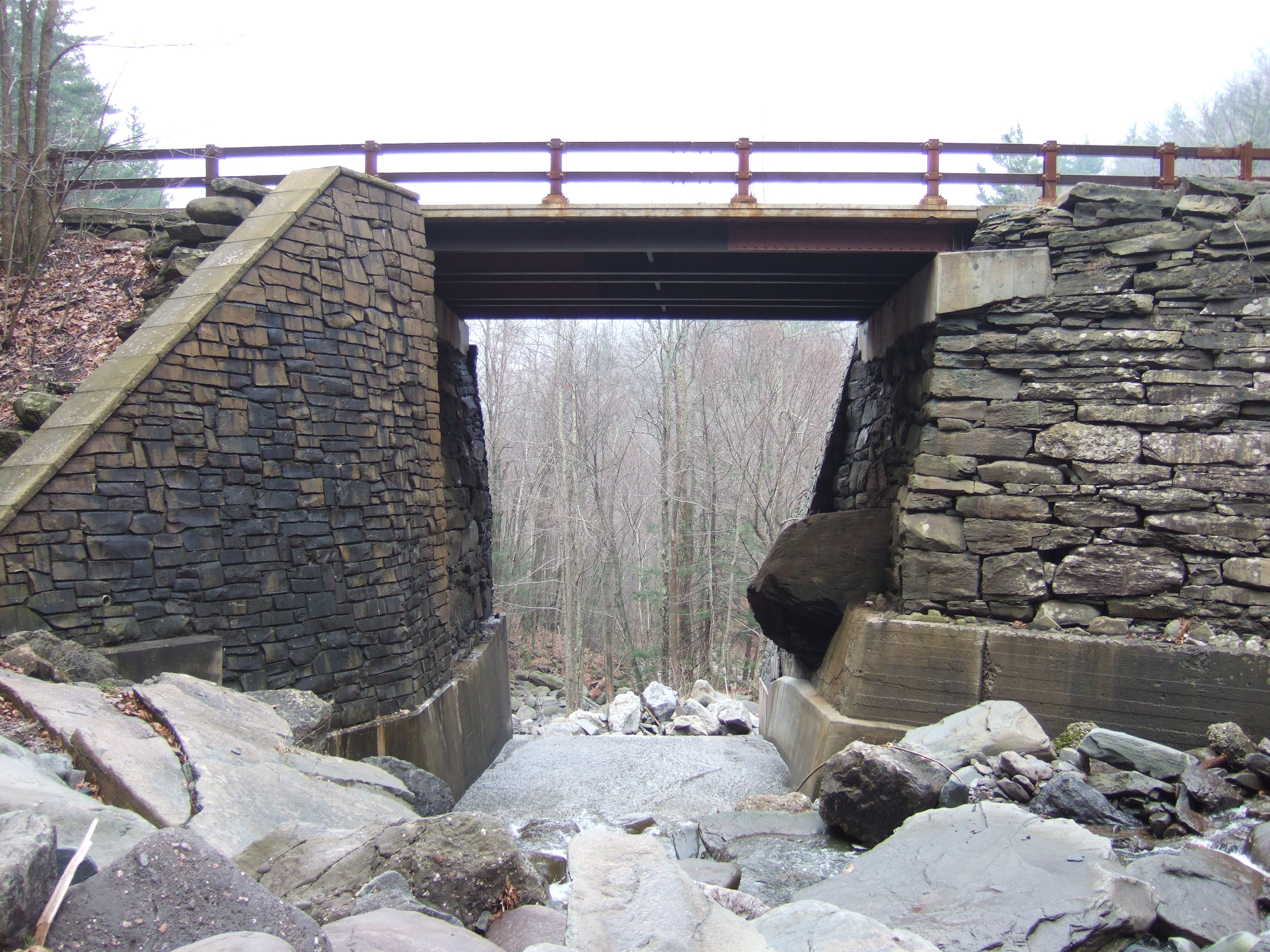
Underneath Bastion Falls along Rt. 23A

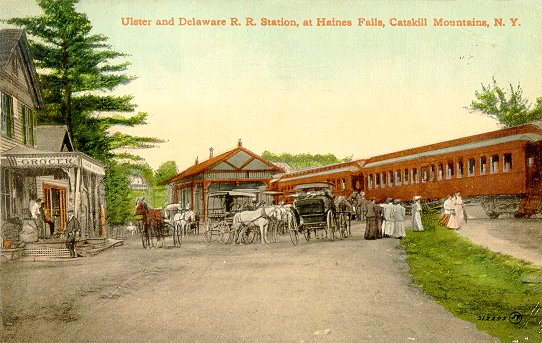
Haines Falls Station in 1902

Haines Falls is a hamlet (and census-designated place) located east of Tannersville in the Town of Hunter, in Greene County, New York, United States. Haines Falls is located at 42°11′45″N 74°5′49″W. The town's original name was "Haines Corners". As of the 2020 census, Haines Falls had a population of 249.

The hamlet of Haines Falls was always a mountain resort town, unlike Hunter and Palenville which had tanneries. Haines Falls is at the head of Kaaterskill Clove and is the former site of the Catskill Mountain House, Kaaterskill Hotel, and Laurel House which sat atop the famous Kaaterskill Falls. In 1825, Thomas Cole, founder of the Hudson River School of landscape painters, did his first Catskill mountain paintings in Haines Falls: Lake with Dead Trees at South Lake and the Kaaterskill Falls.

Major highways in Haines Falls include State Route 23A, Clum Hill Road, North Lake Road, and County Route 25. Horseshoe Bend is the location of many vehicle accidents and hikers who tumble off the falls.

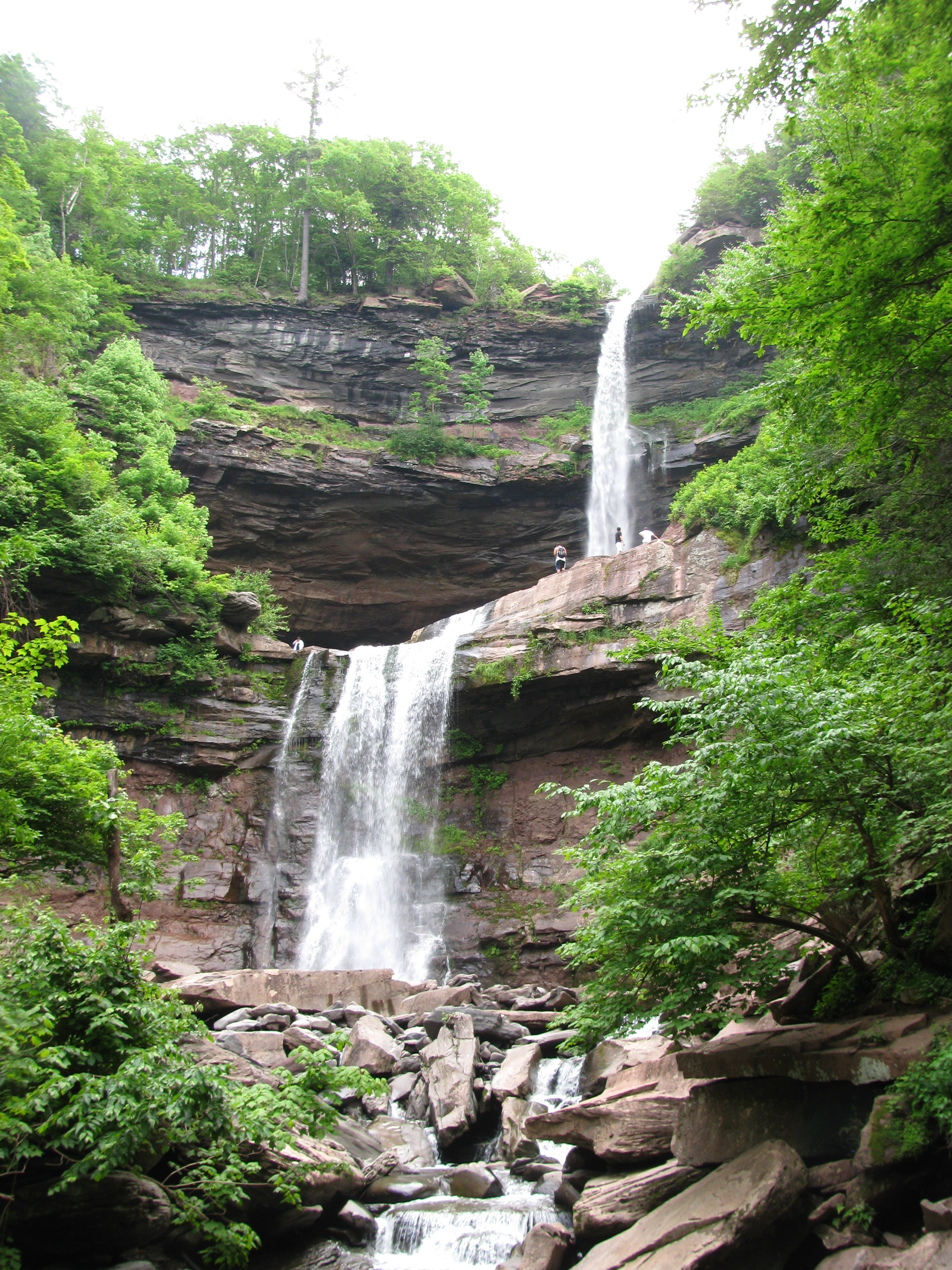
Kaaterskill Falls

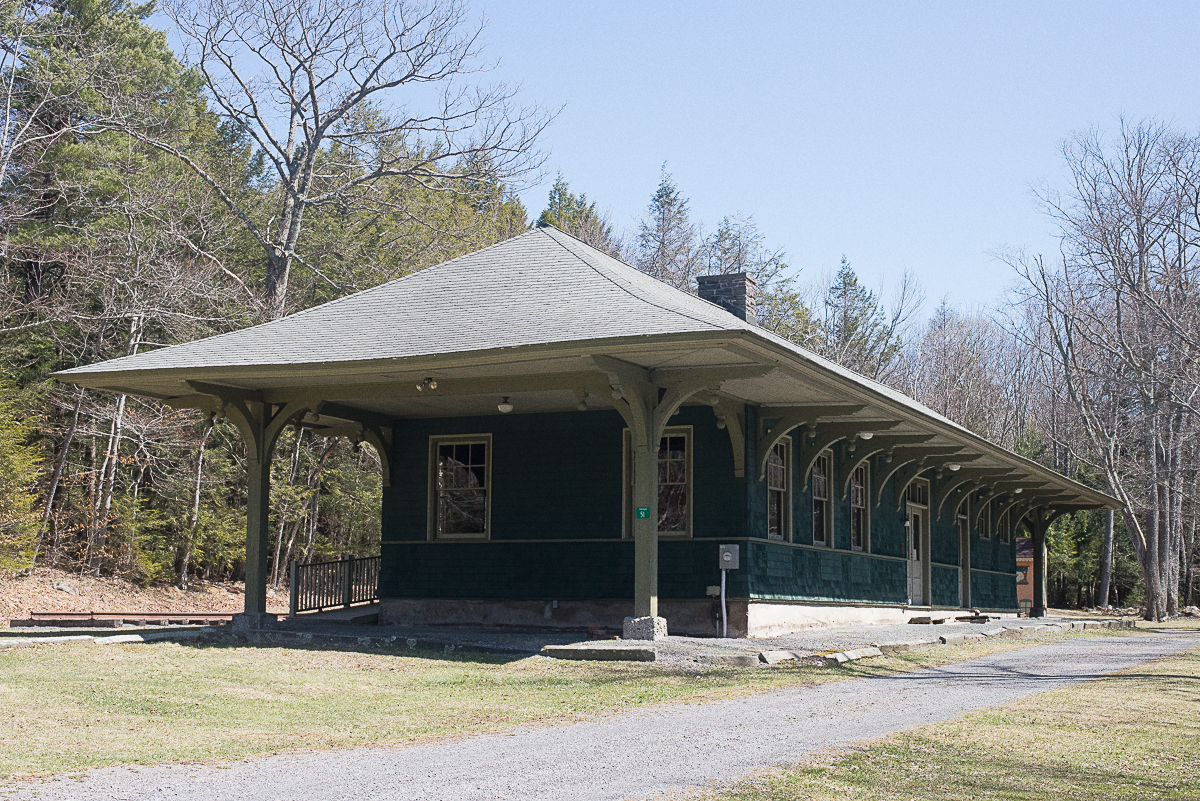
Ulster and Delaware Railroad depot in Haines Falls
