= List of minor planets: 513001–514000 =

The following is a partial list of minor planets, running from minor-planet number 513001 through 514000, inclusive. The primary data for this and other partial lists is based on JPL's "Small-Body Orbital Elements" and data available from the Minor Planet Center. Critical list information is also provided by the MPC, unless otherwise specified from Lowell Observatory. A detailed description of the table's columns and additional sources are given on the main page including a complete list of every page in this series, and a statistical break-up on the dynamical classification of minor planets.

Also see the summary list of all named bodies in numerical and alphabetical order, and the corresponding naming citations for the number range of this particular list. New namings may only be added to this list after official publication, as the preannouncement of names is condemned by the Working Group for Small Bodies Nomenclature of the International Astronomical Union.

| Near-Earth obj. | MBA (inner) | MBA (outer) | Centaur |
| Mars-crosser | MBA (middle) | Jupiter trojan | Trans-Neptunian obj. |
| Unclassified |

== 513001–513100 ==
| Designation | | | Discovery | | | Properties | | Ref |
| Permanent | Provisional | Named after | Date | Site | Discoverer(s) | Category | Diam. | Ref |
|---|---|---|---|---|---|---|---|---|
| 513001 | 2017 UT_{42} | — | November 18, 2001 | Kitt Peak | Spacewatch | · | 2.0 km | MPC · JPL |
| 513002 | 2017 UV_{44} | — | March 14, 2007 | Mount Lemmon | Mount Lemmon Survey | · | 1.4 km | MPC · JPL |
| 513003 | 2017 UL_{45} | — | October 12, 1998 | Kitt Peak | Spacewatch | · | 870 m | MPC · JPL |
| 513004 | 2017 UM_{45} | — | December 18, 2009 | Mount Lemmon | Mount Lemmon Survey | (5) | 1.6 km | MPC · JPL |
| 513005 | 2017 UN_{45} | — | October 14, 2009 | Mount Lemmon | Mount Lemmon Survey | · | 1.2 km | MPC · JPL |
| 513006 | 2017 UB_{46} | — | September 29, 2010 | Mount Lemmon | Mount Lemmon Survey | · | 560 m | MPC · JPL |
| 513007 | 2017 UK_{46} | — | May 8, 2008 | Kitt Peak | Spacewatch | · | 790 m | MPC · JPL |
| 513008 | 2017 UO_{46} | — | December 13, 2010 | Mount Lemmon | Mount Lemmon Survey | V | 720 m | MPC · JPL |
| 513009 | 2017 UP_{46} | — | February 26, 2014 | Haleakala | Pan-STARRS 1 | EOS | 1.5 km | MPC · JPL |
| 513010 | 2017 UR_{46} | — | September 27, 2008 | Mount Lemmon | Mount Lemmon Survey | · | 1.5 km | MPC · JPL |
| 513011 | 2017 UO_{47} | — | January 14, 2011 | Mount Lemmon | Mount Lemmon Survey | · | 1.2 km | MPC · JPL |
| 513012 | 2017 UV_{47} | — | November 2, 2008 | Mount Lemmon | Mount Lemmon Survey | · | 2.1 km | MPC · JPL |
| 513013 | 2017 UZ_{47} | — | January 31, 2009 | Mount Lemmon | Mount Lemmon Survey | · | 2.0 km | MPC · JPL |
| 513014 | 2017 UJ_{48} | — | April 1, 2011 | Mount Lemmon | Mount Lemmon Survey | PHO | 750 m | MPC · JPL |
| 513015 | 2017 UL_{48} | — | May 21, 2015 | Haleakala | Pan-STARRS 1 | · | 2.6 km | MPC · JPL |
| 513016 | 2017 UX_{48} | — | February 9, 2010 | Catalina | CSS | · | 1.5 km | MPC · JPL |
| 513017 | 2017 UL_{49} | — | March 25, 2006 | Kitt Peak | Spacewatch | HNS | 1.0 km | MPC · JPL |
| 513018 | 2017 UY_{49} | — | January 14, 2002 | Kitt Peak | Spacewatch | · | 2.9 km | MPC · JPL |
| 513019 | 2017 UX_{50} | — | October 9, 2004 | Kitt Peak | Spacewatch | CYB | 4.8 km | MPC · JPL |
| 513020 | 2017 UY_{50} | — | November 17, 2007 | Kitt Peak | Spacewatch | · | 1.0 km | MPC · JPL |
| 513021 | 2017 VS | — | August 12, 2007 | Siding Spring | SSS | · | 2.0 km | MPC · JPL |
| 513022 | 2017 VD_{1} | — | March 19, 2013 | Haleakala | Pan-STARRS 1 | · | 1.1 km | MPC · JPL |
| 513023 | 2017 VT_{2} | — | November 9, 2013 | Haleakala | Pan-STARRS 1 | ADE | 1.9 km | MPC · JPL |
| 513024 | 2017 VF_{3} | — | December 2, 2013 | XuYi | PMO NEO Survey Program | · | 1.3 km | MPC · JPL |
| 513025 | 2017 VN_{3} | — | November 10, 2006 | Kitt Peak | Spacewatch | · | 5.0 km | MPC · JPL |
| 513026 | 2017 VP_{3} | — | April 16, 2010 | WISE | WISE | (1118) | 4.4 km | MPC · JPL |
| 513027 | 2017 VS_{3} | — | August 21, 2006 | Kitt Peak | Spacewatch | EOS | 2.0 km | MPC · JPL |
| 513028 | 2017 VV_{3} | — | November 15, 2006 | Catalina | CSS | EOS | 2.1 km | MPC · JPL |
| 513029 | 2017 VW_{3} | — | September 21, 2011 | Catalina | CSS | · | 3.4 km | MPC · JPL |
| 513030 | 2017 VZ_{3} | — | August 29, 2006 | Catalina | CSS | EOS | 2.4 km | MPC · JPL |
| 513031 | 2017 VM_{4} | — | January 30, 2008 | Mount Lemmon | Mount Lemmon Survey | · | 3.0 km | MPC · JPL |
| 513032 | 2017 VT_{4} | — | November 4, 2004 | Kitt Peak | Spacewatch | · | 2.0 km | MPC · JPL |
| 513033 | 2017 VV_{4} | — | June 27, 2008 | Siding Spring | SSS | · | 1.9 km | MPC · JPL |
| 513034 | 2017 VW_{4} | — | August 25, 2012 | Catalina | CSS | · | 2.3 km | MPC · JPL |
| 513035 | 2017 VX_{4} | — | October 3, 1999 | Socorro | LINEAR | · | 1.1 km | MPC · JPL |
| 513036 | 2017 VY_{4} | — | August 27, 2006 | Anderson Mesa | LONEOS | · | 3.1 km | MPC · JPL |
| 513037 | 2017 VZ_{4} | — | November 4, 2004 | Kitt Peak | Spacewatch | · | 1.8 km | MPC · JPL |
| 513038 | 2017 VH_{5} | — | September 15, 2006 | Kitt Peak | Spacewatch | NYS | 710 m | MPC · JPL |
| 513039 | 2017 VK_{5} | — | May 7, 2010 | Mount Lemmon | Mount Lemmon Survey | · | 3.5 km | MPC · JPL |
| 513040 | 2017 VM_{5} | — | November 14, 2012 | Mount Lemmon | Mount Lemmon Survey | · | 2.1 km | MPC · JPL |
| 513041 | 2017 VT_{5} | — | January 29, 2006 | Kitt Peak | Spacewatch | GAL | 2.2 km | MPC · JPL |
| 513042 | 2017 VA_{6} | — | April 2, 2006 | Kitt Peak | Spacewatch | ADE | 2.2 km | MPC · JPL |
| 513043 | 2017 VG_{6} | — | September 29, 2010 | Mount Lemmon | Mount Lemmon Survey | · | 470 m | MPC · JPL |
| 513044 | 2017 VM_{7} | — | September 30, 2006 | Kitt Peak | Spacewatch | EOS | 1.7 km | MPC · JPL |
| 513045 | 2017 VN_{7} | — | February 13, 2010 | Kitt Peak | Spacewatch | WIT | 870 m | MPC · JPL |
| 513046 | 2017 VR_{7} | — | July 4, 2005 | Mount Lemmon | Mount Lemmon Survey | · | 2.5 km | MPC · JPL |
| 513047 | 2017 VV_{7} | — | October 3, 2006 | Mount Lemmon | Mount Lemmon Survey | · | 2.3 km | MPC · JPL |
| 513048 | 2017 VN_{9} | — | November 18, 2009 | Mount Lemmon | Mount Lemmon Survey | MAR | 970 m | MPC · JPL |
| 513049 | 2017 VA_{10} | — | February 1, 2008 | Kitt Peak | Spacewatch | TIR | 2.4 km | MPC · JPL |
| 513050 | 2017 VE_{10} | — | June 8, 2011 | Haleakala | Pan-STARRS 1 | · | 2.7 km | MPC · JPL |
| 513051 | 2017 VL_{10} | — | November 23, 2009 | Mount Lemmon | Mount Lemmon Survey | HNS | 1.3 km | MPC · JPL |
| 513052 | 2017 VM_{10} | — | April 13, 2010 | WISE | WISE | · | 5.7 km | MPC · JPL |
| 513053 | 2017 VS_{10} | — | December 15, 2006 | Kitt Peak | Spacewatch | · | 1.1 km | MPC · JPL |
| 513054 | 2017 VE_{12} | — | November 30, 1999 | Kitt Peak | Spacewatch | ERI | 1.4 km | MPC · JPL |
| 513055 | 2017 VO_{12} | — | November 5, 2007 | Mount Lemmon | Mount Lemmon Survey | PHO | 880 m | MPC · JPL |
| 513056 | 2017 VK_{14} | — | May 8, 1994 | Kitt Peak | Spacewatch | · | 1.2 km | MPC · JPL |
| 513057 | 2017 WJ_{12} | — | September 19, 2009 | Mount Lemmon | Mount Lemmon Survey | H | 460 m | MPC · JPL |
| 513058 | 2017 WF_{14} | — | October 7, 2004 | Kitt Peak | Spacewatch | · | 1.8 km | MPC · JPL |
| 513059 | 2017 WW_{16} | — | December 6, 2005 | Kitt Peak | Spacewatch | · | 990 m | MPC · JPL |
| 513060 | 2017 WQ_{17} | — | December 27, 2006 | Mount Lemmon | Mount Lemmon Survey | MAS | 820 m | MPC · JPL |
| 513061 | 2017 WR_{17} | — | February 12, 2004 | Kitt Peak | Spacewatch | · | 890 m | MPC · JPL |
| 513062 | 2017 WS_{17} | — | November 7, 2005 | Mauna Kea | A. Boattini | · | 890 m | MPC · JPL |
| 513063 | 2017 WU_{17} | — | September 18, 2003 | Kitt Peak | Spacewatch | · | 2.3 km | MPC · JPL |
| 513064 | 2017 WG_{18} | — | March 24, 2006 | Mount Lemmon | Mount Lemmon Survey | · | 1.6 km | MPC · JPL |
| 513065 | 2017 WH_{18} | — | September 2, 2010 | Mount Lemmon | Mount Lemmon Survey | · | 670 m | MPC · JPL |
| 513066 | 2017 WU_{18} | — | November 15, 2006 | Kitt Peak | Spacewatch | · | 2.5 km | MPC · JPL |
| 513067 | 2017 WN_{19} | — | November 16, 2006 | Kitt Peak | Spacewatch | VER | 2.7 km | MPC · JPL |
| 513068 | 2017 WO_{19} | — | May 10, 2005 | Kitt Peak | Spacewatch | · | 1.9 km | MPC · JPL |
| 513069 | 2017 WW_{19} | — | October 11, 2006 | Siding Spring | SSS | · | 3.8 km | MPC · JPL |
| 513070 | 2017 WH_{20} | — | November 2, 2013 | Mount Lemmon | Mount Lemmon Survey | MAR | 1.0 km | MPC · JPL |
| 513071 | 2017 WL_{20} | — | December 4, 2013 | Haleakala | Pan-STARRS 1 | · | 1.8 km | MPC · JPL |
| 513072 | 2017 WM_{20} | — | January 10, 2011 | Mount Lemmon | Mount Lemmon Survey | · | 1.6 km | MPC · JPL |
| 513073 | 2017 WQ_{20} | — | September 28, 2009 | Kitt Peak | Spacewatch | NYS | 970 m | MPC · JPL |
| 513074 | 2017 WX_{20} | — | January 23, 1998 | Kitt Peak | Spacewatch | · | 1.4 km | MPC · JPL |
| 513075 | 2017 WA_{21} | — | June 21, 2012 | Kitt Peak | Spacewatch | EUN | 1.3 km | MPC · JPL |
| 513076 | 2017 WC_{21} | — | March 29, 2008 | Catalina | CSS | PHO | 750 m | MPC · JPL |
| 513077 | 2017 WE_{21} | — | March 6, 2011 | Kitt Peak | Spacewatch | · | 1.4 km | MPC · JPL |
| 513078 | 2017 WF_{21} | — | January 19, 2001 | Kitt Peak | Spacewatch | WIT | 1.2 km | MPC · JPL |
| 513079 | 2017 WG_{21} | — | November 20, 2000 | Kitt Peak | Spacewatch | · | 3.3 km | MPC · JPL |
| 513080 | 2017 WJ_{21} | — | April 28, 2004 | Kitt Peak | Spacewatch | · | 1.3 km | MPC · JPL |
| 513081 | 2017 WK_{21} | — | March 31, 2014 | Mount Lemmon | Mount Lemmon Survey | · | 2.9 km | MPC · JPL |
| 513082 | 2017 WL_{21} | — | November 29, 2013 | Mount Lemmon | Mount Lemmon Survey | · | 2.0 km | MPC · JPL |
| 513083 | 2017 WM_{21} | — | February 27, 2006 | Kitt Peak | Spacewatch | · | 2.0 km | MPC · JPL |
| 513084 | 2017 WP_{21} | — | October 7, 2008 | Mount Lemmon | Mount Lemmon Survey | · | 3.6 km | MPC · JPL |
| 513085 | 2017 WR_{21} | — | November 4, 2004 | Catalina | CSS | · | 1.8 km | MPC · JPL |
| 513086 | 2017 WS_{21} | — | December 14, 2013 | Mount Lemmon | Mount Lemmon Survey | · | 1.3 km | MPC · JPL |
| 513087 | 2017 WV_{21} | — | February 5, 2011 | Haleakala | Pan-STARRS 1 | · | 1.1 km | MPC · JPL |
| 513088 | 2017 WY_{21} | — | May 9, 2006 | Mount Lemmon | Mount Lemmon Survey | · | 780 m | MPC · JPL |
| 513089 | 2017 WZ_{21} | — | November 1, 2008 | Kitt Peak | Spacewatch | · | 2.4 km | MPC · JPL |
| 513090 | 2017 WC_{22} | — | October 12, 2013 | Catalina | CSS | · | 1.3 km | MPC · JPL |
| 513091 | 2017 WD_{22} | — | July 5, 2000 | Kitt Peak | Spacewatch | · | 1.0 km | MPC · JPL |
| 513092 | 2017 WG_{22} | — | March 4, 2011 | Kitt Peak | Spacewatch | NYS | 970 m | MPC · JPL |
| 513093 | 2017 WL_{22} | — | June 16, 2010 | WISE | WISE | CYB | 5.3 km | MPC · JPL |
| 513094 | 2017 WQ_{22} | — | December 1, 2000 | Kitt Peak | Spacewatch | · | 810 m | MPC · JPL |
| 513095 | 2017 WV_{22} | — | January 1, 2014 | Haleakala | Pan-STARRS 1 | · | 1.3 km | MPC · JPL |
| 513096 | 2017 WF_{23} | — | December 12, 2012 | Mount Lemmon | Mount Lemmon Survey | EOS | 1.9 km | MPC · JPL |
| 513097 | 2017 WM_{23} | — | February 27, 2014 | Kitt Peak | Spacewatch | EOS | 1.7 km | MPC · JPL |
| 513098 | 2017 WO_{23} | — | February 12, 2008 | Mount Lemmon | Mount Lemmon Survey | · | 2.7 km | MPC · JPL |
| 513099 | 2017 WT_{23} | — | August 8, 2012 | Haleakala | Pan-STARRS 1 | · | 1.8 km | MPC · JPL |
| 513100 | 2017 WV_{23} | — | May 13, 2009 | Kitt Peak | Spacewatch | · | 3.5 km | MPC · JPL |

== 513101–513200 ==
back to top

| Designation | | | Discovery | | | Properties | | Ref |
| Permanent | Provisional | Named after | Date | Site | Discoverer(s) | Category | Diam. | Ref |
|---|---|---|---|---|---|---|---|---|
| 513101 | 2017 WY_{23} | — | November 18, 2006 | Socorro | LINEAR | · | 4.9 km | MPC · JPL |
| 513102 | 2017 WF_{24} | — | November 27, 2006 | Mount Lemmon | Mount Lemmon Survey | · | 1.0 km | MPC · JPL |
| 513103 | 2017 WK_{24} | — | October 29, 2003 | Kitt Peak | Spacewatch | V | 510 m | MPC · JPL |
| 513104 | 2017 WO_{24} | — | September 2, 2010 | Socorro | LINEAR | · | 610 m | MPC · JPL |
| 513105 | 2017 WS_{24} | — | September 17, 2006 | Catalina | CSS | · | 2.3 km | MPC · JPL |
| 513106 | 2017 WZ_{24} | — | August 31, 2005 | Kitt Peak | Spacewatch | · | 1.7 km | MPC · JPL |
| 513107 | 2017 WO_{25} | — | January 8, 2010 | Catalina | CSS | · | 1.8 km | MPC · JPL |
| 513108 | 2017 WB_{26} | — | January 6, 2005 | Catalina | CSS | · | 2.8 km | MPC · JPL |
| 513109 | 2017 WD_{26} | — | January 21, 2014 | Haleakala | Pan-STARRS 1 | · | 1.0 km | MPC · JPL |
| 513110 | 2017 WH_{26} | — | December 29, 2014 | Haleakala | Pan-STARRS 1 | PHO | 1.2 km | MPC · JPL |
| 513111 | 2017 WK_{26} | — | August 24, 2011 | Siding Spring | SSS | EOS | 1.4 km | MPC · JPL |
| 513112 | 2017 WV_{26} | — | December 27, 2005 | Mount Lemmon | Mount Lemmon Survey | (5) | 1.3 km | MPC · JPL |
| 513113 | 2017 WY_{26} | — | December 26, 2005 | Kitt Peak | Spacewatch | · | 850 m | MPC · JPL |
| 513114 | 2017 WZ_{26} | — | November 16, 2006 | Kitt Peak | Spacewatch | LIX | 3.2 km | MPC · JPL |
| 513115 | 2017 WA_{27} | — | September 20, 2011 | Kitt Peak | Spacewatch | VER | 2.7 km | MPC · JPL |
| 513116 | 2017 WE_{27} | — | November 11, 2004 | Kitt Peak | Spacewatch | HNS | 1.2 km | MPC · JPL |
| 513117 | 2017 WF_{27} | — | September 11, 2005 | Kitt Peak | Spacewatch | NYS | 1.0 km | MPC · JPL |
| 513118 | 2017 WJ_{27} | — | January 10, 2010 | Mount Lemmon | Mount Lemmon Survey | KON | 2.8 km | MPC · JPL |
| 513119 | 2017 WK_{27} | — | November 10, 2004 | Kitt Peak | Spacewatch | · | 1.7 km | MPC · JPL |
| 513120 | 2017 WL_{27} | — | January 28, 2015 | Haleakala | Pan-STARRS 1 | EUN | 1.0 km | MPC · JPL |
| 513121 | 2017 WR_{27} | — | September 26, 2000 | Socorro | LINEAR | · | 1.2 km | MPC · JPL |
| 513122 | 2017 WU_{27} | — | September 17, 2006 | Socorro | LINEAR | · | 750 m | MPC · JPL |
| 513123 | 1996 CG_{6} | — | February 10, 1996 | Kitt Peak | Spacewatch | · | 2.3 km | MPC · JPL |
| 513124 | 1996 JJ_{3} | — | May 9, 1996 | Kitt Peak | Spacewatch | · | 1.5 km | MPC · JPL |
| 513125 | 1997 GC_{32} | — | April 14, 1997 | Socorro | LINEAR | APO | 770 m | MPC · JPL |
| 513126 | 1998 QP | — | August 17, 1998 | Socorro | LINEAR | APO · PHA | 160 m | MPC · JPL |
| 513127 | 1998 VR_{2} | — | November 10, 1998 | Caussols | ODAS | · | 2.1 km | MPC · JPL |
| 513128 | 1999 UJ_{32} | — | October 31, 1999 | Kitt Peak | Spacewatch | · | 1.5 km | MPC · JPL |
| 513129 | 1999 UD_{41} | — | October 9, 1999 | Socorro | LINEAR | · | 1.4 km | MPC · JPL |
| 513130 | 2000 BH_{33} | — | January 30, 2000 | Kitt Peak | Spacewatch | · | 910 m | MPC · JPL |
| 513131 | 2000 SJ_{11} | — | September 1, 2000 | Socorro | LINEAR | H | 590 m | MPC · JPL |
| 513132 | 2000 SH_{136} | — | September 2, 2000 | Anderson Mesa | LONEOS | · | 620 m | MPC · JPL |
| 513133 | 2000 SV_{248} | — | August 31, 2000 | Socorro | LINEAR | · | 2.4 km | MPC · JPL |
| 513134 | 2000 TF_{1} | — | October 1, 2000 | Socorro | LINEAR | · | 1.8 km | MPC · JPL |
| 513135 | 2001 BF_{21} | — | January 19, 2001 | Socorro | LINEAR | · | 1.5 km | MPC · JPL |
| 513136 | 2001 FA_{65} | — | March 19, 2001 | Socorro | LINEAR | · | 1.4 km | MPC · JPL |
| 513137 | 2001 RF_{42} | — | September 11, 2001 | Socorro | LINEAR | · | 2.3 km | MPC · JPL |
| 513138 | 2002 CY_{58} | — | February 12, 2002 | Socorro | LINEAR | APO | 220 m | MPC · JPL |
| 513139 | 2002 CM_{274} | — | February 8, 2002 | Kitt Peak | Spacewatch | · | 1.5 km | MPC · JPL |
| 513140 | 2002 EQ_{4} | — | February 20, 2002 | Kitt Peak | Spacewatch | · | 2.6 km | MPC · JPL |
| 513141 | 2002 EH_{13} | — | March 4, 2002 | Socorro | LINEAR | · | 2.9 km | MPC · JPL |
| 513142 | 2002 PM_{168} | — | August 8, 2002 | Palomar | NEAT | · | 1.8 km | MPC · JPL |
| 513143 | 2002 RM_{179} | — | September 14, 2002 | Kitt Peak | Spacewatch | HOF | 2.1 km | MPC · JPL |
| 513144 | 2002 TU_{337} | — | October 5, 2002 | Apache Point | SDSS | · | 1.9 km | MPC · JPL |
| 513145 | 2002 XY_{69} | — | December 13, 2002 | Socorro | LINEAR | · | 970 m | MPC · JPL |
| 513146 | 2003 BZ_{70} | — | January 31, 2003 | Kitt Peak | Spacewatch | · | 1.0 km | MPC · JPL |
| 513147 | 2003 EL_{16} | — | March 8, 2003 | Socorro | LINEAR | H | 600 m | MPC · JPL |
| 513148 | 2003 GW_{37} | — | April 7, 2003 | Kvistaberg | Uppsala-DLR Asteroid Survey | · | 1.8 km | MPC · JPL |
| 513149 | 2003 KO_{8} | — | May 2, 2003 | Kitt Peak | Spacewatch | · | 1.1 km | MPC · JPL |
| 513150 | 2003 OV_{7} | — | July 25, 2003 | Palomar | NEAT | · | 1.3 km | MPC · JPL |
| 513151 | 2003 QL_{37} | — | August 22, 2003 | Socorro | LINEAR | · | 1.6 km | MPC · JPL |
| 513152 | 2003 QA_{104} | — | August 26, 2003 | Socorro | LINEAR | · | 1.8 km | MPC · JPL |
| 513153 | 2003 SF_{42} | — | September 16, 2003 | Socorro | LINEAR | H | 650 m | MPC · JPL |
| 513154 | 2003 SQ_{60} | — | August 25, 2003 | Socorro | LINEAR | · | 1.8 km | MPC · JPL |
| 513155 | 2003 SG_{115} | — | September 16, 2003 | Kitt Peak | Spacewatch | · | 1.7 km | MPC · JPL |
| 513156 | 2003 SF_{314} | — | September 18, 2003 | Palomar | NEAT | CYB | 2.6 km | MPC · JPL |
| 513157 | 2003 SU_{401} | — | September 26, 2003 | Apache Point | SDSS | · | 1.6 km | MPC · JPL |
| 513158 | 2003 UP_{8} | — | September 30, 2003 | Kitt Peak | Spacewatch | · | 1.6 km | MPC · JPL |
| 513159 | 2003 UC_{297} | — | October 1, 2003 | Anderson Mesa | LONEOS | JUN | 880 m | MPC · JPL |
| 513160 | 2003 UR_{321} | — | September 19, 2003 | Kitt Peak | Spacewatch | · | 1.3 km | MPC · JPL |
| 513161 | 2003 WX_{194} | — | November 16, 2003 | Kitt Peak | Spacewatch | · | 550 m | MPC · JPL |
| 513162 | 2003 YD_{15} | — | November 23, 2003 | Socorro | LINEAR | · | 1.3 km | MPC · JPL |
| 513163 | 2003 YT_{124} | — | December 28, 2003 | Socorro | LINEAR | AMO | 250 m | MPC · JPL |
| 513164 | 2004 BY_{163} | — | June 24, 2009 | Cerro Burek | J. L. Ortiz, I. de la Cueva | L5 | 8.9 km | MPC · JPL |
| 513165 | 2004 CK_{39} | — | February 14, 2004 | Catalina | CSS | T_{j} (2.99) · APO | 560 m | MPC · JPL |
| 513166 | 2004 DY_{38} | — | February 22, 2004 | Kitt Peak | Spacewatch | · | 680 m | MPC · JPL |
| 513167 | 2004 EV_{23} | — | March 15, 2004 | Catalina | CSS | PHO | 710 m | MPC · JPL |
| 513168 | 2004 EA_{42} | — | February 19, 2004 | Socorro | LINEAR | PHO | 890 m | MPC · JPL |
| 513169 | 2004 EY_{78} | — | March 15, 2004 | Kitt Peak | Spacewatch | NYS | 940 m | MPC · JPL |
| 513170 | 2004 KH_{15} | — | May 24, 2004 | Socorro | LINEAR | ATE | 330 m | MPC · JPL |
| 513171 | 2004 MD_{6} | — | June 23, 2004 | Socorro | LINEAR | ATE · PHA | 280 m | MPC · JPL |
| 513172 | 2004 RC_{61} | — | September 8, 2004 | Socorro | LINEAR | T_{j} (2.91) · CYB | 4.1 km | MPC · JPL |
| 513173 | 2004 RQ_{110} | — | September 11, 2004 | Socorro | LINEAR | · | 1.0 km | MPC · JPL |
| 513174 | 2004 RF_{239} | — | September 10, 2004 | Kitt Peak | Spacewatch | · | 2.4 km | MPC · JPL |
| 513175 | 2004 RW_{246} | — | September 11, 2004 | Socorro | LINEAR | EUP | 3.4 km | MPC · JPL |
| 513176 | 2004 TU_{24} | — | October 4, 2004 | Kitt Peak | Spacewatch | · | 3.5 km | MPC · JPL |
| 513177 | 2004 TX_{159} | — | October 6, 2004 | Kitt Peak | Spacewatch | · | 1.1 km | MPC · JPL |
| 513178 | 2004 XU_{6} | — | December 2, 2004 | Socorro | LINEAR | · | 1.0 km | MPC · JPL |
| 513179 | 2004 XT_{130} | — | December 14, 2004 | Catalina | CSS | · | 1.6 km | MPC · JPL |
| 513180 | 2004 XU_{146} | — | December 15, 2004 | Campo Imperatore | CINEOS | BAR | 1.3 km | MPC · JPL |
| 513181 | 2005 BS_{27} | — | January 31, 2005 | Socorro | LINEAR | APO | 300 m | MPC · JPL |
| 513182 | 2005 CV_{38} | — | February 9, 2005 | Socorro | LINEAR | AMO | 300 m | MPC · JPL |
| 513183 | 2005 EK_{16} | — | February 10, 1996 | Kitt Peak | Spacewatch | · | 1.3 km | MPC · JPL |
| 513184 | 2005 EB_{134} | — | March 9, 2005 | Kitt Peak | Spacewatch | · | 1.4 km | MPC · JPL |
| 513185 | 2005 EF_{260} | — | March 11, 2005 | Kitt Peak | Spacewatch | · | 660 m | MPC · JPL |
| 513186 | 2005 GD_{14} | — | April 2, 2005 | Kitt Peak | Spacewatch | · | 1.1 km | MPC · JPL |
| 513187 | 2005 GJ_{32} | — | April 4, 2005 | Mount Lemmon | Mount Lemmon Survey | · | 430 m | MPC · JPL |
| 513188 | 2005 GQ_{38} | — | April 4, 2005 | Kitt Peak | Spacewatch | · | 650 m | MPC · JPL |
| 513189 | 2005 GD_{45} | — | April 5, 2005 | Anderson Mesa | LONEOS | · | 1.7 km | MPC · JPL |
| 513190 | 2005 GP_{45} | — | April 5, 2005 | Palomar | NEAT | · | 1.3 km | MPC · JPL |
| 513191 | 2005 GO_{95} | — | April 6, 2005 | Kitt Peak | Spacewatch | · | 550 m | MPC · JPL |
| 513192 | 2005 HQ_{2} | — | April 7, 2005 | Kitt Peak | Spacewatch | · | 480 m | MPC · JPL |
| 513193 | 2005 JZ_{116} | — | May 10, 2005 | Socorro | LINEAR | H | 700 m | MPC · JPL |
| 513194 | 2005 NS_{35} | — | July 5, 2005 | Kitt Peak | Spacewatch | · | 1.9 km | MPC · JPL |
| 513195 | 2005 NW_{43} | — | June 14, 2005 | Mount Lemmon | Mount Lemmon Survey | V | 530 m | MPC · JPL |
| 513196 | 2005 QS_{115} | — | August 28, 2005 | Kitt Peak | Spacewatch | H | 480 m | MPC · JPL |
| 513197 | 2005 QE_{136} | — | August 28, 2005 | Kitt Peak | Spacewatch | · | 1.0 km | MPC · JPL |
| 513198 | 2005 RZ_{45} | — | September 14, 2005 | Apache Point | A. C. Becker | · | 1.0 km | MPC · JPL |
| 513199 | 2005 SJ_{13} | — | September 24, 2005 | Kitt Peak | Spacewatch | · | 2.0 km | MPC · JPL |
| 513200 | 2005 SH_{27} | — | September 23, 2005 | Kitt Peak | Spacewatch | · | 820 m | MPC · JPL |

== 513201–513300 ==
back to top

| Designation | | | Discovery | | | Properties | | Ref |
| Permanent | Provisional | Named after | Date | Site | Discoverer(s) | Category | Diam. | Ref |
|---|---|---|---|---|---|---|---|---|
| 513201 | 2005 SX_{33} | — | September 23, 2005 | Kitt Peak | Spacewatch | · | 1.2 km | MPC · JPL |
| 513202 | 2005 SH_{157} | — | September 26, 2005 | Kitt Peak | Spacewatch | EOS | 1.4 km | MPC · JPL |
| 513203 | 2005 SF_{188} | — | September 29, 2005 | Mount Lemmon | Mount Lemmon Survey | NYS | 1.0 km | MPC · JPL |
| 513204 | 2005 TC_{2} | — | October 1, 2005 | Kitt Peak | Spacewatch | · | 1.2 km | MPC · JPL |
| 513205 | 2005 TO_{41} | — | September 23, 2005 | Kitt Peak | Spacewatch | · | 3.0 km | MPC · JPL |
| 513206 | 2005 TF_{79} | — | October 7, 2005 | Kitt Peak | Spacewatch | · | 820 m | MPC · JPL |
| 513207 | 2005 TH_{82} | — | October 3, 2005 | Kitt Peak | Spacewatch | EOS | 1.4 km | MPC · JPL |
| 513208 | 2005 TH_{136} | — | October 6, 2005 | Kitt Peak | Spacewatch | MAS | 570 m | MPC · JPL |
| 513209 | 2005 UB_{40} | — | October 24, 2005 | Kitt Peak | Spacewatch | THM | 1.9 km | MPC · JPL |
| 513210 | 2005 UV_{47} | — | October 7, 2005 | Catalina | CSS | TIR | 2.8 km | MPC · JPL |
| 513211 | 2005 UX_{55} | — | October 23, 2005 | Kitt Peak | Spacewatch | THM | 1.8 km | MPC · JPL |
| 513212 | 2005 UU_{94} | — | October 22, 2005 | Kitt Peak | Spacewatch | · | 790 m | MPC · JPL |
| 513213 | 2005 UJ_{118} | — | October 24, 2005 | Kitt Peak | Spacewatch | · | 2.1 km | MPC · JPL |
| 513214 | 2005 US_{202} | — | October 25, 2005 | Kitt Peak | Spacewatch | EOS | 1.6 km | MPC · JPL |
| 513215 | 2005 UD_{228} | — | October 25, 2005 | Kitt Peak | Spacewatch | · | 950 m | MPC · JPL |
| 513216 | 2005 UP_{246} | — | October 27, 2005 | Kitt Peak | Spacewatch | THM | 2.2 km | MPC · JPL |
| 513217 | 2005 UX_{248} | — | October 28, 2005 | Mount Lemmon | Mount Lemmon Survey | MAS | 580 m | MPC · JPL |
| 513218 | 2005 UU_{255} | — | October 24, 2005 | Kitt Peak | Spacewatch | · | 1 km | MPC · JPL |
| 513219 | 2005 UW_{267} | — | October 27, 2005 | Kitt Peak | Spacewatch | NYS | 920 m | MPC · JPL |
| 513220 | 2005 UG_{280} | — | October 24, 2005 | Kitt Peak | Spacewatch | · | 2.2 km | MPC · JPL |
| 513221 | 2005 UD_{306} | — | October 12, 2005 | Kitt Peak | Spacewatch | MAS | 530 m | MPC · JPL |
| 513222 | 2005 UJ_{319} | — | October 27, 2005 | Kitt Peak | Spacewatch | · | 2.4 km | MPC · JPL |
| 513223 | 2005 UR_{370} | — | October 27, 2005 | Kitt Peak | Spacewatch | · | 970 m | MPC · JPL |
| 513224 | 2005 UA_{394} | — | October 29, 2005 | Mount Lemmon | Mount Lemmon Survey | · | 850 m | MPC · JPL |
| 513225 | 2005 UR_{395} | — | October 30, 2005 | Mount Lemmon | Mount Lemmon Survey | LIX | 3.6 km | MPC · JPL |
| 513226 | 2005 UO_{397} | — | October 7, 2005 | Catalina | CSS | NYS | 1.2 km | MPC · JPL |
| 513227 | 2005 UK_{524} | — | October 27, 2005 | Apache Point | A. C. Becker | · | 2.0 km | MPC · JPL |
| 513228 | 2005 VO_{10} | — | November 2, 2005 | Mount Lemmon | Mount Lemmon Survey | · | 2.3 km | MPC · JPL |
| 513229 | 2005 VJ_{42} | — | November 3, 2005 | Catalina | CSS | TIR | 3.3 km | MPC · JPL |
| 513230 | 2005 VT_{53} | — | October 22, 2005 | Kitt Peak | Spacewatch | · | 1.0 km | MPC · JPL |
| 513231 | 2005 VU_{70} | — | November 1, 2005 | Mount Lemmon | Mount Lemmon Survey | EOS | 2.2 km | MPC · JPL |
| 513232 | 2005 VT_{124} | — | November 3, 2005 | Kitt Peak | Spacewatch | · | 730 m | MPC · JPL |
| 513233 | 2005 WE_{2} | — | November 22, 2005 | Catalina | CSS | · | 530 m | MPC · JPL |
| 513234 | 2005 WC_{56} | — | November 25, 2005 | Mount Lemmon | Mount Lemmon Survey | · | 930 m | MPC · JPL |
| 513235 | 2005 WD_{66} | — | November 22, 2005 | Kitt Peak | Spacewatch | · | 1.9 km | MPC · JPL |
| 513236 | 2005 WA_{132} | — | November 25, 2005 | Mount Lemmon | Mount Lemmon Survey | · | 890 m | MPC · JPL |
| 513237 | 2005 WG_{168} | — | November 30, 2005 | Kitt Peak | Spacewatch | · | 850 m | MPC · JPL |
| 513238 | 2005 WV_{191} | — | November 25, 2005 | Catalina | CSS | · | 3.1 km | MPC · JPL |
| 513239 | 2005 XO_{24} | — | December 2, 2005 | Mount Lemmon | Mount Lemmon Survey | · | 2.7 km | MPC · JPL |
| 513240 | 2005 YY_{160} | — | December 27, 2005 | Kitt Peak | Spacewatch | VER | 2.3 km | MPC · JPL |
| 513241 | 2006 AE_{37} | — | January 4, 2006 | Kitt Peak | Spacewatch | · | 2.3 km | MPC · JPL |
| 513242 | 2006 AL_{39} | — | December 29, 2005 | Kitt Peak | Spacewatch | · | 2.5 km | MPC · JPL |
| 513243 | 2006 AT_{75} | — | January 4, 2006 | Kitt Peak | Spacewatch | · | 1.1 km | MPC · JPL |
| 513244 | 2006 BU_{11} | — | January 21, 2006 | Kitt Peak | Spacewatch | · | 3.5 km | MPC · JPL |
| 513245 | 2006 BW_{40} | — | January 21, 2006 | Mount Lemmon | Mount Lemmon Survey | · | 1.3 km | MPC · JPL |
| 513246 | 2006 CB_{11} | — | December 30, 2005 | Mount Lemmon | Mount Lemmon Survey | · | 2.2 km | MPC · JPL |
| 513247 | 2006 DA_{29} | — | February 20, 2006 | Kitt Peak | Spacewatch | · | 1.3 km | MPC · JPL |
| 513248 | 2006 DJ_{88} | — | February 24, 2006 | Kitt Peak | Spacewatch | BRG | 1.1 km | MPC · JPL |
| 513249 | 2006 DG_{124} | — | February 24, 2006 | Mount Lemmon | Mount Lemmon Survey | · | 940 m | MPC · JPL |
| 513250 | 2006 DW_{209} | — | February 20, 2006 | Kitt Peak | Spacewatch | · | 980 m | MPC · JPL |
| 513251 | 2006 ER_{26} | — | January 30, 2006 | Kitt Peak | Spacewatch | L5 | 7.2 km | MPC · JPL |
| 513252 | 2006 ET_{48} | — | January 28, 2006 | Kitt Peak | Spacewatch | · | 1.4 km | MPC · JPL |
| 513253 | 2006 EK_{71} | — | January 25, 2006 | Kitt Peak | Spacewatch | L5 | 10 km | MPC · JPL |
| 513254 | 2006 HV_{67} | — | April 24, 2006 | Mount Lemmon | Mount Lemmon Survey | · | 1.6 km | MPC · JPL |
| 513255 | 2006 HO_{68} | — | April 24, 2006 | Kitt Peak | Spacewatch | · | 1.7 km | MPC · JPL |
| 513256 | 2006 HH_{80} | — | April 26, 2006 | Kitt Peak | Spacewatch | · | 1.4 km | MPC · JPL |
| 513257 | 2006 HZ_{91} | — | April 29, 2006 | Kitt Peak | Spacewatch | · | 1.3 km | MPC · JPL |
| 513258 | 2006 JS_{49} | — | April 19, 2006 | Kitt Peak | Spacewatch | · | 990 m | MPC · JPL |
| 513259 | 2006 PR_{11} | — | August 13, 2006 | Palomar | NEAT | JUN | 990 m | MPC · JPL |
| 513260 | 2006 RT_{77} | — | September 15, 2006 | Kitt Peak | Spacewatch | H | 390 m | MPC · JPL |
| 513261 | 2006 RP_{108} | — | September 14, 2006 | Mauna Kea | Masiero, J. | · | 500 m | MPC · JPL |
| 513262 | 2006 SE_{18} | — | August 29, 2006 | Kitt Peak | Spacewatch | · | 550 m | MPC · JPL |
| 513263 | 2006 SP_{44} | — | September 17, 2006 | Anderson Mesa | LONEOS | · | 2.3 km | MPC · JPL |
| 513264 | 2006 SA_{75} | — | September 19, 2006 | Kitt Peak | Spacewatch | V | 490 m | MPC · JPL |
| 513265 | 2006 SE_{121} | — | September 18, 2006 | Catalina | CSS | H | 610 m | MPC · JPL |
| 513266 | 2006 SE_{194} | — | September 17, 2006 | Kitt Peak | Spacewatch | · | 1.5 km | MPC · JPL |
| 513267 | 2006 SP_{249} | — | September 19, 2006 | Kitt Peak | Spacewatch | · | 890 m | MPC · JPL |
| 513268 | 2006 SJ_{294} | — | September 17, 2006 | Kitt Peak | Spacewatch | · | 560 m | MPC · JPL |
| 513269 | 2006 ST_{337} | — | September 28, 2006 | Kitt Peak | Spacewatch | · | 2.3 km | MPC · JPL |
| 513270 | 2006 SW_{346} | — | July 22, 2006 | Mount Lemmon | Mount Lemmon Survey | PHO | 1.2 km | MPC · JPL |
| 513271 | 2006 SL_{358} | — | August 19, 2006 | Kitt Peak | Spacewatch | · | 540 m | MPC · JPL |
| 513272 | 2006 TH_{25} | — | October 12, 2006 | Kitt Peak | Spacewatch | NYS | 570 m | MPC · JPL |
| 513273 | 2006 TJ_{43} | — | September 27, 2006 | Mount Lemmon | Mount Lemmon Survey | · | 520 m | MPC · JPL |
| 513274 | 2006 UL_{15} | — | October 2, 2006 | Mount Lemmon | Mount Lemmon Survey | · | 630 m | MPC · JPL |
| 513275 | 2006 UH_{40} | — | October 16, 2006 | Kitt Peak | Spacewatch | · | 490 m | MPC · JPL |
| 513276 | 2006 UM_{209} | — | September 30, 2006 | Mount Lemmon | Mount Lemmon Survey | · | 1.4 km | MPC · JPL |
| 513277 | 2006 VY_{15} | — | October 21, 2006 | Kitt Peak | Spacewatch | · | 620 m | MPC · JPL |
| 513278 | 2006 VG_{136} | — | October 27, 2006 | Mount Lemmon | Mount Lemmon Survey | · | 670 m | MPC · JPL |
| 513279 | 2006 VU_{150} | — | October 4, 2006 | Mount Lemmon | Mount Lemmon Survey | · | 660 m | MPC · JPL |
| 513280 | 2006 VC_{172} | — | November 11, 2006 | Mount Lemmon | Mount Lemmon Survey | · | 1.7 km | MPC · JPL |
| 513281 | 2006 WO_{84} | — | October 18, 2006 | Kitt Peak | Spacewatch | · | 1.8 km | MPC · JPL |
| 513282 | 2006 WG_{156} | — | November 15, 2006 | Mount Lemmon | Mount Lemmon Survey | H | 530 m | MPC · JPL |
| 513283 | 2006 WY_{185} | — | October 23, 2006 | Catalina | CSS | · | 1.8 km | MPC · JPL |
| 513284 | 2006 WS_{207} | — | November 18, 2006 | Mount Lemmon | Mount Lemmon Survey | · | 1.7 km | MPC · JPL |
| 513285 | 2006 WT_{207} | — | November 18, 2006 | Mount Lemmon | Mount Lemmon Survey | · | 2.6 km | MPC · JPL |
| 513286 | 2006 XG_{12} | — | December 1, 2006 | Socorro | LINEAR | H | 680 m | MPC · JPL |
| 513287 | 2006 XU_{47} | — | December 13, 2006 | Kitt Peak | Spacewatch | · | 770 m | MPC · JPL |
| 513288 | 2006 YM_{46} | — | December 21, 2006 | Mount Lemmon | Mount Lemmon Survey | · | 2.8 km | MPC · JPL |
| 513289 | 2007 AC_{15} | — | December 13, 2006 | Kitt Peak | Spacewatch | · | 2.7 km | MPC · JPL |
| 513290 | 2007 AT_{31} | — | December 13, 2006 | Mount Lemmon | Mount Lemmon Survey | · | 1.1 km | MPC · JPL |
| 513291 | 2007 BW_{16} | — | December 21, 2006 | Kitt Peak | Spacewatch | · | 2.0 km | MPC · JPL |
| 513292 | 2007 BA_{51} | — | November 28, 2006 | Mount Lemmon | Mount Lemmon Survey | ERI | 1.1 km | MPC · JPL |
| 513293 | 2007 BJ_{61} | — | December 24, 2006 | Kitt Peak | Spacewatch | · | 820 m | MPC · JPL |
| 513294 | 2007 BA_{63} | — | January 27, 2007 | Mount Lemmon | Mount Lemmon Survey | · | 2.5 km | MPC · JPL |
| 513295 | 2007 BD_{63} | — | January 27, 2007 | Mount Lemmon | Mount Lemmon Survey | · | 2.3 km | MPC · JPL |
| 513296 | 2007 BN_{68} | — | January 27, 2007 | Mount Lemmon | Mount Lemmon Survey | · | 1.2 km | MPC · JPL |
| 513297 | 2007 BF_{71} | — | January 28, 2007 | Mount Lemmon | Mount Lemmon Survey | · | 1.0 km | MPC · JPL |
| 513298 | 2007 BR_{78} | — | January 26, 2007 | Kitt Peak | Spacewatch | · | 3.8 km | MPC · JPL |
| 513299 | 2007 BW_{79} | — | January 27, 2007 | Kitt Peak | Spacewatch | EOS | 1.8 km | MPC · JPL |
| 513300 | 2007 CN_{3} | — | February 6, 2007 | Kitt Peak | Spacewatch | · | 2.8 km | MPC · JPL |

== 513301–513400 ==
back to top

| Designation | | | Discovery | | | Properties | | Ref |
| Permanent | Provisional | Named after | Date | Site | Discoverer(s) | Category | Diam. | Ref |
|---|---|---|---|---|---|---|---|---|
| 513301 | 2007 CV_{3} | — | February 6, 2007 | Kitt Peak | Spacewatch | NYS | 890 m | MPC · JPL |
| 513302 | 2007 CD_{5} | — | February 6, 2007 | Kitt Peak | Spacewatch | · | 1.1 km | MPC · JPL |
| 513303 | 2007 CN_{8} | — | December 24, 2006 | Kitt Peak | Spacewatch | THM | 1.7 km | MPC · JPL |
| 513304 | 2007 CA_{10} | — | February 6, 2007 | Mount Lemmon | Mount Lemmon Survey | · | 1.9 km | MPC · JPL |
| 513305 | 2007 CV_{10} | — | January 17, 2007 | Kitt Peak | Spacewatch | · | 2.1 km | MPC · JPL |
| 513306 | 2007 CW_{20} | — | January 27, 2007 | Mount Lemmon | Mount Lemmon Survey | MAS | 570 m | MPC · JPL |
| 513307 | 2007 CA_{66} | — | February 8, 2007 | Kitt Peak | Spacewatch | · | 2.1 km | MPC · JPL |
| 513308 | 2007 DX_{10} | — | February 9, 2007 | Kitt Peak | Spacewatch | · | 3.0 km | MPC · JPL |
| 513309 | 2007 DV_{15} | — | February 17, 2007 | Kitt Peak | Spacewatch | TIR | 2.4 km | MPC · JPL |
| 513310 | 2007 DJ_{33} | — | December 27, 2006 | Mount Lemmon | Mount Lemmon Survey | · | 1.1 km | MPC · JPL |
| 513311 | 2007 DZ_{35} | — | February 17, 2007 | Kitt Peak | Spacewatch | NYS | 910 m | MPC · JPL |
| 513312 | 2007 DM_{41} | — | February 23, 2007 | Catalina | CSS | APO · PHA | 140 m | MPC · JPL |
| 513313 | 2007 DX_{47} | — | February 21, 2007 | Mount Lemmon | Mount Lemmon Survey | · | 3.0 km | MPC · JPL |
| 513314 | 2007 DM_{50} | — | December 21, 2006 | Mount Lemmon | Mount Lemmon Survey | · | 920 m | MPC · JPL |
| 513315 | 2007 DK_{72} | — | February 21, 2007 | Kitt Peak | Spacewatch | · | 960 m | MPC · JPL |
| 513316 | 2007 DH_{113} | — | February 21, 2007 | Kitt Peak | Spacewatch | T_{j} (2.95) | 3.5 km | MPC · JPL |
| 513317 | 2007 DJ_{113} | — | February 21, 2007 | Kitt Peak | Spacewatch | T_{j} (2.98) | 3.3 km | MPC · JPL |
| 513318 | 2007 EB_{2} | — | February 25, 2007 | Kitt Peak | Spacewatch | · | 2.7 km | MPC · JPL |
| 513319 | 2007 EF_{2} | — | March 9, 2007 | Kitt Peak | Spacewatch | · | 2.4 km | MPC · JPL |
| 513320 | 2007 EJ_{4} | — | February 13, 2007 | Mount Lemmon | Mount Lemmon Survey | · | 770 m | MPC · JPL |
| 513321 | 2007 EJ_{19} | — | February 21, 2007 | Kitt Peak | Spacewatch | · | 2.4 km | MPC · JPL |
| 513322 | 2007 EV_{42} | — | February 25, 2007 | Mount Lemmon | Mount Lemmon Survey | · | 3.4 km | MPC · JPL |
| 513323 | 2007 EN_{48} | — | March 9, 2007 | Kitt Peak | Spacewatch | THB | 3.1 km | MPC · JPL |
| 513324 | 2007 EA_{55} | — | March 12, 2007 | Mount Lemmon | Mount Lemmon Survey | NYS | 770 m | MPC · JPL |
| 513325 | 2007 EY_{135} | — | February 21, 2007 | Kitt Peak | Spacewatch | MAS | 610 m | MPC · JPL |
| 513326 | 2007 EP_{210} | — | February 22, 2007 | Kitt Peak | Spacewatch | · | 1.1 km | MPC · JPL |
| 513327 | 2007 EA_{211} | — | February 17, 2007 | Kitt Peak | Spacewatch | · | 1.0 km | MPC · JPL |
| 513328 | 2007 FH_{21} | — | February 21, 2007 | Mount Lemmon | Mount Lemmon Survey | · | 3.1 km | MPC · JPL |
| 513329 | 2007 FB_{24} | — | March 9, 2007 | Kitt Peak | Spacewatch | · | 1.2 km | MPC · JPL |
| 513330 | 2007 FL_{40} | — | March 9, 2007 | Kitt Peak | Spacewatch | · | 1 km | MPC · JPL |
| 513331 | 2007 GG_{41} | — | March 15, 2007 | Mount Lemmon | Mount Lemmon Survey | · | 940 m | MPC · JPL |
| 513332 | 2007 GV_{58} | — | March 18, 2007 | Catalina | CSS | LIX | 3.6 km | MPC · JPL |
| 513333 | 2007 HL_{16} | — | March 16, 2007 | Catalina | CSS | · | 3.2 km | MPC · JPL |
| 513334 | 2007 HX_{39} | — | April 20, 2007 | Mount Lemmon | Mount Lemmon Survey | · | 1.0 km | MPC · JPL |
| 513335 | 2007 HF_{75} | — | April 22, 2007 | Kitt Peak | Spacewatch | MAS | 630 m | MPC · JPL |
| 513336 | 2007 HJ_{94} | — | April 23, 2007 | Mount Graham | Mount Graham | MAS | 590 m | MPC · JPL |
| 513337 | 2007 LH_{1} | — | May 10, 2007 | Kitt Peak | Spacewatch | · | 3.0 km | MPC · JPL |
| 513338 | 2007 ME_{1} | — | June 16, 2007 | Kitt Peak | Spacewatch | · | 1.0 km | MPC · JPL |
| 513339 | 2007 PT_{14} | — | August 8, 2007 | Socorro | LINEAR | · | 1.5 km | MPC · JPL |
| 513340 Xianshiyou | 2007 PC_{49} | Xianshiyou | August 13, 2007 | XuYi | PMO NEO Survey Program | · | 1.4 km | MPC · JPL |
| 513341 | 2007 QJ_{4} | — | August 23, 2007 | Kitt Peak | Spacewatch | · | 1.9 km | MPC · JPL |
| 513342 | 2007 QA_{8} | — | August 22, 2007 | Socorro | LINEAR | BAR | 1.3 km | MPC · JPL |
| 513343 | 2007 RN_{36} | — | September 8, 2007 | Anderson Mesa | LONEOS | · | 580 m | MPC · JPL |
| 513344 | 2007 RT_{218} | — | September 14, 2007 | Mount Lemmon | Mount Lemmon Survey | · | 1.3 km | MPC · JPL |
| 513345 | 2007 RS_{249} | — | September 5, 2007 | Anderson Mesa | LONEOS | · | 1.6 km | MPC · JPL |
| 513346 | 2007 RV_{319} | — | September 13, 2007 | Catalina | CSS | · | 1.4 km | MPC · JPL |
| 513347 | 2007 TQ_{428} | — | October 11, 2007 | Catalina | CSS | · | 1.9 km | MPC · JPL |
| 513348 | 2007 TG_{455} | — | October 12, 2007 | Mount Lemmon | Mount Lemmon Survey | · | 1.6 km | MPC · JPL |
| 513349 | 2007 VM_{43} | — | October 20, 2007 | Kitt Peak | Spacewatch | · | 1.7 km | MPC · JPL |
| 513350 | 2007 VX_{123} | — | November 5, 2007 | Kitt Peak | Spacewatch | · | 540 m | MPC · JPL |
| 513351 | 2007 VG_{203} | — | November 8, 2007 | Mount Lemmon | Mount Lemmon Survey | AGN | 950 m | MPC · JPL |
| 513352 | 2007 VV_{337} | — | September 16, 2006 | Kitt Peak | Spacewatch | 3:2 | 4.9 km | MPC · JPL |
| 513353 | 2007 WZ_{45} | — | November 9, 2007 | Mount Lemmon | Mount Lemmon Survey | · | 1.6 km | MPC · JPL |
| 513354 | 2007 YQ_{13} | — | December 17, 2007 | Mount Lemmon | Mount Lemmon Survey | · | 650 m | MPC · JPL |
| 513355 | 2008 AA_{7} | — | November 6, 2007 | Kitt Peak | Spacewatch | · | 2.3 km | MPC · JPL |
| 513356 | 2008 AE_{61} | — | January 11, 2008 | Kitt Peak | Spacewatch | H | 330 m | MPC · JPL |
| 513357 | 2008 AN_{64} | — | January 11, 2008 | Mount Lemmon | Mount Lemmon Survey | · | 480 m | MPC · JPL |
| 513358 | 2008 CA_{5} | — | February 6, 2008 | Catalina | CSS | APO | 390 m | MPC · JPL |
| 513359 | 2008 CO_{109} | — | February 9, 2008 | Kitt Peak | Spacewatch | H | 410 m | MPC · JPL |
| 513360 | 2008 CD_{157} | — | January 10, 2008 | Mount Lemmon | Mount Lemmon Survey | · | 1.4 km | MPC · JPL |
| 513361 | 2008 CX_{182} | — | February 11, 2008 | Mount Lemmon | Mount Lemmon Survey | PHO | 1.0 km | MPC · JPL |
| 513362 | 2008 CX_{203} | — | February 13, 2008 | Kitt Peak | Spacewatch | · | 500 m | MPC · JPL |
| 513363 | 2008 DT_{5} | — | January 11, 2008 | Catalina | CSS | PHO | 1.0 km | MPC · JPL |
| 513364 | 2008 DJ_{12} | — | February 26, 2008 | Kitt Peak | Spacewatch | · | 620 m | MPC · JPL |
| 513365 | 2008 DT_{52} | — | February 29, 2008 | Mount Lemmon | Mount Lemmon Survey | · | 580 m | MPC · JPL |
| 513366 | 2008 DX_{65} | — | February 28, 2008 | Mount Lemmon | Mount Lemmon Survey | · | 830 m | MPC · JPL |
| 513367 | 2008 DF_{77} | — | February 8, 2008 | Kitt Peak | Spacewatch | · | 450 m | MPC · JPL |
| 513368 | 2008 DW_{80} | — | February 24, 2008 | Kitt Peak | Spacewatch | · | 1.4 km | MPC · JPL |
| 513369 | 2008 DT_{88} | — | February 27, 2008 | Catalina | CSS | H | 490 m | MPC · JPL |
| 513370 | 2008 EU_{86} | — | March 7, 2008 | Kitt Peak | Spacewatch | KOR | 1.6 km | MPC · JPL |
| 513371 | 2008 ER_{116} | — | March 8, 2008 | Kitt Peak | Spacewatch | · | 1.3 km | MPC · JPL |
| 513372 | 2008 EA_{121} | — | February 13, 2008 | Mount Lemmon | Mount Lemmon Survey | · | 1.7 km | MPC · JPL |
| 513373 | 2008 EU_{121} | — | March 1, 2008 | Kitt Peak | Spacewatch | · | 530 m | MPC · JPL |
| 513374 | 2008 EQ_{137} | — | March 11, 2008 | Kitt Peak | Spacewatch | EOS | 1.5 km | MPC · JPL |
| 513375 | 2008 EX_{149} | — | March 5, 2008 | Kitt Peak | Spacewatch | · | 1.3 km | MPC · JPL |
| 513376 | 2008 EJ_{171} | — | March 15, 2008 | Mount Lemmon | Mount Lemmon Survey | · | 2.0 km | MPC · JPL |
| 513377 | 2008 FV_{62} | — | March 27, 2008 | Kitt Peak | Spacewatch | NAE | 1.7 km | MPC · JPL |
| 513378 | 2008 FS_{73} | — | March 30, 2008 | Kitt Peak | Spacewatch | · | 2.1 km | MPC · JPL |
| 513379 | 2008 FL_{137} | — | October 30, 2005 | Kitt Peak | Spacewatch | ARM | 2.7 km | MPC · JPL |
| 513380 | 2008 GL | — | March 2, 2008 | Kitt Peak | Spacewatch | · | 2.2 km | MPC · JPL |
| 513381 | 2008 GZ_{7} | — | October 7, 2004 | Anderson Mesa | LONEOS | · | 3.5 km | MPC · JPL |
| 513382 | 2008 GU_{27} | — | April 3, 2008 | Mount Lemmon | Mount Lemmon Survey | · | 1.2 km | MPC · JPL |
| 513383 | 2008 GH_{43} | — | April 4, 2008 | Mount Lemmon | Mount Lemmon Survey | EOS | 1.6 km | MPC · JPL |
| 513384 | 2008 GL_{70} | — | April 6, 2008 | Kitt Peak | Spacewatch | · | 670 m | MPC · JPL |
| 513385 | 2008 GR_{71} | — | April 7, 2008 | Kitt Peak | Spacewatch | H | 350 m | MPC · JPL |
| 513386 | 2008 GK_{131} | — | April 11, 2008 | Kitt Peak | Spacewatch | · | 2.0 km | MPC · JPL |
| 513387 | 2008 GY_{133} | — | April 4, 2008 | Kitt Peak | Spacewatch | L5 | 8.2 km | MPC · JPL |
| 513388 | 2008 HZ_{5} | — | March 29, 2008 | Mount Lemmon | Mount Lemmon Survey | · | 460 m | MPC · JPL |
| 513389 | 2008 HQ_{14} | — | April 12, 2008 | Mount Lemmon | Mount Lemmon Survey | · | 530 m | MPC · JPL |
| 513390 | 2008 HP_{22} | — | April 6, 2008 | Mount Lemmon | Mount Lemmon Survey | · | 490 m | MPC · JPL |
| 513391 | 2008 HP_{29} | — | April 11, 2008 | Mount Lemmon | Mount Lemmon Survey | · | 2.6 km | MPC · JPL |
| 513392 | 2008 HA_{58} | — | April 9, 2008 | Kitt Peak | Spacewatch | · | 2.3 km | MPC · JPL |
| 513393 | 2008 HB_{62} | — | March 15, 2008 | Mount Lemmon | Mount Lemmon Survey | · | 3.5 km | MPC · JPL |
| 513394 | 2008 HE_{69} | — | April 16, 2008 | Mount Lemmon | Mount Lemmon Survey | L5 | 7.5 km | MPC · JPL |
| 513395 | 2008 HF_{71} | — | September 24, 2014 | Mount Lemmon | Mount Lemmon Survey | L5 | 7.7 km | MPC · JPL |
| 513396 | 2008 JM_{4} | — | May 1, 2008 | Kitt Peak | Spacewatch | · | 600 m | MPC · JPL |
| 513397 | 2008 JV_{22} | — | May 7, 2008 | Kitt Peak | Spacewatch | · | 3.5 km | MPC · JPL |
| 513398 | 2008 KM_{10} | — | May 11, 2008 | Mount Lemmon | Mount Lemmon Survey | L5 | 8.3 km | MPC · JPL |
| 513399 | 2008 KE_{14} | — | May 14, 2008 | Kitt Peak | Spacewatch | URS | 2.6 km | MPC · JPL |
| 513400 | 2008 KS_{15} | — | May 27, 2008 | Kitt Peak | Spacewatch | · | 3.2 km | MPC · JPL |

== 513401–513500 ==
back to top

| Designation | | | Discovery | | | Properties | | Ref |
| Permanent | Provisional | Named after | Date | Site | Discoverer(s) | Category | Diam. | Ref |
|---|---|---|---|---|---|---|---|---|
| 513401 | 2008 KH_{23} | — | April 15, 2008 | Mount Lemmon | Mount Lemmon Survey | L5 | 9.7 km | MPC · JPL |
| 513402 | 2008 KH_{40} | — | April 13, 2008 | Mount Lemmon | Mount Lemmon Survey | · | 2.8 km | MPC · JPL |
| 513403 | 2008 KO_{43} | — | April 16, 2008 | Mount Lemmon | Mount Lemmon Survey | L5 | 10 km | MPC · JPL |
| 513404 | 2008 PR_{18} | — | August 5, 2008 | Siding Spring | SSS | PHO | 980 m | MPC · JPL |
| 513405 | 2008 RP_{7} | — | September 3, 2008 | Kitt Peak | Spacewatch | · | 1.4 km | MPC · JPL |
| 513406 | 2008 RB_{10} | — | September 3, 2008 | Kitt Peak | Spacewatch | MAR | 750 m | MPC · JPL |
| 513407 | 2008 RL_{10} | — | September 3, 2008 | Kitt Peak | Spacewatch | · | 820 m | MPC · JPL |
| 513408 | 2008 SK_{106} | — | September 21, 2008 | Kitt Peak | Spacewatch | · | 1.1 km | MPC · JPL |
| 513409 | 2008 SX_{117} | — | September 22, 2008 | Mount Lemmon | Mount Lemmon Survey | · | 950 m | MPC · JPL |
| 513410 | 2008 SQ_{132} | — | September 22, 2008 | Kitt Peak | Spacewatch | MAR | 760 m | MPC · JPL |
| 513411 | 2008 SK_{195} | — | September 25, 2008 | Kitt Peak | Spacewatch | · | 940 m | MPC · JPL |
| 513412 | 2008 SL_{235} | — | September 4, 2008 | Kitt Peak | Spacewatch | NYS | 1.0 km | MPC · JPL |
| 513413 | 2008 SU_{246} | — | September 23, 2008 | Kitt Peak | Spacewatch | EUN | 750 m | MPC · JPL |
| 513414 | 2008 SV_{267} | — | September 23, 2008 | Kitt Peak | Spacewatch | 3:2 · SHU | 4.1 km | MPC · JPL |
| 513415 | 2008 SP_{272} | — | September 23, 2008 | Mount Lemmon | Mount Lemmon Survey | · | 960 m | MPC · JPL |
| 513416 | 2008 SN_{277} | — | September 24, 2008 | Mount Lemmon | Mount Lemmon Survey | · | 1.5 km | MPC · JPL |
| 513417 | 2008 SV_{304} | — | September 25, 2008 | Kitt Peak | Spacewatch | · | 830 m | MPC · JPL |
| 513418 | 2008 TP_{72} | — | October 2, 2008 | Kitt Peak | Spacewatch | (5) | 840 m | MPC · JPL |
| 513419 | 2008 TB_{88} | — | September 25, 2008 | Kitt Peak | Spacewatch | · | 970 m | MPC · JPL |
| 513420 | 2008 TD_{90} | — | September 22, 2008 | Mount Lemmon | Mount Lemmon Survey | · | 1.4 km | MPC · JPL |
| 513421 | 2008 TH_{121} | — | October 7, 2008 | Mount Lemmon | Mount Lemmon Survey | · | 1.2 km | MPC · JPL |
| 513422 | 2008 TD_{185} | — | October 6, 2008 | Mount Lemmon | Mount Lemmon Survey | ADE | 1.6 km | MPC · JPL |
| 513423 | 2008 UF_{41} | — | October 20, 2008 | Kitt Peak | Spacewatch | · | 900 m | MPC · JPL |
| 513424 | 2008 UT_{53} | — | October 20, 2008 | Kitt Peak | Spacewatch | · | 1.1 km | MPC · JPL |
| 513425 | 2008 UV_{54} | — | September 27, 2008 | Mount Lemmon | Mount Lemmon Survey | (1547) | 1.3 km | MPC · JPL |
| 513426 | 2008 UU_{56} | — | October 21, 2008 | Mount Lemmon | Mount Lemmon Survey | H | 460 m | MPC · JPL |
| 513427 | 2008 UO_{89} | — | October 8, 2008 | Mount Lemmon | Mount Lemmon Survey | · | 1.1 km | MPC · JPL |
| 513428 | 2008 UA_{129} | — | October 23, 2008 | Kitt Peak | Spacewatch | (5) | 930 m | MPC · JPL |
| 513429 | 2008 UM_{141} | — | September 22, 2008 | Mount Lemmon | Mount Lemmon Survey | · | 1.2 km | MPC · JPL |
| 513430 | 2008 UB_{151} | — | October 23, 2008 | Kitt Peak | Spacewatch | 3:2 · SHU | 4.1 km | MPC · JPL |
| 513431 | 2008 UY_{172} | — | October 24, 2008 | Kitt Peak | Spacewatch | (5) | 1.0 km | MPC · JPL |
| 513432 | 2008 UK_{202} | — | October 27, 2008 | Mount Lemmon | Mount Lemmon Survey | (5) | 1.1 km | MPC · JPL |
| 513433 | 2008 UC_{259} | — | September 22, 2008 | Mount Lemmon | Mount Lemmon Survey | T_{j} (2.98) · 3:2 | 4.1 km | MPC · JPL |
| 513434 | 2008 UW_{269} | — | October 1, 2008 | Kitt Peak | Spacewatch | · | 1.1 km | MPC · JPL |
| 513435 | 2008 UK_{299} | — | October 25, 2008 | Kitt Peak | Spacewatch | · | 1.2 km | MPC · JPL |
| 513436 | 2008 UT_{309} | — | October 30, 2008 | Catalina | CSS | (1547) | 1.6 km | MPC · JPL |
| 513437 | 2008 UR_{317} | — | September 27, 2008 | Mount Lemmon | Mount Lemmon Survey | EUN | 1.0 km | MPC · JPL |
| 513438 | 2008 UM_{324} | — | October 31, 2008 | Kitt Peak | Spacewatch | · | 1.2 km | MPC · JPL |
| 513439 | 2008 UQ_{342} | — | October 28, 2008 | Kitt Peak | Spacewatch | 3:2 | 4.3 km | MPC · JPL |
| 513440 | 2008 UL_{345} | — | October 31, 2008 | Catalina | CSS | · | 1.4 km | MPC · JPL |
| 513441 | 2008 UT_{364} | — | October 1, 2008 | Catalina | CSS | · | 1.4 km | MPC · JPL |
| 513442 | 2008 UR_{367} | — | October 25, 2008 | Catalina | CSS | · | 1.2 km | MPC · JPL |
| 513443 | 2008 VQ_{28} | — | October 2, 2008 | Socorro | LINEAR | T_{j} (2.93) · 3:2 | 4.2 km | MPC · JPL |
| 513444 | 2008 VX_{43} | — | November 3, 2008 | Kitt Peak | Spacewatch | T_{j} (2.96) | 3.0 km | MPC · JPL |
| 513445 | 2008 VE_{61} | — | November 8, 2008 | Mount Lemmon | Mount Lemmon Survey | V | 800 m | MPC · JPL |
| 513446 | 2008 VY_{81} | — | November 2, 2008 | Mount Lemmon | Mount Lemmon Survey | · | 1.5 km | MPC · JPL |
| 513447 | 2008 WO | — | November 17, 2008 | La Sagra | OAM | (5) | 1.1 km | MPC · JPL |
| 513448 | 2008 WA_{80} | — | October 27, 2008 | Mount Lemmon | Mount Lemmon Survey | · | 1.3 km | MPC · JPL |
| 513449 | 2008 WN_{130} | — | November 24, 2008 | Catalina | CSS | · | 1.0 km | MPC · JPL |
| 513450 | 2008 WF_{134} | — | November 20, 2008 | Mount Lemmon | Mount Lemmon Survey | MAR | 860 m | MPC · JPL |
| 513451 | 2008 XC_{49} | — | December 5, 2008 | Kitt Peak | Spacewatch | · | 1.4 km | MPC · JPL |
| 513452 | 2008 XB_{56} | — | December 2, 2008 | Kitt Peak | Spacewatch | · | 1.8 km | MPC · JPL |
| 513453 | 2008 YL_{67} | — | December 30, 2008 | Mount Lemmon | Mount Lemmon Survey | · | 1.6 km | MPC · JPL |
| 513454 | 2008 YY_{70} | — | December 29, 2008 | Mount Lemmon | Mount Lemmon Survey | · | 1.5 km | MPC · JPL |
| 513455 | 2008 YG_{105} | — | December 29, 2008 | Kitt Peak | Spacewatch | · | 1.2 km | MPC · JPL |
| 513456 | 2008 YE_{121} | — | December 22, 2008 | Kitt Peak | Spacewatch | (5) | 1 km | MPC · JPL |
| 513457 | 2008 YZ_{142} | — | December 22, 2008 | Kitt Peak | Spacewatch | · | 1.3 km | MPC · JPL |
| 513458 | 2008 YB_{165} | — | December 29, 2008 | Mount Lemmon | Mount Lemmon Survey | EUN | 1.0 km | MPC · JPL |
| 513459 | 2009 AP_{30} | — | January 2, 2009 | Kitt Peak | Spacewatch | · | 1.2 km | MPC · JPL |
| 513460 | 2009 AE_{40} | — | December 21, 2008 | Mount Lemmon | Mount Lemmon Survey | · | 1.4 km | MPC · JPL |
| 513461 | 2009 AE_{49} | — | September 28, 2003 | Kitt Peak | Spacewatch | JUN | 860 m | MPC · JPL |
| 513462 | 2009 BR_{34} | — | January 16, 2009 | Kitt Peak | Spacewatch | EUN | 1.2 km | MPC · JPL |
| 513463 | 2009 BB_{45} | — | January 16, 2009 | Kitt Peak | Spacewatch | MRX | 860 m | MPC · JPL |
| 513464 | 2009 BV_{47} | — | January 2, 2009 | Mount Lemmon | Mount Lemmon Survey | · | 1.2 km | MPC · JPL |
| 513465 | 2009 BK_{66} | — | January 20, 2009 | Kitt Peak | Spacewatch | · | 1.4 km | MPC · JPL |
| 513466 | 2009 BJ_{98} | — | November 24, 2008 | Mount Lemmon | Mount Lemmon Survey | · | 1.2 km | MPC · JPL |
| 513467 | 2009 BP_{175} | — | January 29, 2009 | Mount Lemmon | Mount Lemmon Survey | · | 1.7 km | MPC · JPL |
| 513468 | 2009 BL_{177} | — | January 30, 2009 | Mount Lemmon | Mount Lemmon Survey | AGN | 960 m | MPC · JPL |
| 513469 | 2009 BG_{181} | — | January 17, 2009 | Mount Lemmon | Mount Lemmon Survey | (1547) | 1.8 km | MPC · JPL |
| 513470 | 2009 BJ_{192} | — | January 18, 2009 | Kitt Peak | Spacewatch | EUN | 950 m | MPC · JPL |
| 513471 | 2009 CU_{4} | — | December 20, 2008 | Mount Lemmon | Mount Lemmon Survey | · | 1.2 km | MPC · JPL |
| 513472 | 2009 CS_{5} | — | February 14, 2009 | Kitt Peak | Spacewatch | APO | 480 m | MPC · JPL |
| 513473 | 2009 CR_{38} | — | January 8, 2000 | Kitt Peak | Spacewatch | · | 900 m | MPC · JPL |
| 513474 | 2009 DC_{6} | — | January 1, 2009 | Kitt Peak | Spacewatch | · | 1.8 km | MPC · JPL |
| 513475 | 2009 DK_{7} | — | February 4, 2009 | Mount Lemmon | Mount Lemmon Survey | · | 1.3 km | MPC · JPL |
| 513476 | 2009 DL_{25} | — | January 31, 2009 | Kitt Peak | Spacewatch | · | 1.5 km | MPC · JPL |
| 513477 | 2009 DR_{26} | — | February 22, 2009 | Calar Alto | F. Hormuth | · | 1.5 km | MPC · JPL |
| 513478 | 2009 DG_{37} | — | February 1, 2009 | Kitt Peak | Spacewatch | · | 1.6 km | MPC · JPL |
| 513479 | 2009 DK_{39} | — | January 29, 2009 | Mount Lemmon | Mount Lemmon Survey | · | 1.6 km | MPC · JPL |
| 513480 | 2009 DW_{45} | — | February 3, 2009 | Mount Lemmon | Mount Lemmon Survey | · | 1.7 km | MPC · JPL |
| 513481 | 2009 DB_{56} | — | February 22, 2009 | Kitt Peak | Spacewatch | · | 1.7 km | MPC · JPL |
| 513482 | 2009 DN_{58} | — | February 22, 2009 | Kitt Peak | Spacewatch | · | 1.3 km | MPC · JPL |
| 513483 | 2009 DT_{59} | — | February 3, 2009 | Kitt Peak | Spacewatch | · | 1.9 km | MPC · JPL |
| 513484 | 2009 DC_{61} | — | February 22, 2009 | Kitt Peak | Spacewatch | · | 2.2 km | MPC · JPL |
| 513485 | 2009 DK_{66} | — | February 24, 2009 | Mount Lemmon | Mount Lemmon Survey | · | 1.5 km | MPC · JPL |
| 513486 | 2009 DE_{68} | — | January 1, 2009 | Kitt Peak | Spacewatch | · | 1.3 km | MPC · JPL |
| 513487 | 2009 DS_{96} | — | January 31, 2009 | Kitt Peak | Spacewatch | · | 1.5 km | MPC · JPL |
| 513488 | 2009 DM_{98} | — | February 16, 2004 | Kitt Peak | Spacewatch | AGN | 1.2 km | MPC · JPL |
| 513489 | 2009 EV | — | August 3, 2008 | Socorro | LINEAR | APO · PHA | 340 m | MPC · JPL |
| 513490 | 2009 EH_{23} | — | March 7, 2009 | Mount Lemmon | Mount Lemmon Survey | · | 2.1 km | MPC · JPL |
| 513491 | 2009 FM | — | January 27, 2009 | XuYi | PMO NEO Survey Program | · | 1.8 km | MPC · JPL |
| 513492 | 2009 FA_{14} | — | December 31, 2008 | Mount Lemmon | Mount Lemmon Survey | · | 1.1 km | MPC · JPL |
| 513493 | 2009 FF_{48} | — | February 20, 2009 | Kitt Peak | Spacewatch | · | 1.6 km | MPC · JPL |
| 513494 | 2009 FC_{57} | — | February 27, 2009 | Catalina | CSS | · | 2.3 km | MPC · JPL |
| 513495 | 2009 HB_{32} | — | March 16, 2009 | Kitt Peak | Spacewatch | DOR | 2.0 km | MPC · JPL |
| 513496 | 2009 HM_{57} | — | April 2, 2009 | Kitt Peak | Spacewatch | · | 2.1 km | MPC · JPL |
| 513497 | 2009 HB_{82} | — | April 23, 2009 | Siding Spring | SSS | AMO +1km | 1.0 km | MPC · JPL |
| 513498 | 2009 HH_{84} | — | April 27, 2009 | Kitt Peak | Spacewatch | · | 1.8 km | MPC · JPL |
| 513499 | 2009 HX_{108} | — | February 7, 2008 | Mount Lemmon | Mount Lemmon Survey | · | 1.6 km | MPC · JPL |
| 513500 | 2009 KE_{37} | — | April 19, 2009 | Kitt Peak | Spacewatch | L5 | 10 km | MPC · JPL |

== 513501–513600 ==
back to top

| Designation | | | Discovery | | | Properties | | Ref |
| Permanent | Provisional | Named after | Date | Site | Discoverer(s) | Category | Diam. | Ref |
|---|---|---|---|---|---|---|---|---|
| 513501 | 2009 OY_{20} | — | July 25, 2009 | La Sagra | OAM | · | 2.9 km | MPC · JPL |
| 513502 | 2009 OB_{23} | — | July 31, 2009 | Tiki | Teamo, N. | · | 3.0 km | MPC · JPL |
| 513503 | 2009 PD_{9} | — | August 15, 2009 | Kitt Peak | Spacewatch | · | 2.7 km | MPC · JPL |
| 513504 | 2009 QD_{5} | — | August 16, 2009 | La Sagra | OAM | · | 3.7 km | MPC · JPL |
| 513505 | 2009 QO_{21} | — | August 16, 2009 | La Sagra | OAM | · | 990 m | MPC · JPL |
| 513506 | 2009 QK_{28} | — | August 19, 2009 | La Sagra | OAM | AEG | 2.7 km | MPC · JPL |
| 513507 | 2009 QE_{32} | — | July 28, 2009 | Kitt Peak | Spacewatch | · | 2.8 km | MPC · JPL |
| 513508 | 2009 QD_{59} | — | August 16, 2009 | Kitt Peak | Spacewatch | · | 700 m | MPC · JPL |
| 513509 | 2009 RH_{52} | — | September 15, 2009 | Kitt Peak | Spacewatch | · | 870 m | MPC · JPL |
| 513510 | 2009 RL_{58} | — | September 15, 2009 | Kitt Peak | Spacewatch | · | 1.2 km | MPC · JPL |
| 513511 | 2009 RY_{58} | — | September 15, 2009 | Mount Lemmon | Mount Lemmon Survey | VER | 2.4 km | MPC · JPL |
| 513512 | 2009 RB_{67} | — | August 18, 2009 | Kitt Peak | Spacewatch | · | 2.5 km | MPC · JPL |
| 513513 | 2009 SA_{50} | — | August 18, 2009 | Kitt Peak | Spacewatch | · | 3.2 km | MPC · JPL |
| 513514 | 2009 SG_{154} | — | March 10, 2007 | Mount Lemmon | Mount Lemmon Survey | · | 870 m | MPC · JPL |
| 513515 | 2009 SO_{250} | — | September 19, 2009 | Kitt Peak | Spacewatch | · | 910 m | MPC · JPL |
| 513516 | 2009 ST_{313} | — | September 18, 2009 | Kitt Peak | Spacewatch | · | 870 m | MPC · JPL |
| 513517 | 2009 SA_{315} | — | August 15, 2009 | Kitt Peak | Spacewatch | MAS | 570 m | MPC · JPL |
| 513518 | 2009 UC_{72} | — | October 23, 2009 | Mount Lemmon | Mount Lemmon Survey | NYS | 900 m | MPC · JPL |
| 513519 | 2009 UE_{98} | — | October 23, 2009 | Mount Lemmon | Mount Lemmon Survey | · | 1.0 km | MPC · JPL |
| 513520 | 2009 UB_{152} | — | October 21, 2009 | Mount Lemmon | Mount Lemmon Survey | · | 900 m | MPC · JPL |
| 513521 | 2009 VS_{5} | — | October 21, 2009 | Catalina | CSS | H | 500 m | MPC · JPL |
| 513522 | 2009 VE_{20} | — | October 23, 2009 | Mount Lemmon | Mount Lemmon Survey | · | 800 m | MPC · JPL |
| 513523 | 2009 WW_{18} | — | November 17, 2009 | Mount Lemmon | Mount Lemmon Survey | · | 880 m | MPC · JPL |
| 513524 | 2009 WW_{32} | — | November 16, 2009 | Kitt Peak | Spacewatch | · | 910 m | MPC · JPL |
| 513525 | 2009 WF_{37} | — | November 17, 2009 | Kitt Peak | Spacewatch | NYS | 950 m | MPC · JPL |
| 513526 | 2009 WG_{127} | — | October 24, 2005 | Kitt Peak | Spacewatch | · | 760 m | MPC · JPL |
| 513527 | 2009 WJ_{181} | — | October 12, 2009 | Mount Lemmon | Mount Lemmon Survey | · | 930 m | MPC · JPL |
| 513528 | 2010 AH_{61} | — | September 30, 2009 | Mount Lemmon | Mount Lemmon Survey | T_{j} (2.98) · 3:2 | 6.7 km | MPC · JPL |
| 513529 | 2010 CR_{1} | — | February 9, 2010 | Siding Spring | SSS | APO +1km | 790 m | MPC · JPL |
| 513530 | 2010 CY_{16} | — | February 11, 2010 | WISE | WISE | · | 1.9 km | MPC · JPL |
| 513531 | 2010 CW_{100} | — | February 6, 2010 | Mount Lemmon | Mount Lemmon Survey | H | 440 m | MPC · JPL |
| 513532 | 2010 DC_{2} | — | November 22, 2009 | Mount Lemmon | Mount Lemmon Survey | · | 1.8 km | MPC · JPL |
| 513533 | 2010 DW_{6} | — | February 16, 2010 | Kitt Peak | Spacewatch | H | 620 m | MPC · JPL |
| 513534 | 2010 EB_{22} | — | March 10, 2010 | La Sagra | OAM | H | 480 m | MPC · JPL |
| 513535 | 2010 EW_{35} | — | March 10, 2010 | La Sagra | OAM | H | 480 m | MPC · JPL |
| 513536 | 2010 EA_{76} | — | March 12, 2010 | Kitt Peak | Spacewatch | · | 1.2 km | MPC · JPL |
| 513537 | 2010 ED_{104} | — | February 15, 2010 | Catalina | CSS | H | 630 m | MPC · JPL |
| 513538 | 2010 FP_{91} | — | March 25, 2010 | Mount Lemmon | Mount Lemmon Survey | · | 910 m | MPC · JPL |
| 513539 | 2010 GK_{32} | — | April 7, 2010 | La Sagra | OAM | · | 910 m | MPC · JPL |
| 513540 | 2010 JZ_{4} | — | October 10, 2008 | Mount Lemmon | Mount Lemmon Survey | · | 2.3 km | MPC · JPL |
| 513541 | 2010 JF_{43} | — | May 3, 2010 | Kitt Peak | Spacewatch | · | 1.4 km | MPC · JPL |
| 513542 | 2010 JG_{43} | — | November 8, 2008 | Mount Lemmon | Mount Lemmon Survey | H | 540 m | MPC · JPL |
| 513543 | 2010 JY_{75} | — | November 3, 2007 | Kitt Peak | Spacewatch | · | 1.8 km | MPC · JPL |
| 513544 | 2010 JC_{104} | — | May 11, 2010 | WISE | WISE | · | 1.5 km | MPC · JPL |
| 513545 | 2010 JB_{122} | — | April 9, 2010 | Kitt Peak | Spacewatch | · | 1.8 km | MPC · JPL |
| 513546 | 2010 LZ_{14} | — | June 5, 2010 | Kitt Peak | Spacewatch | · | 2.0 km | MPC · JPL |
| 513547 | 2010 MG_{40} | — | June 22, 2010 | WISE | WISE | · | 4.2 km | MPC · JPL |
| 513548 | 2010 ML_{94} | — | March 8, 2008 | Mount Lemmon | Mount Lemmon Survey | · | 3.6 km | MPC · JPL |
| 513549 | 2010 MA_{116} | — | June 20, 2010 | Mount Lemmon | Mount Lemmon Survey | · | 2.8 km | MPC · JPL |
| 513550 | 2010 NG_{3} | — | July 8, 2010 | WISE | WISE | AMO +1km | 1.5 km | MPC · JPL |
| 513551 | 2010 NQ_{36} | — | July 8, 2010 | WISE | WISE | · | 3.3 km | MPC · JPL |
| 513552 | 2010 NN_{66} | — | May 24, 2010 | Kitt Peak | Spacewatch | DOR | 2.6 km | MPC · JPL |
| 513553 | 2010 ND_{104} | — | July 12, 2010 | WISE | WISE | · | 3.0 km | MPC · JPL |
| 513554 | 2010 OS_{45} | — | July 22, 2010 | WISE | WISE | · | 3.8 km | MPC · JPL |
| 513555 | 2010 OK_{79} | — | July 26, 2010 | WISE | WISE | T_{j} (2.99) · EUP | 4.1 km | MPC · JPL |
| 513556 | 2010 OY_{85} | — | July 27, 2010 | WISE | WISE | · | 3.8 km | MPC · JPL |
| 513557 NIGPAS | 2010 PE_{74} | NIGPAS | August 10, 2010 | XuYi | PMO NEO Survey Program | · | 2.3 km | MPC · JPL |
| 513558 | 2010 RJ_{87} | — | February 25, 2007 | Mount Lemmon | Mount Lemmon Survey | (1298) | 2.8 km | MPC · JPL |
| 513559 | 2010 RP_{133} | — | January 28, 2007 | Mount Lemmon | Mount Lemmon Survey | · | 3.2 km | MPC · JPL |
| 513560 | 2010 RT_{147} | — | September 6, 2010 | Kitt Peak | Spacewatch | · | 3.2 km | MPC · JPL |
| 513561 | 2010 RL_{188} | — | June 11, 2011 | Mount Lemmon | Mount Lemmon Survey | L5 | 9.3 km | MPC · JPL |
| 513562 | 2010 TX_{58} | — | July 15, 2010 | WISE | WISE | · | 2.7 km | MPC · JPL |
| 513563 | 2010 TP_{60} | — | September 18, 2010 | Mount Lemmon | Mount Lemmon Survey | · | 2.8 km | MPC · JPL |
| 513564 | 2010 TM_{66} | — | September 19, 2010 | Kitt Peak | Spacewatch | EOS | 1.7 km | MPC · JPL |
| 513565 | 2010 UD_{7} | — | October 17, 2010 | Mount Lemmon | Mount Lemmon Survey | · | 580 m | MPC · JPL |
| 513566 | 2010 UO_{12} | — | July 15, 2010 | WISE | WISE | · | 600 m | MPC · JPL |
| 513567 | 2010 UC_{102} | — | April 29, 2008 | Kitt Peak | Spacewatch | EOS | 1.6 km | MPC · JPL |
| 513568 | 2010 UQ_{108} | — | October 19, 2010 | Mount Lemmon | Mount Lemmon Survey | · | 2.1 km | MPC · JPL |
| 513569 | 2010 UU_{108} | — | October 17, 2010 | Mount Lemmon | Mount Lemmon Survey | · | 2.7 km | MPC · JPL |
| 513570 | 2010 VY_{12} | — | July 13, 2010 | WISE | WISE | · | 2.9 km | MPC · JPL |
| 513571 | 2010 VW_{26} | — | May 4, 2005 | Kitt Peak | Spacewatch | PHO | 710 m | MPC · JPL |
| 513572 | 2010 VX_{39} | — | November 5, 2010 | Socorro | LINEAR | AMO | 500 m | MPC · JPL |
| 513573 | 2010 VN_{93} | — | September 3, 2010 | Mount Lemmon | Mount Lemmon Survey | · | 3.2 km | MPC · JPL |
| 513574 | 2010 VC_{101} | — | November 5, 2010 | Kitt Peak | Spacewatch | · | 2.9 km | MPC · JPL |
| 513575 | 2010 VF_{179} | — | November 1, 2010 | Kitt Peak | Spacewatch | · | 3.3 km | MPC · JPL |
| 513576 | 2010 VS_{191} | — | September 18, 2010 | Mount Lemmon | Mount Lemmon Survey | · | 2.8 km | MPC · JPL |
| 513577 | 2010 VH_{213} | — | September 14, 2010 | Mount Lemmon | Mount Lemmon Survey | · | 2.7 km | MPC · JPL |
| 513578 | 2010 VX_{217} | — | March 28, 2008 | Kitt Peak | Spacewatch | · | 2.8 km | MPC · JPL |
| 513579 | 2010 VB_{219} | — | December 8, 2005 | Kitt Peak | Spacewatch | EOS | 2.1 km | MPC · JPL |
| 513580 | 2010 WW_{2} | — | November 8, 2010 | Kitt Peak | Spacewatch | · | 540 m | MPC · JPL |
| 513581 | 2010 WT_{62} | — | November 27, 2010 | Mount Lemmon | Mount Lemmon Survey | · | 520 m | MPC · JPL |
| 513582 | 2010 XA_{50} | — | December 8, 2010 | Catalina | CSS | · | 4.5 km | MPC · JPL |
| 513583 | 2010 YW_{2} | — | January 23, 2006 | Kitt Peak | Spacewatch | · | 3.4 km | MPC · JPL |
| 513584 | 2011 AF_{38} | — | December 8, 2010 | Mount Lemmon | Mount Lemmon Survey | · | 520 m | MPC · JPL |
| 513585 | 2011 AS_{60} | — | January 13, 2011 | Kitt Peak | Spacewatch | · | 580 m | MPC · JPL |
| 513586 | 2011 CQ_{3} | — | January 28, 2011 | Mount Lemmon | Mount Lemmon Survey | · | 780 m | MPC · JPL |
| 513587 | 2011 CD_{14} | — | January 13, 2011 | Kitt Peak | Spacewatch | · | 760 m | MPC · JPL |
| 513588 | 2011 CP_{27} | — | September 19, 2006 | Kitt Peak | Spacewatch | · | 540 m | MPC · JPL |
| 513589 | 2011 CB_{36} | — | December 8, 2010 | Mount Lemmon | Mount Lemmon Survey | · | 550 m | MPC · JPL |
| 513590 | 2011 CW_{54} | — | February 8, 2011 | Mount Lemmon | Mount Lemmon Survey | · | 560 m | MPC · JPL |
| 513591 | 2011 CC_{92} | — | February 5, 2011 | Catalina | CSS | · | 820 m | MPC · JPL |
| 513592 | 2011 DW_{7} | — | February 22, 2011 | Kitt Peak | Spacewatch | · | 970 m | MPC · JPL |
| 513593 | 2011 DR_{24} | — | February 17, 2004 | Socorro | LINEAR | · | 710 m | MPC · JPL |
| 513594 | 2011 DP_{25} | — | March 19, 2004 | Socorro | LINEAR | · | 940 m | MPC · JPL |
| 513595 | 2011 DX_{50} | — | February 6, 2011 | Catalina | CSS | PHO | 1.0 km | MPC · JPL |
| 513596 | 2011 EV_{42} | — | March 5, 2011 | Kitt Peak | Spacewatch | · | 930 m | MPC · JPL |
| 513597 | 2011 EV_{43} | — | February 25, 2011 | Kitt Peak | Spacewatch | MAS | 560 m | MPC · JPL |
| 513598 | 2011 EH_{68} | — | October 14, 2009 | Mount Lemmon | Mount Lemmon Survey | (2076) | 820 m | MPC · JPL |
| 513599 | 2011 FD_{1} | — | September 26, 2006 | Kitt Peak | Spacewatch | PHO | 760 m | MPC · JPL |
| 513600 | 2011 FZ_{39} | — | March 13, 2011 | Kitt Peak | Spacewatch | NYS | 820 m | MPC · JPL |

== 513601–513700 ==
back to top

| Designation | | | Discovery | | | Properties | | Ref |
| Permanent | Provisional | Named after | Date | Site | Discoverer(s) | Category | Diam. | Ref |
|---|---|---|---|---|---|---|---|---|
| 513601 | 2011 FB_{82} | — | October 1, 2005 | Mount Lemmon | Mount Lemmon Survey | · | 960 m | MPC · JPL |
| 513602 | 2011 FU_{145} | — | September 23, 2008 | Mount Lemmon | Mount Lemmon Survey | PHO | 960 m | MPC · JPL |
| 513603 | 2011 FX_{152} | — | January 9, 2007 | Kitt Peak | Spacewatch | · | 1 km | MPC · JPL |
| 513604 | 2011 GY_{12} | — | December 27, 2006 | Mount Lemmon | Mount Lemmon Survey | · | 930 m | MPC · JPL |
| 513605 | 2011 GA_{30} | — | February 25, 2011 | Kitt Peak | Spacewatch | · | 650 m | MPC · JPL |
| 513606 | 2011 GL_{34} | — | April 26, 2000 | Kitt Peak | Spacewatch | · | 990 m | MPC · JPL |
| 513607 | 2011 GV_{42} | — | February 25, 2011 | Kitt Peak | Spacewatch | MAS | 530 m | MPC · JPL |
| 513608 | 2011 GV_{55} | — | April 6, 2011 | Mount Lemmon | Mount Lemmon Survey | V | 520 m | MPC · JPL |
| 513609 | 2011 GW_{58} | — | April 5, 2000 | Socorro | LINEAR | · | 1.0 km | MPC · JPL |
| 513610 | 2011 GO_{67} | — | May 15, 2004 | Socorro | LINEAR | · | 1.0 km | MPC · JPL |
| 513611 | 2011 GV_{67} | — | March 27, 2011 | Mount Lemmon | Mount Lemmon Survey | · | 1.3 km | MPC · JPL |
| 513612 | 2011 GZ_{73} | — | February 17, 2007 | Kitt Peak | Spacewatch | · | 880 m | MPC · JPL |
| 513613 | 2011 HX | — | April 24, 2011 | Haleakala | Pan-STARRS 1 | H | 410 m | MPC · JPL |
| 513614 | 2011 HG_{31} | — | March 13, 2011 | Mount Lemmon | Mount Lemmon Survey | V | 720 m | MPC · JPL |
| 513615 | 2011 HA_{53} | — | April 30, 2011 | Mount Lemmon | Mount Lemmon Survey | H | 470 m | MPC · JPL |
| 513616 | 2011 HS_{66} | — | September 23, 2008 | Mount Lemmon | Mount Lemmon Survey | NYS | 1.1 km | MPC · JPL |
| 513617 | 2011 HS_{68} | — | January 27, 2007 | Kitt Peak | Spacewatch | NYS | 910 m | MPC · JPL |
| 513618 | 2011 HW_{68} | — | April 12, 2011 | Kitt Peak | Spacewatch | · | 1.1 km | MPC · JPL |
| 513619 | 2011 HG_{75} | — | September 9, 2008 | Mount Lemmon | Mount Lemmon Survey | · | 1.0 km | MPC · JPL |
| 513620 | 2011 JE_{16} | — | February 6, 2007 | Kitt Peak | Spacewatch | · | 940 m | MPC · JPL |
| 513621 | 2011 JH_{16} | — | April 22, 2007 | Mount Lemmon | Mount Lemmon Survey | · | 970 m | MPC · JPL |
| 513622 | 2011 JS_{24} | — | April 14, 2011 | Mount Lemmon | Mount Lemmon Survey | V | 610 m | MPC · JPL |
| 513623 | 2011 KH_{8} | — | May 21, 2011 | Haleakala | Pan-STARRS 1 | · | 1.2 km | MPC · JPL |
| 513624 | 2011 KV_{11} | — | April 13, 2011 | Haleakala | Pan-STARRS 1 | · | 1.2 km | MPC · JPL |
| 513625 | 2011 KD_{15} | — | February 23, 2007 | Kitt Peak | Spacewatch | · | 1.3 km | MPC · JPL |
| 513626 | 2011 KC_{30} | — | January 30, 2011 | Haleakala | Pan-STARRS 1 | · | 1.8 km | MPC · JPL |
| 513627 | 2011 KU_{47} | — | May 24, 2011 | Mount Lemmon | Mount Lemmon Survey | BAR | 1.6 km | MPC · JPL |
| 513628 | 2011 LM_{8} | — | March 10, 2007 | Mount Lemmon | Mount Lemmon Survey | MAS | 650 m | MPC · JPL |
| 513629 | 2011 OU_{5} | — | July 24, 2011 | Haleakala | Pan-STARRS 1 | · | 1.9 km | MPC · JPL |
| 513630 | 2011 OS_{22} | — | September 9, 2007 | Kitt Peak | Spacewatch | · | 1.4 km | MPC · JPL |
| 513631 | 2011 OH_{29} | — | July 31, 2011 | Haleakala | Pan-STARRS 1 | H | 410 m | MPC · JPL |
| 513632 | 2011 OR_{52} | — | February 15, 2010 | Kitt Peak | Spacewatch | · | 2.6 km | MPC · JPL |
| 513633 | 2011 OU_{58} | — | July 27, 2011 | Haleakala | Pan-STARRS 1 | L5 | 10 km | MPC · JPL |
| 513634 | 2011 OP_{60} | — | July 27, 2011 | Haleakala | Pan-STARRS 1 | L5 | 8.8 km | MPC · JPL |
| 513635 | 2011 QQ_{25} | — | August 20, 2011 | Haleakala | Pan-STARRS 1 | · | 1.1 km | MPC · JPL |
| 513636 | 2011 QW_{43} | — | January 16, 2010 | WISE | WISE | · | 1.9 km | MPC · JPL |
| 513637 | 2011 QF_{46} | — | August 29, 2011 | Haleakala | Pan-STARRS 1 | H | 350 m | MPC · JPL |
| 513638 | 2011 QD_{57} | — | August 28, 2011 | Haleakala | Pan-STARRS 1 | H | 410 m | MPC · JPL |
| 513639 | 2011 QF_{62} | — | August 20, 2011 | Haleakala | Pan-STARRS 1 | BRA | 1.2 km | MPC · JPL |
| 513640 | 2011 QR_{73} | — | August 20, 2011 | Haleakala | Pan-STARRS 1 | L5 | 8.9 km | MPC · JPL |
| 513641 | 2011 QS_{77} | — | August 23, 2011 | Haleakala | Pan-STARRS 1 | · | 1.5 km | MPC · JPL |
| 513642 | 2011 QE_{93} | — | August 30, 2011 | Haleakala | Pan-STARRS 1 | H | 450 m | MPC · JPL |
| 513643 | 2011 RV_{4} | — | September 2, 2011 | Haleakala | Pan-STARRS 1 | · | 1.5 km | MPC · JPL |
| 513644 | 2011 RX_{8} | — | October 9, 2007 | Mount Lemmon | Mount Lemmon Survey | · | 1.3 km | MPC · JPL |
| 513645 | 2011 RG_{10} | — | September 2, 2011 | Haleakala | Pan-STARRS 1 | 615 | 1.1 km | MPC · JPL |
| 513646 | 2011 SO_{6} | — | June 8, 2011 | Haleakala | Pan-STARRS 1 | MRX | 1.0 km | MPC · JPL |
| 513647 | 2011 SX_{21} | — | September 20, 2011 | Haleakala | Pan-STARRS 1 | H | 550 m | MPC · JPL |
| 513648 | 2011 SP_{31} | — | March 16, 2010 | Mount Lemmon | Mount Lemmon Survey | H | 450 m | MPC · JPL |
| 513649 | 2011 SE_{38} | — | July 9, 2011 | Haleakala | Pan-STARRS 1 | · | 2.2 km | MPC · JPL |
| 513650 | 2011 SE_{45} | — | November 19, 2007 | Mount Lemmon | Mount Lemmon Survey | · | 1.7 km | MPC · JPL |
| 513651 | 2011 SS_{66} | — | September 2, 2011 | Haleakala | Pan-STARRS 1 | · | 2.4 km | MPC · JPL |
| 513652 | 2011 SW_{89} | — | September 22, 2011 | Kitt Peak | Spacewatch | H | 550 m | MPC · JPL |
| 513653 | 2011 SX_{107} | — | September 26, 2011 | Mount Lemmon | Mount Lemmon Survey | MAR | 1.1 km | MPC · JPL |
| 513654 | 2011 SA_{146} | — | September 4, 2011 | Haleakala | Pan-STARRS 1 | · | 1.7 km | MPC · JPL |
| 513655 | 2011 SL_{150} | — | September 26, 2011 | Haleakala | Pan-STARRS 1 | GEF | 1.2 km | MPC · JPL |
| 513656 | 2011 SB_{155} | — | September 8, 2011 | Kitt Peak | Spacewatch | HOF | 2.0 km | MPC · JPL |
| 513657 | 2011 SO_{235} | — | March 3, 2009 | Mount Lemmon | Mount Lemmon Survey | GEF | 1.1 km | MPC · JPL |
| 513658 | 2011 SO_{254} | — | November 4, 2007 | Kitt Peak | Spacewatch | · | 1.5 km | MPC · JPL |
| 513659 | 2011 TO_{8} | — | March 16, 2007 | Mount Lemmon | Mount Lemmon Survey | H | 490 m | MPC · JPL |
| 513660 | 2011 UC_{11} | — | August 27, 2011 | Haleakala | Pan-STARRS 1 | · | 1.7 km | MPC · JPL |
| 513661 | 2011 UU_{95} | — | September 25, 2006 | Mount Lemmon | Mount Lemmon Survey | KOR | 910 m | MPC · JPL |
| 513662 | 2011 UN_{113} | — | October 20, 2011 | Kitt Peak | Spacewatch | · | 2.8 km | MPC · JPL |
| 513663 | 2011 UL_{158} | — | October 21, 2006 | Mount Lemmon | Mount Lemmon Survey | · | 2.3 km | MPC · JPL |
| 513664 | 2011 UX_{250} | — | October 26, 2011 | Haleakala | Pan-STARRS 1 | · | 2.3 km | MPC · JPL |
| 513665 | 2011 UD_{315} | — | November 22, 2006 | Kitt Peak | Spacewatch | · | 1.9 km | MPC · JPL |
| 513666 | 2011 UK_{337} | — | October 26, 2011 | Haleakala | Pan-STARRS 1 | · | 2.1 km | MPC · JPL |
| 513667 | 2011 UQ_{343} | — | October 18, 2011 | Haleakala | Pan-STARRS 1 | · | 2.2 km | MPC · JPL |
| 513668 | 2011 UV_{351} | — | October 16, 2006 | Kitt Peak | Spacewatch | EOS | 1.3 km | MPC · JPL |
| 513669 | 2011 UN_{359} | — | October 20, 2011 | Mount Lemmon | Mount Lemmon Survey | · | 2.2 km | MPC · JPL |
| 513670 | 2011 UQ_{363} | — | September 28, 2011 | Kitt Peak | Spacewatch | AGN | 1.1 km | MPC · JPL |
| 513671 | 2011 VZ_{1} | — | September 23, 2011 | Kitt Peak | Spacewatch | · | 2.0 km | MPC · JPL |
| 513672 | 2011 WR_{11} | — | October 26, 2011 | Haleakala | Pan-STARRS 1 | EOS | 1.6 km | MPC · JPL |
| 513673 | 2011 WO_{66} | — | November 25, 2011 | Haleakala | Pan-STARRS 1 | EOS | 1.9 km | MPC · JPL |
| 513674 | 2011 WY_{72} | — | October 25, 2011 | Haleakala | Pan-STARRS 1 | · | 1.7 km | MPC · JPL |
| 513675 | 2011 WN_{76} | — | October 25, 2011 | Haleakala | Pan-STARRS 1 | · | 3.4 km | MPC · JPL |
| 513676 | 2011 WR_{87} | — | October 25, 2011 | Haleakala | Pan-STARRS 1 | · | 2.0 km | MPC · JPL |
| 513677 | 2011 WM_{93} | — | November 15, 2006 | Mount Lemmon | Mount Lemmon Survey | KOR | 1.3 km | MPC · JPL |
| 513678 | 2011 WE_{98} | — | January 17, 2007 | Kitt Peak | Spacewatch | THM | 1.7 km | MPC · JPL |
| 513679 | 2011 WB_{154} | — | April 6, 2008 | Mount Lemmon | Mount Lemmon Survey | · | 2.5 km | MPC · JPL |
| 513680 | 2011 YQ_{27} | — | December 2, 2005 | Kitt Peak | Spacewatch | · | 3.5 km | MPC · JPL |
| 513681 | 2011 YY_{32} | — | December 7, 2005 | Kitt Peak | Spacewatch | · | 4.4 km | MPC · JPL |
| 513682 | 2011 YR_{79} | — | June 19, 2010 | WISE | WISE | EMA | 2.8 km | MPC · JPL |
| 513683 | 2012 AJ_{1} | — | May 30, 2010 | WISE | WISE | EUP | 5.3 km | MPC · JPL |
| 513684 | 2012 AY_{14} | — | July 18, 2010 | WISE | WISE | · | 2.6 km | MPC · JPL |
| 513685 | 2012 BQ_{20} | — | January 14, 2012 | Kitt Peak | Spacewatch | · | 2.7 km | MPC · JPL |
| 513686 | 2012 BU_{27} | — | February 23, 2007 | Kitt Peak | Spacewatch | · | 2.3 km | MPC · JPL |
| 513687 | 2012 BF_{55} | — | February 4, 2006 | Mount Lemmon | Mount Lemmon Survey | · | 3.1 km | MPC · JPL |
| 513688 | 2012 BS_{55} | — | January 21, 2012 | Haleakala | Pan-STARRS 1 | CYB | 3.4 km | MPC · JPL |
| 513689 | 2012 BY_{67} | — | June 19, 2010 | WISE | WISE | · | 3.4 km | MPC · JPL |
| 513690 | 2012 BZ_{89} | — | December 24, 2005 | Kitt Peak | Spacewatch | · | 2.2 km | MPC · JPL |
| 513691 | 2012 BL_{94} | — | January 21, 2012 | Catalina | CSS | · | 2.6 km | MPC · JPL |
| 513692 | 2012 BF_{100} | — | November 2, 2010 | Mount Lemmon | Mount Lemmon Survey | · | 3.2 km | MPC · JPL |
| 513693 | 2012 BS_{102} | — | December 27, 2011 | Mount Lemmon | Mount Lemmon Survey | LIX | 2.7 km | MPC · JPL |
| 513694 | 2012 BL_{111} | — | January 27, 2012 | Kitt Peak | Spacewatch | · | 3.2 km | MPC · JPL |
| 513695 | 2012 BG_{135} | — | January 1, 2012 | Mount Lemmon | Mount Lemmon Survey | · | 2.7 km | MPC · JPL |
| 513696 | 2012 BC_{140} | — | January 19, 2012 | Haleakala | Pan-STARRS 1 | · | 3.0 km | MPC · JPL |
| 513697 | 2012 BN_{141} | — | January 3, 2012 | Kitt Peak | Spacewatch | · | 2.7 km | MPC · JPL |
| 513698 | 2012 BM_{156} | — | March 20, 2007 | Catalina | CSS | · | 3.2 km | MPC · JPL |
| 513699 | 2012 CT_{24} | — | October 7, 2004 | Kitt Peak | Spacewatch | · | 2.8 km | MPC · JPL |
| 513700 | 2012 CQ_{40} | — | February 3, 2012 | Haleakala | Pan-STARRS 1 | · | 2.4 km | MPC · JPL |

== 513701–513800 ==
back to top

| Designation | | | Discovery | | | Properties | | Ref |
| Permanent | Provisional | Named after | Date | Site | Discoverer(s) | Category | Diam. | Ref |
|---|---|---|---|---|---|---|---|---|
| 513701 | 2012 CA_{42} | — | January 19, 2012 | Kitt Peak | Spacewatch | · | 2.5 km | MPC · JPL |
| 513702 | 2012 CL_{42} | — | July 27, 2009 | Kitt Peak | Spacewatch | · | 3.1 km | MPC · JPL |
| 513703 | 2012 CS_{42} | — | January 21, 2012 | Haleakala | Pan-STARRS 1 | · | 3.7 km | MPC · JPL |
| 513704 | 2012 CB_{43} | — | December 1, 2005 | Kitt Peak | Spacewatch | · | 2.9 km | MPC · JPL |
| 513705 | 2012 CA_{44} | — | March 14, 2007 | Kitt Peak | Spacewatch | · | 3.2 km | MPC · JPL |
| 513706 | 2012 CK_{51} | — | January 19, 2012 | Haleakala | Pan-STARRS 1 | · | 3.2 km | MPC · JPL |
| 513707 | 2012 DL_{30} | — | December 2, 2005 | Kitt Peak | Spacewatch | · | 2.6 km | MPC · JPL |
| 513708 | 2012 FC_{11} | — | March 16, 2012 | Haleakala | Pan-STARRS 1 | CYB | 3.1 km | MPC · JPL |
| 513709 | 2012 JS_{45} | — | March 28, 2012 | Mount Lemmon | Mount Lemmon Survey | · | 660 m | MPC · JPL |
| 513710 | 2012 MF_{9} | — | February 11, 2011 | Mount Lemmon | Mount Lemmon Survey | · | 820 m | MPC · JPL |
| 513711 | 2012 PC_{20} | — | August 14, 2012 | Haleakala | Pan-STARRS 1 | AMO | 200 m | MPC · JPL |
| 513712 | 2012 RR_{29} | — | May 1, 2011 | Haleakala | Pan-STARRS 1 | · | 3.2 km | MPC · JPL |
| 513713 | 2012 SL_{2} | — | August 20, 2008 | Kitt Peak | Spacewatch | PHO | 960 m | MPC · JPL |
| 513714 | 2012 SC_{11} | — | October 10, 2008 | Mount Lemmon | Mount Lemmon Survey | · | 1.2 km | MPC · JPL |
| 513715 | 2012 SM_{20} | — | October 24, 2008 | Kitt Peak | Spacewatch | (5) | 960 m | MPC · JPL |
| 513716 | 2012 ST_{30} | — | October 10, 2005 | Catalina | CSS | · | 1.2 km | MPC · JPL |
| 513717 | 2012 SH_{56} | — | March 3, 1997 | Kitt Peak | Spacewatch | · | 900 m | MPC · JPL |
| 513718 | 2012 SE_{66} | — | August 10, 2012 | Kitt Peak | Spacewatch | · | 1.2 km | MPC · JPL |
| 513719 | 2012 SJ_{68} | — | October 4, 2006 | Mount Lemmon | Mount Lemmon Survey | EOS | 2.1 km | MPC · JPL |
| 513720 | 2012 TB_{4} | — | September 27, 2012 | Haleakala | Pan-STARRS 1 | · | 1.6 km | MPC · JPL |
| 513721 | 2012 TM_{10} | — | October 6, 2012 | Mount Lemmon | Mount Lemmon Survey | EUN | 880 m | MPC · JPL |
| 513722 | 2012 TK_{38} | — | October 8, 2012 | Mount Lemmon | Mount Lemmon Survey | · | 1.2 km | MPC · JPL |
| 513723 | 2012 TK_{44} | — | December 18, 2009 | Kitt Peak | Spacewatch | · | 1.1 km | MPC · JPL |
| 513724 | 2012 TB_{92} | — | October 7, 2012 | Haleakala | Pan-STARRS 1 | (5) | 1.1 km | MPC · JPL |
| 513725 | 2012 TT_{117} | — | September 16, 2012 | Kitt Peak | Spacewatch | · | 1 km | MPC · JPL |
| 513726 | 2012 TB_{120} | — | May 24, 2011 | Haleakala | Pan-STARRS 1 | · | 1.2 km | MPC · JPL |
| 513727 | 2012 TB_{136} | — | September 24, 2008 | Mount Lemmon | Mount Lemmon Survey | · | 1.3 km | MPC · JPL |
| 513728 | 2012 TW_{173} | — | October 9, 2008 | Kitt Peak | Spacewatch | MAR | 740 m | MPC · JPL |
| 513729 | 2012 TM_{187} | — | October 9, 2012 | Mount Lemmon | Mount Lemmon Survey | · | 1.6 km | MPC · JPL |
| 513730 | 2012 TS_{208} | — | October 11, 2012 | Kitt Peak | Spacewatch | · | 1.0 km | MPC · JPL |
| 513731 | 2012 TZ_{231} | — | October 1, 2008 | Catalina | CSS | · | 1.1 km | MPC · JPL |
| 513732 | 2012 TY_{244} | — | October 8, 2008 | Kitt Peak | Spacewatch | · | 890 m | MPC · JPL |
| 513733 | 2012 TT_{267} | — | October 8, 2012 | Haleakala | Pan-STARRS 1 | · | 980 m | MPC · JPL |
| 513734 | 2012 TS_{324} | — | October 15, 2012 | Haleakala | Pan-STARRS 1 | L5 | 8.9 km | MPC · JPL |
| 513735 | 2012 TR_{326} | — | November 16, 1998 | Kitt Peak | Spacewatch | · | 2.1 km | MPC · JPL |
| 513736 | 2012 TT_{326} | — | October 7, 2008 | Mount Lemmon | Mount Lemmon Survey | · | 1.3 km | MPC · JPL |
| 513737 | 2012 UT_{1} | — | October 27, 2008 | Mount Lemmon | Mount Lemmon Survey | (5) | 840 m | MPC · JPL |
| 513738 | 2012 UO_{5} | — | September 18, 2012 | Kitt Peak | Spacewatch | · | 1.2 km | MPC · JPL |
| 513739 | 2012 UJ_{53} | — | December 5, 2008 | Mount Lemmon | Mount Lemmon Survey | · | 1.2 km | MPC · JPL |
| 513740 | 2012 UR_{59} | — | October 13, 2012 | Kitt Peak | Spacewatch | · | 1.1 km | MPC · JPL |
| 513741 | 2012 UC_{76} | — | October 18, 2012 | Haleakala | Pan-STARRS 1 | ADE | 1.7 km | MPC · JPL |
| 513742 | 2012 UC_{81} | — | September 9, 2008 | Mount Lemmon | Mount Lemmon Survey | (5) | 1.0 km | MPC · JPL |
| 513743 | 2012 UM_{88} | — | October 21, 2012 | Haleakala | Pan-STARRS 1 | (5) | 1.4 km | MPC · JPL |
| 513744 | 2012 UQ_{88} | — | October 21, 2012 | Haleakala | Pan-STARRS 1 | (5) | 940 m | MPC · JPL |
| 513745 | 2012 UM_{105} | — | December 19, 2004 | Mount Lemmon | Mount Lemmon Survey | · | 1.3 km | MPC · JPL |
| 513746 | 2012 UE_{109} | — | October 26, 2008 | Kitt Peak | Spacewatch | KON | 2.0 km | MPC · JPL |
| 513747 | 2012 US_{116} | — | March 20, 2010 | Mount Lemmon | Mount Lemmon Survey | · | 1.1 km | MPC · JPL |
| 513748 | 2012 UJ_{133} | — | October 18, 2012 | Mount Lemmon | Mount Lemmon Survey | · | 1.4 km | MPC · JPL |
| 513749 | 2012 UV_{163} | — | October 8, 2012 | Kitt Peak | Spacewatch | (5) | 1.3 km | MPC · JPL |
| 513750 | 2012 UV_{166} | — | May 25, 2011 | Mount Lemmon | Mount Lemmon Survey | · | 1.6 km | MPC · JPL |
| 513751 | 2012 UL_{168} | — | October 8, 2012 | Haleakala | Pan-STARRS 1 | · | 1.3 km | MPC · JPL |
| 513752 | 2012 VX_{31} | — | September 15, 2012 | Kitt Peak | Spacewatch | · | 1.0 km | MPC · JPL |
| 513753 | 2012 VN_{109} | — | February 3, 2009 | Mount Lemmon | Mount Lemmon Survey | · | 1.3 km | MPC · JPL |
| 513754 | 2012 VJ_{110} | — | October 21, 2012 | Haleakala | Pan-STARRS 1 | · | 1.3 km | MPC · JPL |
| 513755 | 2012 VQ_{114} | — | November 14, 2012 | Kitt Peak | Spacewatch | WIT | 970 m | MPC · JPL |
| 513756 | 2012 VR_{114} | — | December 22, 2008 | Mount Lemmon | Mount Lemmon Survey | · | 1.5 km | MPC · JPL |
| 513757 | 2012 VW_{114} | — | November 14, 2012 | Kitt Peak | Spacewatch | · | 1.9 km | MPC · JPL |
| 513758 | 2012 WN_{7} | — | October 21, 2012 | Kitt Peak | Spacewatch | MAR | 890 m | MPC · JPL |
| 513759 | 2012 WA_{24} | — | October 21, 2012 | Haleakala | Pan-STARRS 1 | · | 1.4 km | MPC · JPL |
| 513760 | 2012 WW_{29} | — | December 21, 2008 | Catalina | CSS | BAR | 1.2 km | MPC · JPL |
| 513761 | 2012 WJ_{36} | — | November 12, 2007 | Mount Lemmon | Mount Lemmon Survey | · | 2.0 km | MPC · JPL |
| 513762 | 2012 XM_{2} | — | December 22, 2008 | Mount Lemmon | Mount Lemmon Survey | · | 1.4 km | MPC · JPL |
| 513763 | 2012 XP_{27} | — | November 7, 2012 | Kitt Peak | Spacewatch | · | 1.4 km | MPC · JPL |
| 513764 | 2012 XA_{30} | — | November 7, 2012 | Mount Lemmon | Mount Lemmon Survey | · | 1.3 km | MPC · JPL |
| 513765 | 2012 XZ_{44} | — | April 13, 2010 | Mount Lemmon | Mount Lemmon Survey | · | 1.4 km | MPC · JPL |
| 513766 | 2012 XL_{45} | — | August 1, 2011 | Haleakala | Pan-STARRS 1 | · | 1.5 km | MPC · JPL |
| 513767 | 2012 XN_{46} | — | September 9, 2007 | Kitt Peak | Spacewatch | · | 1.6 km | MPC · JPL |
| 513768 | 2012 XP_{66} | — | September 9, 2007 | Kitt Peak | Spacewatch | · | 1.3 km | MPC · JPL |
| 513769 | 2012 XH_{81} | — | September 11, 2007 | Mount Lemmon | Mount Lemmon Survey | MRX | 940 m | MPC · JPL |
| 513770 | 2012 XR_{84} | — | December 30, 2008 | Mount Lemmon | Mount Lemmon Survey | EUN | 1.0 km | MPC · JPL |
| 513771 | 2012 XM_{100} | — | November 26, 2012 | Mount Lemmon | Mount Lemmon Survey | · | 1.7 km | MPC · JPL |
| 513772 | 2012 XP_{116} | — | November 26, 2012 | Mount Lemmon | Mount Lemmon Survey | · | 1.6 km | MPC · JPL |
| 513773 | 2012 YG_{4} | — | December 20, 2012 | Catalina | CSS | EUN | 1.6 km | MPC · JPL |
| 513774 | 2012 YD_{10} | — | November 4, 2007 | Kitt Peak | Spacewatch | HOF | 2.4 km | MPC · JPL |
| 513775 | 2012 YK_{10} | — | December 23, 2012 | Haleakala | Pan-STARRS 1 | · | 1.7 km | MPC · JPL |
| 513776 | 2013 AA_{2} | — | August 23, 2007 | Kitt Peak | Spacewatch | AMO | 650 m | MPC · JPL |
| 513777 | 2013 AQ_{3} | — | January 3, 2013 | Haleakala | Pan-STARRS 1 | HNS | 1.2 km | MPC · JPL |
| 513778 | 2013 AC_{9} | — | December 23, 2012 | Haleakala | Pan-STARRS 1 | · | 1.9 km | MPC · JPL |
| 513779 | 2013 AU_{14} | — | November 11, 2007 | Mount Lemmon | Mount Lemmon Survey | · | 2.9 km | MPC · JPL |
| 513780 | 2013 AN_{36} | — | April 17, 2009 | Mount Lemmon | Mount Lemmon Survey | · | 1.5 km | MPC · JPL |
| 513781 | 2013 AX_{40} | — | September 26, 2011 | Haleakala | Pan-STARRS 1 | NEM | 2.0 km | MPC · JPL |
| 513782 | 2013 AZ_{41} | — | August 19, 2006 | Kitt Peak | Spacewatch | · | 2.0 km | MPC · JPL |
| 513783 | 2013 AO_{70} | — | May 1, 2009 | Mount Lemmon | Mount Lemmon Survey | · | 2.0 km | MPC · JPL |
| 513784 | 2013 AN_{77} | — | April 28, 2009 | Catalina | CSS | · | 2.5 km | MPC · JPL |
| 513785 | 2013 AS_{78} | — | September 18, 2011 | Mount Lemmon | Mount Lemmon Survey | · | 1.6 km | MPC · JPL |
| 513786 | 2013 AY_{124} | — | October 20, 2012 | Mount Lemmon | Mount Lemmon Survey | · | 1.8 km | MPC · JPL |
| 513787 | 2013 BS_{9} | — | February 9, 2008 | Kitt Peak | Spacewatch | · | 2.9 km | MPC · JPL |
| 513788 | 2013 BL_{45} | — | September 27, 2012 | Haleakala | Pan-STARRS 1 | H | 530 m | MPC · JPL |
| 513789 | 2013 BN_{46} | — | December 5, 2007 | Kitt Peak | Spacewatch | DOR | 2.0 km | MPC · JPL |
| 513790 | 2013 BH_{61} | — | January 14, 2002 | Kitt Peak | Spacewatch | · | 3.3 km | MPC · JPL |
| 513791 | 2013 BB_{83} | — | February 29, 2008 | Kitt Peak | Spacewatch | EOS | 1.5 km | MPC · JPL |
| 513792 | 2013 BH_{83} | — | November 2, 2010 | Mount Lemmon | Mount Lemmon Survey | HYG | 2.9 km | MPC · JPL |
| 513793 | 2013 CH_{4} | — | October 2, 2006 | Mount Lemmon | Mount Lemmon Survey | · | 1.3 km | MPC · JPL |
| 513794 | 2013 CN_{39} | — | April 18, 2009 | Mount Lemmon | Mount Lemmon Survey | · | 1.7 km | MPC · JPL |
| 513795 | 2013 CB_{43} | — | December 3, 2007 | Kitt Peak | Spacewatch | · | 1.5 km | MPC · JPL |
| 513796 | 2013 CD_{58} | — | August 28, 2005 | Kitt Peak | Spacewatch | · | 2.7 km | MPC · JPL |
| 513797 | 2013 CJ_{76} | — | December 31, 2007 | Kitt Peak | Spacewatch | · | 1.9 km | MPC · JPL |
| 513798 | 2013 CA_{92} | — | January 17, 2013 | Kitt Peak | Spacewatch | · | 1.7 km | MPC · JPL |
| 513799 | 2013 CP_{92} | — | September 4, 2010 | Mount Lemmon | Mount Lemmon Survey | · | 1.9 km | MPC · JPL |
| 513800 | 2013 CK_{103} | — | February 9, 2013 | Haleakala | Pan-STARRS 1 | GEF | 1.4 km | MPC · JPL |

== 513801–513900 ==
back to top

| Designation | | | Discovery | | | Properties | | Ref |
| Permanent | Provisional | Named after | Date | Site | Discoverer(s) | Category | Diam. | Ref |
|---|---|---|---|---|---|---|---|---|
| 513801 | 2013 CV_{149} | — | March 6, 2008 | Kitt Peak | Spacewatch | · | 1.8 km | MPC · JPL |
| 513802 | 2013 CT_{161} | — | February 14, 2013 | Haleakala | Pan-STARRS 1 | · | 2.3 km | MPC · JPL |
| 513803 | 2013 CO_{163} | — | March 5, 2008 | Kitt Peak | Spacewatch | · | 1.4 km | MPC · JPL |
| 513804 | 2013 CJ_{174} | — | March 10, 2008 | Kitt Peak | Spacewatch | · | 1.3 km | MPC · JPL |
| 513805 | 2013 CU_{174} | — | March 27, 2008 | Kitt Peak | Spacewatch | · | 2.2 km | MPC · JPL |
| 513806 | 2013 CC_{175} | — | February 8, 2013 | Kitt Peak | Spacewatch | EUP | 3.6 km | MPC · JPL |
| 513807 | 2013 CX_{207} | — | February 7, 2013 | Kitt Peak | Spacewatch | EOS | 1.8 km | MPC · JPL |
| 513808 | 2013 CJ_{224} | — | February 6, 2013 | Kitt Peak | Spacewatch | EOS | 1.5 km | MPC · JPL |
| 513809 | 2013 CM_{224} | — | October 1, 2005 | Mount Lemmon | Mount Lemmon Survey | · | 1.5 km | MPC · JPL |
| 513810 | 2013 CA_{225} | — | May 15, 2008 | Mount Lemmon | Mount Lemmon Survey | TIR | 2.6 km | MPC · JPL |
| 513811 | 2013 CE_{225} | — | April 28, 2008 | Mount Lemmon | Mount Lemmon Survey | · | 2.1 km | MPC · JPL |
| 513812 | 2013 DF_{4} | — | September 2, 2011 | Haleakala | Pan-STARRS 1 | · | 1.4 km | MPC · JPL |
| 513813 | 2013 DV_{15} | — | February 28, 2008 | Kitt Peak | Spacewatch | · | 1.7 km | MPC · JPL |
| 513814 | 2013 DN_{16} | — | February 13, 2013 | Haleakala | Pan-STARRS 1 | H | 400 m | MPC · JPL |
| 513815 | 2013 EN_{3} | — | March 3, 2013 | Nogales | M. Schwartz, P. R. Holvorcem | · | 2.8 km | MPC · JPL |
| 513816 | 2013 EV_{3} | — | February 1, 1997 | Kitt Peak | Spacewatch | · | 1.6 km | MPC · JPL |
| 513817 | 2013 EZ_{4} | — | March 4, 2013 | Haleakala | Pan-STARRS 1 | H | 510 m | MPC · JPL |
| 513818 | 2013 EX_{9} | — | March 1, 2008 | Kitt Peak | Spacewatch | · | 1.6 km | MPC · JPL |
| 513819 | 2013 EE_{10} | — | May 3, 2008 | Mount Lemmon | Mount Lemmon Survey | · | 1.7 km | MPC · JPL |
| 513820 | 2013 EE_{15} | — | March 24, 2003 | Kitt Peak | Spacewatch | · | 1.6 km | MPC · JPL |
| 513821 | 2013 EO_{17} | — | March 3, 2013 | Kitt Peak | Spacewatch | · | 3.3 km | MPC · JPL |
| 513822 | 2013 ES_{20} | — | March 4, 1997 | Kitt Peak | Spacewatch | · | 2.6 km | MPC · JPL |
| 513823 | 2013 EB_{21} | — | October 26, 2011 | Haleakala | Pan-STARRS 1 | · | 1.6 km | MPC · JPL |
| 513824 | 2013 ET_{32} | — | February 16, 2013 | Catalina | CSS | H | 510 m | MPC · JPL |
| 513825 | 2013 EC_{35} | — | April 16, 2008 | Mount Lemmon | Mount Lemmon Survey | · | 1.8 km | MPC · JPL |
| 513826 | 2013 EK_{41} | — | August 29, 2006 | Catalina | CSS | H | 510 m | MPC · JPL |
| 513827 | 2013 EB_{52} | — | August 4, 2010 | WISE | WISE | · | 3.6 km | MPC · JPL |
| 513828 | 2013 EX_{82} | — | October 1, 2011 | Mount Lemmon | Mount Lemmon Survey | · | 1.8 km | MPC · JPL |
| 513829 | 2013 EC_{88} | — | May 6, 2008 | Kitt Peak | Spacewatch | · | 1.9 km | MPC · JPL |
| 513830 | 2013 EJ_{91} | — | August 24, 2011 | Haleakala | Pan-STARRS 1 | H | 410 m | MPC · JPL |
| 513831 | 2013 EB_{99} | — | March 28, 2008 | Mount Lemmon | Mount Lemmon Survey | · | 1.7 km | MPC · JPL |
| 513832 | 2013 EC_{102} | — | January 17, 2007 | Kitt Peak | Spacewatch | · | 2.3 km | MPC · JPL |
| 513833 | 2013 EZ_{109} | — | April 15, 2008 | Mount Lemmon | Mount Lemmon Survey | · | 2.4 km | MPC · JPL |
| 513834 | 2013 ET_{154} | — | March 8, 2013 | Haleakala | Pan-STARRS 1 | H | 350 m | MPC · JPL |
| 513835 | 2013 FW | — | September 18, 1998 | Socorro | LINEAR | H | 430 m | MPC · JPL |
| 513836 | 2013 FT_{3} | — | March 5, 2013 | Mount Lemmon | Mount Lemmon Survey | · | 2.5 km | MPC · JPL |
| 513837 | 2013 FC_{4} | — | April 3, 2008 | Kitt Peak | Spacewatch | · | 2.7 km | MPC · JPL |
| 513838 | 2013 FW_{6} | — | March 18, 2013 | Kitt Peak | Spacewatch | · | 2.1 km | MPC · JPL |
| 513839 | 2013 FV_{24} | — | March 13, 2013 | Mount Lemmon | Mount Lemmon Survey | · | 3.1 km | MPC · JPL |
| 513840 | 2013 GY_{4} | — | April 14, 2008 | Mount Lemmon | Mount Lemmon Survey | · | 1.3 km | MPC · JPL |
| 513841 | 2013 GC_{10} | — | January 10, 2007 | Mount Lemmon | Mount Lemmon Survey | · | 2.1 km | MPC · JPL |
| 513842 | 2013 GP_{18} | — | May 6, 2008 | Kitt Peak | Spacewatch | · | 1.8 km | MPC · JPL |
| 513843 | 2013 GC_{23} | — | March 16, 2013 | Catalina | CSS | H | 490 m | MPC · JPL |
| 513844 | 2013 GM_{53} | — | April 10, 2013 | Haleakala | Pan-STARRS 1 | · | 2.6 km | MPC · JPL |
| 513845 | 2013 GD_{57} | — | March 13, 2013 | Kitt Peak | Spacewatch | · | 2.0 km | MPC · JPL |
| 513846 | 2013 GE_{74} | — | April 8, 2008 | Kitt Peak | Spacewatch | · | 2.0 km | MPC · JPL |
| 513847 | 2013 GJ_{74} | — | March 31, 2008 | Mount Lemmon | Mount Lemmon Survey | · | 1.8 km | MPC · JPL |
| 513848 | 2013 GP_{76} | — | October 23, 2004 | Kitt Peak | Spacewatch | · | 3.8 km | MPC · JPL |
| 513849 | 2013 GQ_{77} | — | August 25, 2011 | Siding Spring | SSS | H | 480 m | MPC · JPL |
| 513850 | 2013 GN_{79} | — | February 23, 2013 | Catalina | CSS | H | 480 m | MPC · JPL |
| 513851 | 2013 GM_{80} | — | April 2, 2005 | Catalina | CSS | H | 530 m | MPC · JPL |
| 513852 | 2013 GL_{96} | — | March 7, 2013 | Kitt Peak | Spacewatch | · | 2.2 km | MPC · JPL |
| 513853 | 2013 GX_{97} | — | March 16, 2002 | Kitt Peak | Spacewatch | · | 2.3 km | MPC · JPL |
| 513854 | 2013 GE_{99} | — | October 28, 2005 | Mount Lemmon | Mount Lemmon Survey | · | 2.2 km | MPC · JPL |
| 513855 | 2013 GA_{100} | — | April 11, 2013 | Mount Lemmon | Mount Lemmon Survey | · | 3.0 km | MPC · JPL |
| 513856 | 2013 GS_{107} | — | February 23, 2007 | Kitt Peak | Spacewatch | · | 2.8 km | MPC · JPL |
| 513857 | 2013 GP_{112} | — | December 23, 2012 | Haleakala | Pan-STARRS 1 | · | 2.7 km | MPC · JPL |
| 513858 | 2013 GZ_{132} | — | January 10, 2007 | Mount Lemmon | Mount Lemmon Survey | · | 2.3 km | MPC · JPL |
| 513859 | 2013 GD_{133} | — | October 31, 2010 | Mount Lemmon | Mount Lemmon Survey | HYG | 2.4 km | MPC · JPL |
| 513860 | 2013 GN_{138} | — | December 1, 2003 | Kitt Peak | Spacewatch | H | 500 m | MPC · JPL |
| 513861 | 2013 HY_{14} | — | June 11, 2011 | Haleakala | Pan-STARRS 1 | H | 550 m | MPC · JPL |
| 513862 | 2013 HJ_{16} | — | March 18, 2013 | Kitt Peak | Spacewatch | · | 2.1 km | MPC · JPL |
| 513863 | 2013 HP_{42} | — | March 16, 2007 | Mount Lemmon | Mount Lemmon Survey | · | 2.3 km | MPC · JPL |
| 513864 | 2013 HB_{45} | — | December 4, 2005 | Kitt Peak | Spacewatch | · | 2.4 km | MPC · JPL |
| 513865 | 2013 HQ_{57} | — | October 29, 2010 | Mount Lemmon | Mount Lemmon Survey | EOS | 1.4 km | MPC · JPL |
| 513866 | 2013 HC_{118} | — | October 27, 2005 | Kitt Peak | Spacewatch | · | 2.2 km | MPC · JPL |
| 513867 | 2013 HR_{124} | — | March 10, 2007 | Mount Lemmon | Mount Lemmon Survey | · | 2.0 km | MPC · JPL |
| 513868 | 2013 JU_{7} | — | October 22, 2006 | Siding Spring | SSS | H | 640 m | MPC · JPL |
| 513869 | 2013 JE_{24} | — | April 11, 2013 | Catalina | CSS | T_{j} (2.99) · EUP | 4.5 km | MPC · JPL |
| 513870 | 2013 JG_{27} | — | January 20, 2012 | Haleakala | Pan-STARRS 1 | · | 3.7 km | MPC · JPL |
| 513871 | 2013 JY_{37} | — | April 20, 2013 | Haleakala | Pan-STARRS 1 | H | 450 m | MPC · JPL |
| 513872 | 2013 JZ_{40} | — | February 13, 2012 | Haleakala | Pan-STARRS 1 | · | 3.0 km | MPC · JPL |
| 513873 | 2013 JT_{49} | — | February 23, 2007 | Mount Lemmon | Mount Lemmon Survey | · | 1.9 km | MPC · JPL |
| 513874 | 2013 JY_{52} | — | March 11, 2007 | Kitt Peak | Spacewatch | · | 3.2 km | MPC · JPL |
| 513875 | 2013 JF_{60} | — | April 15, 2013 | Haleakala | Pan-STARRS 1 | · | 3.3 km | MPC · JPL |
| 513876 | 2013 KS_{6} | — | May 31, 2013 | Haleakala | Pan-STARRS 1 | H | 510 m | MPC · JPL |
| 513877 | 2013 KQ_{8} | — | January 2, 2012 | Mount Lemmon | Mount Lemmon Survey | · | 2.6 km | MPC · JPL |
| 513878 | 2013 KK_{11} | — | May 15, 2013 | Haleakala | Pan-STARRS 1 | · | 3.3 km | MPC · JPL |
| 513879 | 2013 KU_{13} | — | January 27, 2012 | Mount Lemmon | Mount Lemmon Survey | · | 2.5 km | MPC · JPL |
| 513880 | 2013 LE_{21} | — | June 1, 2013 | Haleakala | Pan-STARRS 1 | T_{j} (2.93) | 4.5 km | MPC · JPL |
| 513881 | 2013 LC_{29} | — | December 13, 2006 | Kitt Peak | Spacewatch | H | 480 m | MPC · JPL |
| 513882 | 2013 MH_{1} | — | January 27, 2012 | Kitt Peak | Spacewatch | · | 2.5 km | MPC · JPL |
| 513883 | 2013 OW | — | February 28, 2008 | Catalina | CSS | · | 730 m | MPC · JPL |
| 513884 | 2013 OF_{11} | — | June 30, 2013 | Haleakala | Pan-STARRS 1 | · | 1.1 km | MPC · JPL |
| 513885 | 2013 PE_{42} | — | October 11, 2010 | Mount Lemmon | Mount Lemmon Survey | · | 470 m | MPC · JPL |
| 513886 | 2013 RR_{22} | — | January 14, 2008 | Kitt Peak | Spacewatch | · | 570 m | MPC · JPL |
| 513887 | 2013 SJ_{101} | — | September 25, 2013 | Mount Lemmon | Mount Lemmon Survey | · | 830 m | MPC · JPL |
| 513888 | 2013 SL_{101} | — | May 26, 2007 | Mount Lemmon | Mount Lemmon Survey | EUN | 1.3 km | MPC · JPL |
| 513889 | 2013 TS_{24} | — | September 16, 2006 | Siding Spring | SSS | PHO | 1.1 km | MPC · JPL |
| 513890 | 2013 TW_{39} | — | November 28, 1999 | Kitt Peak | Spacewatch | · | 510 m | MPC · JPL |
| 513891 | 2013 TY_{60} | — | August 24, 2012 | Kitt Peak | Spacewatch | L5 | 8.5 km | MPC · JPL |
| 513892 | 2013 TV_{84} | — | August 28, 2006 | Catalina | CSS | · | 580 m | MPC · JPL |
| 513893 | 2013 TX_{91} | — | January 13, 2008 | Kitt Peak | Spacewatch | · | 610 m | MPC · JPL |
| 513894 | 2013 TG_{93} | — | September 14, 2013 | Mount Lemmon | Mount Lemmon Survey | · | 820 m | MPC · JPL |
| 513895 | 2013 TJ_{129} | — | August 14, 2006 | Siding Spring | SSS | · | 700 m | MPC · JPL |
| 513896 | 2013 UJ_{8} | — | September 18, 2006 | Catalina | CSS | · | 700 m | MPC · JPL |
| 513897 | 2013 VJ_{25} | — | April 26, 2008 | Mount Lemmon | Mount Lemmon Survey | · | 730 m | MPC · JPL |
| 513898 | 2013 VK_{25} | — | September 22, 2012 | Mount Lemmon | Mount Lemmon Survey | · | 1.6 km | MPC · JPL |
| 513899 | 2013 WD_{34} | — | September 25, 1995 | Kitt Peak | Spacewatch | · | 740 m | MPC · JPL |
| 513900 | 2013 WP_{91} | — | December 9, 2006 | Kitt Peak | Spacewatch | · | 710 m | MPC · JPL |

== 513901–514000 ==
back to top

| Designation | | | Discovery | | | Properties | | Ref |
| Permanent | Provisional | Named after | Date | Site | Discoverer(s) | Category | Diam. | Ref |
|---|---|---|---|---|---|---|---|---|
| 513901 | 2013 XU_{26} | — | March 14, 2010 | Kitt Peak | Spacewatch | · | 1.4 km | MPC · JPL |
| 513902 | 2013 YQ_{4} | — | December 23, 2013 | Mount Lemmon | Mount Lemmon Survey | · | 790 m | MPC · JPL |
| 513903 | 2013 YP_{14} | — | December 23, 2013 | Mount Lemmon | Mount Lemmon Survey | · | 1.5 km | MPC · JPL |
| 513904 | 2013 YG_{26} | — | July 28, 2009 | Kitt Peak | Spacewatch | · | 1.2 km | MPC · JPL |
| 513905 | 2013 YE_{30} | — | October 27, 2005 | Kitt Peak | Spacewatch | · | 870 m | MPC · JPL |
| 513906 | 2013 YA_{54} | — | January 10, 2007 | Mount Lemmon | Mount Lemmon Survey | · | 860 m | MPC · JPL |
| 513907 | 2013 YU_{63} | — | November 5, 2005 | Catalina | CSS | · | 1.3 km | MPC · JPL |
| 513908 | 2013 YS_{77} | — | December 1, 1994 | Kitt Peak | Spacewatch | · | 1.1 km | MPC · JPL |
| 513909 | 2013 YN_{94} | — | October 25, 2005 | Kitt Peak | Spacewatch | · | 1.0 km | MPC · JPL |
| 513910 | 2013 YX_{115} | — | March 11, 2007 | Kitt Peak | Spacewatch | · | 1.0 km | MPC · JPL |
| 513911 | 2013 YF_{117} | — | April 9, 1999 | Kitt Peak | Spacewatch | MAS | 650 m | MPC · JPL |
| 513912 | 2013 YE_{126} | — | March 23, 2003 | Kitt Peak | Spacewatch | · | 940 m | MPC · JPL |
| 513913 | 2013 YC_{146} | — | September 16, 2009 | Kitt Peak | Spacewatch | · | 820 m | MPC · JPL |
| 513914 | 2014 AH_{25} | — | March 28, 2010 | WISE | WISE | · | 1.8 km | MPC · JPL |
| 513915 | 2014 AY_{35} | — | January 24, 2007 | Mount Lemmon | Mount Lemmon Survey | NYS | 820 m | MPC · JPL |
| 513916 | 2014 AR_{46} | — | December 11, 2013 | Mount Lemmon | Mount Lemmon Survey | AMO | 490 m | MPC · JPL |
| 513917 | 2014 AF_{53} | — | November 9, 2013 | Mount Lemmon | Mount Lemmon Survey | · | 1.2 km | MPC · JPL |
| 513918 | 2014 AX_{56} | — | April 11, 2011 | Mount Lemmon | Mount Lemmon Survey | · | 1.2 km | MPC · JPL |
| 513919 | 2014 AH_{57} | — | September 11, 2004 | Kitt Peak | Spacewatch | · | 920 m | MPC · JPL |
| 513920 | 2014 BY_{16} | — | October 1, 2005 | Mount Lemmon | Mount Lemmon Survey | NYS · fast? | 1.0 km | MPC · JPL |
| 513921 | 2014 BO_{34} | — | January 21, 2014 | Kitt Peak | Spacewatch | NYS | 940 m | MPC · JPL |
| 513922 | 2014 BO_{42} | — | January 25, 2014 | Haleakala | Pan-STARRS 1 | · | 1.6 km | MPC · JPL |
| 513923 | 2014 BO_{58} | — | January 1, 2014 | Mount Lemmon | Mount Lemmon Survey | PHO | 900 m | MPC · JPL |
| 513924 | 2014 BK_{66} | — | January 16, 2010 | Mount Lemmon | Mount Lemmon Survey | · | 1.3 km | MPC · JPL |
| 513925 | 2014 CK_{7} | — | November 30, 2005 | Kitt Peak | Spacewatch | · | 1.1 km | MPC · JPL |
| 513926 | 2014 CA_{12} | — | January 1, 2014 | Mount Lemmon | Mount Lemmon Survey | · | 1.0 km | MPC · JPL |
| 513927 | 2014 CD_{22} | — | January 9, 2014 | Mount Lemmon | Mount Lemmon Survey | JUN | 990 m | MPC · JPL |
| 513928 | 2014 DQ_{4} | — | November 6, 2008 | Mount Lemmon | Mount Lemmon Survey | · | 1.5 km | MPC · JPL |
| 513929 | 2014 DU_{4} | — | April 8, 2010 | XuYi | PMO NEO Survey Program | · | 950 m | MPC · JPL |
| 513930 | 2014 DZ_{19} | — | September 4, 2011 | Haleakala | Pan-STARRS 1 | · | 1.6 km | MPC · JPL |
| 513931 | 2014 DO_{41} | — | August 26, 2012 | Haleakala | Pan-STARRS 1 | · | 1.1 km | MPC · JPL |
| 513932 | 2014 DA_{44} | — | February 26, 2014 | Mount Lemmon | Mount Lemmon Survey | · | 970 m | MPC · JPL |
| 513933 | 2014 DB_{55} | — | April 20, 2006 | Kitt Peak | Spacewatch | · | 1.2 km | MPC · JPL |
| 513934 | 2014 DR_{56} | — | September 22, 2012 | Kitt Peak | Spacewatch | · | 1.1 km | MPC · JPL |
| 513935 | 2014 DL_{60} | — | November 17, 2012 | Mount Lemmon | Mount Lemmon Survey | · | 1.2 km | MPC · JPL |
| 513936 | 2014 DT_{66} | — | August 2, 2011 | Haleakala | Pan-STARRS 1 | · | 1.3 km | MPC · JPL |
| 513937 | 2014 DJ_{76} | — | October 17, 2012 | Mount Lemmon | Mount Lemmon Survey | EUN | 850 m | MPC · JPL |
| 513938 | 2014 DN_{79} | — | February 26, 2014 | Haleakala | Pan-STARRS 1 | HNS | 900 m | MPC · JPL |
| 513939 | 2014 DM_{83} | — | October 8, 2012 | Haleakala | Pan-STARRS 1 | · | 1.1 km | MPC · JPL |
| 513940 | 2014 DP_{87} | — | October 20, 2012 | Haleakala | Pan-STARRS 1 | MAR | 980 m | MPC · JPL |
| 513941 | 2014 DD_{88} | — | September 3, 2008 | Kitt Peak | Spacewatch | · | 850 m | MPC · JPL |
| 513942 | 2014 DR_{96} | — | April 15, 2010 | Mount Lemmon | Mount Lemmon Survey | MIS | 1.8 km | MPC · JPL |
| 513943 | 2014 DC_{105} | — | September 9, 2008 | Mount Lemmon | Mount Lemmon Survey | · | 950 m | MPC · JPL |
| 513944 | 2014 DJ_{107} | — | February 15, 2010 | Mount Lemmon | Mount Lemmon Survey | · | 970 m | MPC · JPL |
| 513945 | 2014 DJ_{110} | — | February 27, 2014 | Kitt Peak | Spacewatch | · | 1.5 km | MPC · JPL |
| 513946 | 2014 DE_{117} | — | November 1, 2008 | Mount Lemmon | Mount Lemmon Survey | · | 1.1 km | MPC · JPL |
| 513947 | 2014 DZ_{123} | — | September 26, 2011 | Mount Lemmon | Mount Lemmon Survey | ADE | 1.8 km | MPC · JPL |
| 513948 | 2014 DZ_{129} | — | October 20, 2012 | Haleakala | Pan-STARRS 1 | · | 1 km | MPC · JPL |
| 513949 | 2014 DB_{139} | — | March 18, 2010 | Mount Lemmon | Mount Lemmon Survey | EUN | 770 m | MPC · JPL |
| 513950 | 2014 DO_{140} | — | May 5, 2010 | Mount Lemmon | Mount Lemmon Survey | · | 2.2 km | MPC · JPL |
| 513951 | 2014 DS_{146} | — | February 26, 2014 | Haleakala | Pan-STARRS 1 | EOS | 1.8 km | MPC · JPL |
| 513952 | 2014 DC_{147} | — | January 13, 2010 | WISE | WISE | · | 2.7 km | MPC · JPL |
| 513953 | 2014 DJ_{147} | — | December 3, 2012 | Mount Lemmon | Mount Lemmon Survey | · | 1.4 km | MPC · JPL |
| 513954 | 2014 DO_{147} | — | October 10, 2007 | Mount Lemmon | Mount Lemmon Survey | · | 1.5 km | MPC · JPL |
| 513955 | 2014 EO_{4} | — | May 13, 2010 | Mount Lemmon | Mount Lemmon Survey | · | 1.4 km | MPC · JPL |
| 513956 | 2014 EM_{43} | — | March 15, 2010 | Kitt Peak | Spacewatch | · | 870 m | MPC · JPL |
| 513957 | 2014 ED_{99} | — | July 26, 2011 | Haleakala | Pan-STARRS 1 | · | 1.3 km | MPC · JPL |
| 513958 | 2014 EG_{123} | — | October 10, 2012 | Mount Lemmon | Mount Lemmon Survey | GEF | 1.2 km | MPC · JPL |
| 513959 | 2014 EF_{170} | — | September 13, 2004 | Kitt Peak | Spacewatch | · | 890 m | MPC · JPL |
| 513960 | 2014 ES_{188} | — | October 2, 2006 | Mount Lemmon | Mount Lemmon Survey | · | 2.9 km | MPC · JPL |
| 513961 | 2014 EB_{194} | — | September 5, 2008 | Kitt Peak | Spacewatch | · | 930 m | MPC · JPL |
| 513962 | 2014 EM_{226} | — | September 22, 2012 | Mount Lemmon | Mount Lemmon Survey | · | 1.2 km | MPC · JPL |
| 513963 | 2014 EO_{248} | — | September 13, 2007 | Mount Lemmon | Mount Lemmon Survey | · | 1.3 km | MPC · JPL |
| 513964 | 2014 FT_{8} | — | January 26, 2014 | Haleakala | Pan-STARRS 1 | · | 1.1 km | MPC · JPL |
| 513965 | 2014 FO_{12} | — | January 16, 2010 | WISE | WISE | · | 3.3 km | MPC · JPL |
| 513966 | 2014 FW_{15} | — | February 26, 2014 | Kitt Peak | Spacewatch | WIT | 900 m | MPC · JPL |
| 513967 | 2014 FJ_{20} | — | August 10, 2007 | Kitt Peak | Spacewatch | EUN | 1.2 km | MPC · JPL |
| 513968 | 2014 FF_{40} | — | February 26, 2014 | Mount Lemmon | Mount Lemmon Survey | · | 1.0 km | MPC · JPL |
| 513969 | 2014 FD_{43} | — | February 25, 2014 | Haleakala | Pan-STARRS 1 | · | 1.7 km | MPC · JPL |
| 513970 | 2014 FZ_{52} | — | December 2, 2008 | Kitt Peak | Spacewatch | · | 960 m | MPC · JPL |
| 513971 | 2014 FH_{55} | — | October 18, 2011 | Mount Lemmon | Mount Lemmon Survey | · | 1.5 km | MPC · JPL |
| 513972 | 2014 FU_{56} | — | February 26, 2014 | Haleakala | Pan-STARRS 1 | · | 1.2 km | MPC · JPL |
| 513973 | 2014 FN_{67} | — | November 3, 2008 | Mount Lemmon | Mount Lemmon Survey | · | 1.1 km | MPC · JPL |
| 513974 | 2014 FA_{73} | — | March 10, 2005 | Mount Lemmon | Mount Lemmon Survey | · | 1.4 km | MPC · JPL |
| 513975 | 2014 GO_{6} | — | April 1, 2014 | Mount Lemmon | Mount Lemmon Survey | LEO | 1.4 km | MPC · JPL |
| 513976 | 2014 GG_{14} | — | March 12, 2005 | Kitt Peak | Spacewatch | · | 1.2 km | MPC · JPL |
| 513977 | 2014 GA_{16} | — | February 28, 2014 | Haleakala | Pan-STARRS 1 | · | 1.0 km | MPC · JPL |
| 513978 | 2014 GT_{25} | — | February 9, 2014 | Mount Lemmon | Mount Lemmon Survey | · | 2.0 km | MPC · JPL |
| 513979 | 2014 GC_{43} | — | February 21, 2009 | Kitt Peak | Spacewatch | · | 1.2 km | MPC · JPL |
| 513980 | 2014 GH_{44} | — | May 5, 2010 | Catalina | CSS | · | 1.2 km | MPC · JPL |
| 513981 | 2014 GH_{47} | — | April 9, 2010 | Mount Lemmon | Mount Lemmon Survey | · | 1.2 km | MPC · JPL |
| 513982 | 2014 GY_{56} | — | February 6, 2013 | Kitt Peak | Spacewatch | EOS | 2.0 km | MPC · JPL |
| 513983 | 2014 GG_{57} | — | November 19, 2007 | Mount Lemmon | Mount Lemmon Survey | WIT | 960 m | MPC · JPL |
| 513984 | 2014 GH_{57} | — | April 5, 2014 | Haleakala | Pan-STARRS 1 | · | 1.7 km | MPC · JPL |
| 513985 | 2014 GN_{57} | — | November 1, 2007 | Mount Lemmon | Mount Lemmon Survey | · | 1.5 km | MPC · JPL |
| 513986 | 2014 GD_{58} | — | February 19, 2009 | Kitt Peak | Spacewatch | · | 1.6 km | MPC · JPL |
| 513987 | 2014 HN_{1} | — | February 28, 2014 | Haleakala | Pan-STARRS 1 | HNS | 1.2 km | MPC · JPL |
| 513988 | 2014 HY_{10} | — | October 18, 2012 | Haleakala | Pan-STARRS 1 | · | 1.1 km | MPC · JPL |
| 513989 | 2014 HV_{31} | — | March 25, 2014 | Kitt Peak | Spacewatch | AGN | 870 m | MPC · JPL |
| 513990 | 2014 HZ_{42} | — | April 5, 2014 | Haleakala | Pan-STARRS 1 | EUN | 1.0 km | MPC · JPL |
| 513991 | 2014 HN_{48} | — | October 22, 2012 | Haleakala | Pan-STARRS 1 | · | 1.2 km | MPC · JPL |
| 513992 | 2014 HK_{54} | — | April 6, 2005 | Kitt Peak | Spacewatch | · | 1.5 km | MPC · JPL |
| 513993 | 2014 HZ_{82} | — | January 31, 2009 | Mount Lemmon | Mount Lemmon Survey | AEO | 1 km | MPC · JPL |
| 513994 | 2014 HR_{89} | — | September 2, 2011 | Haleakala | Pan-STARRS 1 | · | 1.5 km | MPC · JPL |
| 513995 | 2014 HP_{127} | — | November 3, 2007 | Kitt Peak | Spacewatch | · | 1.6 km | MPC · JPL |
| 513996 | 2014 HY_{134} | — | April 5, 2014 | Haleakala | Pan-STARRS 1 | · | 1.5 km | MPC · JPL |
| 513997 | 2014 HK_{144} | — | February 27, 2014 | Kitt Peak | Spacewatch | · | 1.3 km | MPC · JPL |
| 513998 | 2014 HK_{145} | — | October 9, 2007 | Mount Lemmon | Mount Lemmon Survey | EUN | 1.0 km | MPC · JPL |
| 513999 | 2014 HF_{153} | — | September 23, 2011 | Kitt Peak | Spacewatch | · | 1.7 km | MPC · JPL |
| 514000 | 2014 HM_{153} | — | October 22, 2006 | Kitt Peak | Spacewatch | · | 1.5 km | MPC · JPL |

back to top

== Meaning of names ==
As minor planet discoveries are confirmed, they are given a permanent number by the IAU's Minor Planet Center (MPC), and the discoverers can then submit names for them, following the IAU's naming conventions. The list below concerns those minor planets in the specified number-range that have received names, and explains the meanings of those names.

Official naming citations of newly named small Solar System bodies are approved and published in a bulletin by IAU's Working Group for Small Bodies Nomenclature (WGSBN). Before May 2021, citations were published in MPC's Minor Planet Circulars for many decades. Recent citations can also be found on the JPL Small-Body Database (SBDB). Until his death in 2016, German astronomer Lutz D. Schmadel compiled these citations into the Dictionary of Minor Planet Names (DMP) and regularly updated the collection.

Based on Paul Herget's The Names of the Minor Planets, Schmadel also researched the unclear origin of numerous asteroids, most of which had been named prior to World War II. This article incorporates text from this source, which is in the public domain: SBDB New namings may only be added to this list below after official publication as the preannouncement of names is condemned. The WGSBN publishes a comprehensive guideline for the naming rules of non-cometary small Solar System bodies.

| Named minor planet | Provisional | This minor planet was named for... | Ref · Catalog |
|---|---|---|---|
| 513340 Xianshiyou | 2007 PC_{49} | Xianshiyou, the Chinese pronunciation of the acronym for Xi'an Shiyou University. | IAU · 513340 |
| 513557 NIGPAS | 2010 PE_{74} | The Nanjing Institute of Geology and Palaeontology, Chinese Academy of Sciences (NIGPAS) was founded in 1951. | IAU · 513557 |
