= Cobleskill =

Cobleskill may refer to:

== United States ==
- Cobleskill (village), New York
- Cobleskill (town), New York
- Cobleskill Creek, New York
- Cobleskill Historic District, a national historic district located at Cobleskill in Schoharie County, New York
- SUNY Cobleskill

== See also ==
- Cobleskill Times Journal
