= List of 2018 Women's March locations =

This is an incomplete list of 2018 Women's March events - rallies, marches, community activities, and voter registration drives - that took place in cities, towns and villages on January 20 and January 21, 2018 (the latter as noted). By January 21, there were around 250 site-specific events reported.

== United States ==
Listed below are over 380 marches in the U.S. in support of the 2018 Women's March. Larger crowds gathered in cities such as New York, Washington, Los Angeles, Dallas, Philadelphia, Chicago, San Francisco, and Atlanta. Speakers at the January 20, 2018 rallies called for more women to run for office.

- AL
- AK
- AZ
- AR
- CA
- CO
- CT
- DC
- DE
- FL
- GA
- HI
- ID
- IL
- IN
- IA
- KS
- KY
- LA
- ME
- MD
- MA
- MI
- MN
- MS
- MO
- MT
- NE
- NV
- NH
- NJ
- NM
- NY
- NC
- ND
- OH
- OK
- OR
- PA
- RI
- SC
- SD
- TN
- TX
- UT
- VT
- VA
- WA
- WV
- WI
- WY

State	Date	Cities	Photo	Approximate attendance	Notes
District of Columbia	Jan. 20	Washington, D.C.		10,000+	In Washington, D.C., thousands gathered at the Reflecting Pool at the Lincoln Memorial and marched to the White House. The crowd was smaller than the 2017 rally, which according to WUSA9 had almost 500,000 participants. Just ahead of the start of the rally, over 12,000 people had RSVP'd they were attending on the event's Facebook page, with another 21,000 stating they were interested. U.S. Sen Kirsten Gillibrand (D-NY), one of Trump's targets for Twitter attacks, addressed the crowd: "It is women who are holding our democracy together in these dangerous times." Also speaking, House Minority Leader Nancy Pelosi (D-CA), Sen. Tim Kaine (D-VA), Sen Richard Blumenthal (D-CT), DNC Chair Tom Perez, & Toni Van Pelt, president of the National Organization for Women.
Alabama	Jan. 20 & 22	Birmingham		~58	(Jan. 20) "Celebration of Women" event scheduled from 1-4 p.m. at Rogue Tavern; (Jan 22) Roe v Wade: 45 Years of Choice; event planned at The J Clyde
Alabama		Dothan			"Power to the Polls Wiregrass!" Event held at KBC on Foster for voter registration
Alabama		Huntsville		200+	A march was held at Big Springs Park
Alabama		Mentone		60+	Plowshares Bistro & Artisan Market - Mentone Arts and Cultural Center (formerly Kamama gallery)
Alabama		Mobile		few hundred	The South Alabama Women's March Anniversary Event took place at the Public Safety Memorial Park. Participants were particularly fired up after the 2017 special US Senate election of Doug Jones. Among the six speakers at the rally were state Rep. Barbara Drummond (D-Mobile), the only current elected official, and Tabitha Isner, a Democratic contender for Alabama's 2nd congressional district, currently held by Republican Rep. Martha Roby.
Alabama		Montgomery		thousands	Court Square fountain, Dexter Ave - Alabama State Capitol; event hosted by Southern Poverty Law Center
Alabama	Jan. 21	Tuscaloosa			Tuscaloosa Moms Demand Action; Training Room, The Gateway at Alberta
Alaska		Anchorage		3,000+	In Anchorage, 3,000 people marched to empower women and to protest President Donald Trump's policies. The Alaska March for Women 2018 began at the Delaney Park Strip and continued along 9th Avenue.
Alaska		Bethel		several dozen	
Alaska		Cordova		87	About 87 men, women and children gathered in the center of Main Street for the Women's March in Cordova.
Alaska		Fairbanks		400	Under the theme of "Power to the Polls", speakers opposed oil drilling in the Arctic National Wildlife Refuge and gerrymandered legislative districts. Signs included, "love Trumps hate".
Alaska		Gustavus		90	Gustavus Airport. About 90 of the community's 400 residents turned out for the march
Alaska		Homer		650-700	Pioneer Avenue
Alaska		Juneau		1,030+	in front of State Capitol - Marine Park.
Alaska		Ketchikan		150	event planned at 131 Front Street
Alaska		Kodiak		140	Kodiak High School
Alaska		Nome		40	people in fur-lined parkas marched down Front Street
Alaska		Petersburg		100+	Petersburg's Women March, a.k.a. March for Love
Alaska		Seward		65	About 65 women, men, children, and about 10 sled dogs participated in the march organized by Suzi Towsley and Fey Herold.
Alaska		Sitka		300	Organizer Kathy Ingallinera thanked everyone for coming out
Alaska		Soldotna		75	Soldotna Public Library, Kenai Spur Highway
Alaska	Jan. 21	Unalaska		55	Eagle's View Elementary School
Alaska		Valdez		24	event planned at corner of Fairbanks & Hazelet
Alaska		Wrangell		15	5-minute march through the small island of Wrangell, AK
Arizona	Jan. 21	Ajo		11	event planned at Ajo Plaza in Ajo Plaza
Arizona		Casa Grande		~100	Pinal County Women's March, Peart Park. Former congresswoman Gabby Giffords & her husband Mark Kelly spoke at the event. US Rep. Tom O'Halleran (D-Sedona) was also scheduled to speak but got held back by the government shutdown.
Arizona		Flagstaff		1,000+	Flagstaff City Hall; hundreds marched through snow.
Arizona		Green Valley		450-500	Alliance4Action (A4A) Women's March Rally; corner of Esperanza Blvd & La Canada Drive
Arizona		Nogales		100+	International Street
Arizona		Payson		2	event held at 513 S. Beeline Highway
Arizona	Jan. 21	Phoenix		25,000	Arizona State Capitol; Arizona Capitol Museum. The Phoenix march came one day after 4,500 people gathered at the Capitol for the Arizona for Life March and Rally.
Arizona		Prescott		1,100 - 1,400	Yavapai County Courthouse
Arizona		Sedona		500	Creative Gateways Gallery - Vino di Sedona; hundreds marched through rain.
Arizona		Tucson		200+	Instead of a march, a candlelight vigil was held in Amory Park.
Arkansas		Fayetteville		1,000 - 3,000	Fayetteville Town Center - Fayetteville Library (original end point was Washington County Courthouse, but changed because of higher than expected turnout)
Arkansas		Little Rock		hundreds	The Arkansas Times reported big crowds at the State Capitol Building in Little Rock.
California		Alameda		dozens	Park St & Santa Clara Ave
California		Avalon		45-47	Wrigley Stage
California		Bakersfield		3,000	The first Kern County Women's March started and ended at Mill Creek Park off of 21st Street
California		Bishop		700	The 2nd Eastern Sierra Women's March was held, once again, at Bishop City Park.
California		Burbank		nearly 1,000	A crowd of 600 people (police estimate) marched along the Chandler Bikeway path, from Mariposa Street to Hollywood Way and back (3 miles). More joined in along the walk, bringing the total closer to 1,000. Vice Mayor of Burbank Emily Gabel-Luddy was one of several notable speakers at the event.
California		Carpinteria		400	Seal Plaza, Linden Ave - Carpinteria State Beach; the closure of a major traffic artery along the California coast did not stop the marchers from publicly promoting gender equality
California		Chico		5,000	Downtown Chico Plaza
California		Crescent City		250-400	Crescent Elk Middle School
California		Eureka		4,300 - 5,000	Madaket Plaza at the top of C Street Market Square - boardwalk march to F Street Plaza
California		Fairfax		100+	Fairfax parkade - San Anselmo hub
California		Fort Bragg		1,000+	Women's March Mendocino Coast 2018 at Bainbridge Park (filled almost to capacity); Mayor Lindy Peters was present.
California		Fresno		thousands	River Park Shopping Center; Nees and Blackstone
California		Gualala		14	event held at Gualala Hotel Parking Lot
California		Hemet		dozens	Democratic Headquarters - Hemet City Hall parking lot
California		Idyllwild		100+	Idyllwild Monument
California		Jenner			event planned at Timber Cove Landing
California		Kings Beach		750	outdoor plaza of North Tahoe Event Center
California		Los Angeles		600,000	According to Los Angeles Mayor Eric Garcetti, about 600,000 marched in Los Angeles, from Pershing Square to Grand Park and the City Hall on the morning of January 20, calling for equal rights for women in a rally that reflected the rise of the #MeToo and #TimesUp" movements. From 9 a.m. to 4 p.m., they marched to end violence, and to protect the rights of women, workers, people with disabilities, immigrants, indigenous peoples, and environmental and civil rights.
California		Modesto		1,200	Corner of Briggsmore and McHenry; attendance up from about 1,000 in 2017. People marched down McHenry Ave to a rally at Graceada Park.
California		Napa		3,000 - 4,000	An estimated 3000 to 4000 people marched from city hall to the Napa Valley Expo, for a rally addressed by local elected officials and a DACA recipient.
California		Nevada City		200	Broad Street overpass
California		Oakhurst		200+	corner of Highway 41 and Road 426
California		Oakland		40,000 - 70,000	After a rally at Lake Merritt Amphitheater, a peaceful march in downtown Oakland started at 14th Street & Lake Merritt and continued to Frank H. Ogawa Plaza. Some women wore the red robes and headdresses from The Handmaid's Tale.
California		Pacifica		1,000	march along Pacifica Coast Highway, starting at Linda Mar Beach
California		Palm Springs		1,000+	Frances Stevens Park. S Palm Canyon Drive - Wellwood Library. Recently elected Palm Springs Councilwoman Lisa Middleton, the first transgender city representative in California, emceed the event.
California		Quincy		150	Plumas County Court House
California	Jan. 21	Redding		700+	Civic Center Plaza - Redding City Hall & back
California		Redondo Beach		1,000 - 1,500	In front of Ruby's Diner; organized by Progressive Parents South Bay
California		Ridgecrest		100+	Petroglyph Park; organized by Ridgecrest United
California		Riverside		3,000 - 6,000	Historic Riverside Courthouse; 2018 Inland Empire Women's March. Riverside police said that about 3,000 were there; research physicist Ann Heinson of Rise Up California said her analysis showed about 6,000
California		Sacramento		36,000	Southside Park; the numbers rose well above 2017's attendance of 20,000
California		San Diego		37,000	Waterfront Park. Because of its proximity to the Mexico – United States border, San Diego is a "binational", multicultural city. 2018 Women's March director Monica Boyle acknowledged the unseated land of the Kumeyaay Nation, where the rally took place. Though San Diego Police Department officials estimated about 37,000 people attended today's march, Boyle said the crowd at this year's march was even bigger than in 2017 (30,000 - 40,000).
California		San Francisco		80,000	noon rally at the Civic Center Plaza, followed by a march down Market Street to the Embarcadero at 2pm. Speakers included Aimee Allison, president of Democracy in Color; Brittany Packnett, Ferguson, MO activist; San Francisco supervisors Hillary Ronen & Sandra Lee Fewer
California		San Jose		20,000	San Jose City Hall. Organizers of the San Jose march focused on encouraging people to become active in politics and to register to vote.
California		San Luis Obispo		4,000	Mission Plaza
California		San Marcos		3,000 - 4,000	Palomar College
California		Santa Ana		20,000	Six Native American women wearing traditional clothing led the Orange County Women's March from Flower Street and Civic Center Drive up Main Street. Themes of the march included "MeToo" and "TimesUp" but also focused on issues, such as "immigrant, worker and disability rights, and the environment." Some demonstrators in Santa Ana danced to songs by Cyndi Lauper and Beyoncé and chanted: "When we fight we win!"
California		Santa Barbara		3,500	A rally was held at De La Guerra Plaza, but the march was postponed to International Women's Day (March 10) as all local emergency personnel had been strained due to a recent mudslide in Montecito.
California		Santa Cruz		30,000+	Locust St & Pacific Ave - Louden Nelson Community Center.
California		Santa Rosa		2,000+	Old Courthouse Square
California		Seaside		3,000	CSU Monterey Bay (Otter Soccer Complex as start & end of march)
California		Sebastopol		several hundred	Sebastopol Town Plaza
California		Sonoma		2,000+	Sonoma Plaza
California		South Lake Tahoe		400	Tahoe Truckee Women's March; 400 people marched along U.S. 50 from Stateline, NV to Lakeview Commons. South Lake Tahoe Mayor Wendy David spoke to the marchers.
California		Susanville		112+	Residents from Lassen and Plumas counties marched along Main St from Roop's Fort to Walgreens and back, in part honoring the recently deceased Zellamae Miles, community member and great-granddaughter of Susanville founder Isaac Roop.
California		Ukiah		hundreds	Alex Thomas Plaza
California		Vallejo		140	While some groups of people protested in Vallejo, others boarded buses for marches in Sacramento, Oakland and San Francisco.
California		Ventura		1,500	"Ventura County Rising" event planned at Plaza Park
California		Visalia		1,000	College of the Sequoias - march along Mooney Blvd. Over 900 people said they were interested in the event posted on Facebook.
California		Walnut Creek		10,000+	Civic Park
Colorado		Aspen		dozens	Women's Ski & March took place, respectively, on Aspen Mountain & Paepcke Park.
Colorado		Broomfield		400	Broomfield Library Amphitheater
Colorado		Canon City		4	event planned at 628 Main St
Colorado		Carbondale		500	The Goat & Kitchen Bar - Highway 133 (Crystal River Trail)
Colorado	Jan. 21	Colorado Springs		1,000+	Demonstrators gathered in snow and frigid temperatures at All Souls Unitarian Universalist Church, and marched south on Tejon St, pausing at City Hall and Acacia Park
Colorado		Cortez		300+	Cortez City Park; organized by the Montezuma Alliance for Unity. Cortez Mayor Karen Sheek spoke at the rally.
Colorado		Creede		1	Creede Women's March 2018 planned; Kip's – Arp's
Colorado	Jan. 21	Crested Butte		300+	Women's Ski March planned at Red Lady Express / 4-Way Stop, Elk Street; hosted by Gunnison Valley Democrats
Colorado		Denver		50,000+	Civic Center Park - People of "all ages, races and genders" marched in solidarity to support women's equality, racial minorities, LGBTQ, climate science, health care and heading to the polls. This year, organizers in their city permit application anticipated as many as 200,000 participants (twice the number from 2017), but, according to a crowd estimation tool, the march drew closer to 50,000.
Colorado		Durango		600+	march along Main Ave from Rotary Park to the Durango Public Library
Colorado		Grand Junction		thousands	Lincoln Park - Old Mesa County Courthouse. There were so many people that the Grand Junction Police Department had to shut down the street outside of City Hall.
Colorado		Greeley		150	Weld County Courthouse - gazebo at Lincoln Park. About 150 people showed up to Greeley's first women's march Saturday morning in downtown Greeley.
Colorado		Gunnison		200+	Legion Park
Colorado		Pueblo		1,000	Old Pueblo Courthouse. 500–1,000 people were expected
Colorado		Salida		250	Honk and Wave visibility event; Centennial Park (by the Aquatic Center) - Soulcraft
Colorado	Jan. 21	Steamboat Springs		500	Bud Werner Memorial Library - Routt County Courthouse lawn
Colorado		Telluride		70-80	march down Colorado Ave
Colorado		Trinidad		75	The Trinidad Rally for Love, Equality, Justice and Peace took place at Santa Fe Trail & Main Street
Colorado		Vail			event planned at Vail Village Transportation Center
Connecticut		East Haddam		400+	Two Wrasslin' Cats; Together We Rise CT (TWRCT)
Connecticut		Hartford		10,000+	The Hartford march drew about 10,000 participants. Lt. Gov Nancy Wyman, Rep Elizabeth Esty & Hartford Mayor Luke Bronin addressed the rally.
Connecticut		Kent		60	Kent Town Hall - Civil War Monument
Connecticut		Mystic		50-75	Rise Up Mystic held a rally near the John Kelley Statue
Connecticut		Salisbury		250	Salisbury Green - Town Hall
Delaware	Jan. 21	Lewes		200+	Women's March Sussex planned for 1 p.m. at the Lewes Public Library
Delaware		Newark		hundreds	Unitarian Universalist Fellowship of Newark
Florida	Jan. 21	Bokeelia		dozen+	The Pine Island ROAR Rally was held at Fritts Park
Florida	Jan. 20 & 21	Gainesville		500+	(Jan 20) 50 people gathered near the Eternal Flame monument and walked across the midtown pedestrian bridge (Jan 21) 450 people met on Bo Diddley Community Plaza, and marched down West University Ave to Southwest 13th St and back.
Florida	Jan. 21	Jacksonville		1,000	Women's March Day of Action, Jacksonville Landing
Florida		Melbourne		thousands	Eau Gallie Causeway; Brevard Women's March
Florida	Jan. 21	Miami		1,000 - 2,500	Mana Wynwood Convention Center; Carrie Feit, president of Women's March Miami, said the decision to forgo marching and just hold a rally is encapsulated in Women's March Florida 2018 slogan: "In 2017 we marched! In 2018 we act!" Speakers included two Democratic candidates for governor: Tallahassee Mayor Andrew Gillum and former US Rep Gwen Graham. US Rep Lois Frankel also spoke.
Florida		Naples		1,300	Cambier Park
Florida	Jan. 21	Orlando		10,000	Lake Eola Park - Walt Disney Amphitheater. The rally was a part of Women's March Florida's statewide "Day of Action," which also gathered donations for hurricane relief for Puerto Rico, the U.S. Virgin Islands and the Florida Keys. A handful of men from the Proud Boys showed up to clash with the protesters, and were quickly escorted out by Orlando police. State Rep. Amy Mercado (D-Orlando) addressed the crowd, as did Sheena Meade, a former Florida House candidate and speaker from Orlando's first women's march, who lamented, on both occasions, the lack of diversity in an audience of mostly white women.
Florida		Panama City		hundreds	McKenzie Park
Florida		Pensacola		few hundred	A community rally was organized at Plaza De Luna in downtown Pensacola Saturday to walk in solidarity with the Women's March on Washington. Organizers criticized the idea of "pussyhats" over perceptions that it excluded transgender women and women of color.
Florida	Jan. 20 & 21	Sarasota		10,000	(Jan. 20) At least 10,000 people (perhaps even more than 2017's attendance of 12,000) gathered at the Unconditional Surrender Statue. (Jan. 21) A second protest march was slated for 1 pm at Five Points Park.
Florida	Jan. 21	St. Petersburg		5,000	Williams Park; St. Petersburg Mayor Rick Kriseman was present.
Florida		Sebring		8	march along US-27 between Hammock Rd to Sebring Parkway - rally at Sebring Women's Club
Florida		Tallahassee		450	Standing Together; steps of the Old Capitol
Florida		Vero Beach		~33	Merrill P. Barber Bridge
Florida		The Villages		400-500	Lake Sumter Landing
Florida		West Palm Beach		300+	In Palm Beach, Florida, home to President Donald Trump's Mar-a-Lago estate, several hundred people gathered carrying anti-Trump signs, preventing Trump from traveling there as he initially planned. About two miles away, a far different group of about 50 Trump supporters gathered at the intersection of Southern Boulevard and South Flagler Drive.
(Georgia (U.S. state)) Georgia		Athens		200	Topics included Donald Trump, women's rights and Planned Parenthood.
(Georgia (U.S. state)) Georgia		Atlanta		thousands	At 11:30 am, 200 people marched from Woodruff Park around the 1.75-mile government loop. At noon, participants went to the Georgia Alliance for Social Justice's "Power to the Polls" rally at The Bakery on Warner Street. Organizers expected between 2,000 and 5,000 people; though the overall turnout was nowhere near the 2017 tally of 60,000, people were no less energized to get out the vote. Speaking at the rally were Women's March co-chairs Tamika Mallory and Linda Sarsour, actress Alyssa Milano, Georgia Democratic gubernatorial candidate Stacey Abrams, and Planned Parenthood Southwest CEO Staci Fox. US Reps John Lewis & Hank Johnson, who were held back in D.C. during the government shutdown, stepped out of the House Chamber long enough to address the rally through a phone call.
(Georgia (U.S. state)) Georgia	Jan. 20 & 21	Savannah		500+	(Jan 20) 500 people gathered at Wright Square, including former State Rep. Stacey Evans, another female candidate for governor of Georgia / (Jan 21) anniversary celebration of the 2017 Savannah Women's March took place at the Savannah Film Company.
(Georgia (U.S. state)) Georgia		Statesboro		200	March from Bulloch County Annex to Stateboro Courthouse
Hawaii		Hilo		1,000+	Queen Liliuʻokalani Gardens - Moʻoheau Bandstand. The big guest speaker was Teresa Shook, the Maui grandmother credited with beginning the whole Women's March movement.
Hawaii		Honolulu (Oahu)		thousands	Hawaii State Capitol
Hawaii	Jan. 21	Kailua-Kona		thousands	Hale Halawai O Halualoa. Organizers locally weren't sure on Sunday, but the crowd looked to be near Kona's 2017 turnout of 3,800.
Hawaii		Kauai		several hundred	intersection of Ahukini Road and Kapule Highway
Hawaii		Maui		3,500 - 5,000	Thousands attended the peaceful march held at University of Hawaii Maui College campus in Kahului. 100 marchers were met by three loud counterprotesters w/ a bullhorn, denouncing feminist issues.
Hawaii		Molokai		10	Kaunakakai Library
Idaho	Jan. 21	Boise		3,000	Idaho State Capitol Building
Idaho		Idaho Falls		hundreds	Idaho Falls' second annual Power to the Polls Women's March began at the Museum of Idaho, where Mayor Rebecca Casper spoke to a crowd of hundreds. Afterwards, people marched to Library Plaza on Broadway, then headed to the end of Memorial in front of the offices of US Rep Mike Simpson and Sen. Mike Crapo.
Idaho		Ketchum		600	Town Square
Idaho		Sandpoint		951	North Idaho Women's March was held at Sandpoint Middle School. The event's keynote speaker was US Rep Paulette Jordan, who in Dec 2017 had announced her run for governor of Idaho, hoping to serve as the first Native American woman in such office.
Idaho	Jan. 21	Twin Falls			event planned at Twin Falls Family Courthouse
Illinois		Bloomington		dozens	trip planned for Chicago's 2018 march
Illinois		Carbondale		1,000	Southern Illinois Women's March attracted hundreds at Carbondale Civic Center. March organizer Liz Hunter said the turnout surpassed her expectations, and thought there might have been more than 1,000 marchers
Illinois		Chicago		300,000	Thousands of mostly female marchers gathered once again in Grant Park, with many carrying protest signs with slogans such as "Strong women raising strong women."
Illinois		East Peoria		500 - 600+	Riverfront Park
Illinois		Galesburg		34	Knox County Courthouse
Illinois		Kankakee		200	Kankakee County Courthouse
Illinois		Rock Island		300+	Schwiebert Riverfront Park - Rock Island County Clerk's Office
Illinois		Rockford		thousands	Rockford City Market - Second First Church
Illinois		Springfield		500 - 1,000	Rally held at the Old State Capitol
Illinois	Jan. 21	Wheaton (was Naperville)			The Women's March Naperville 2018, originally set for Sunday, was officially canceled in favor of rolling the event into the 2018 Chicago march. However, a Facebook event remained online, with 12 people marked as "going" and 34 "interested" as of Saturday afternoon. Meanwhile, in lieu of Naperville's Sunday march, a candidate meet-and-great was scheduled in the nearby city of Wheaton, at Panera Bread off of Naperville Rd.
Indiana		Bloomington		200	Bloomington Resistance March gathered at the Monroe County Courthouse
Indiana	Jan. 21	Evansville		hundreds	University of Evansville Campus
Indiana	Jan. 21	Fort Wayne		500	Allen County Courthouse. Courtney Tritch, a Democratic candidate for the U.S. representative seat including the Fort Wayne area, asked those present to make 2018 the Year of the Woman.
Indiana		Indianapolis		3,500 - 4,000	American Legion Mall - Indiana State Capitol Building (by way of Monument Circle)
Indiana		Madison		100	The Ohio Valley Indivisible Power to the Polls march took place along Main St.
Iowa		Bettendorf			USW Local 105
Iowa		Decorah		750	Mary Christopher Park - Winneshiek County Courthouse
Iowa		Des Moines		6,000 - 10,000	Iowa State Capitol. "If You Can't Hear Our Voice, Hear Our Vote" State Representative Liz Bennett spoke
Iowa		Dubuque		100+	Washington Park Gazebo. Iowa House candidate Lindsay James spoke at the rally.
Iowa		Iowa City		1,000+	Iowa City Pedestrian Mall
Iowa		Lamoni		50+	rally held at The Coliseum
Kansas		Lawrence		1,500 - 2,500	South Park - City Hall. Many people came here for the lack of an event in Kansas City, KS (where organizers from 2017 said they were focused on getting women elected in office). Vice Mayor Lisa Larsen was present.
Kansas		Pittsburg		200	Russ Hall, PSU - Pritchett Pavilion at 2nd and Broadway; event hosted by Southeast Kansas chapter of the National Organization for Women (SEK NOW)
Kansas	Jan. 21	Topeka		400	Kansas State Capitol. Speakers included State Sens. Laura Kelly & Marci Francisco, who were respectively running for Kansas governor and Secretary of State.
Kansas		Wichita		500	Women's March on Air Capital at City Hall
Kentucky		Lexington		2,000+	Lexington Women's March 2018 at Robert F. Stephens Courthouse Plaza. Kentucky Secretary of State Alison Lundergan Grimes spoke
Kentucky	Jan. 21	Louisville		5,000+	Muhammad Ali Center. "We can change the world but we have got to be together" - Urban League President and CEO Sadiqa Reynolds
Kentucky		Owensboro		dozens	Dozens of people met at the Owensboro riverfront to march together
Kentucky	Jan. 21	Paducah		~100	Robert Cherry Civic Center. Paducah's first female mayor, Brandi Harless, joined the celebration
Kentucky		Pikeville		80+	Pikeville City Park
Louisiana		New Orleans		10,000 - 15,000	The march, which began and ended in Duncan Plaza, stretching for a half-mile-plus loop through the French Quarter, was the largest single protest in the history of New Orleans (breaking the city's 2017 record). Featured speaker, LaToya Cantrell, the first female mayor-elect of New Orleans (who would take office in May 2018), said, "We walked through the streets of New Orleans demanding that the rights of women be upheld to the highest level."
Louisiana		Shreveport		800+	Caddo Parish Courthouse
Maine		Augusta		3,000 - 4,500	Maine Women's March 2.0 at Maine State House
Maine		Bangor		1,000+	Mid & Northern Maine Women's March Year 2; Pierce Memorial Park - Unitarian Universalist Church on Park Street
Maine		Bar Harbor		~100	Bar Harbor Village Green
Maine		Brunswick		150-200	Brunswick Gazebo on the Mall
Maine		Gouldsboro		25	Gouldsboro Women's March 2.0 was held at Gouldsboro Town Office and organized by Acadia Action.
Maine	Jan. 21	Portland		200	Women's March One Year Anniversary: Reconnect, Refresh, Resist; SPACE Gallery (capacity of 250)
Maryland		Annapolis		hundreds	Lawyers Mall - Susan Campbell Park. Newly elected Annapolis Mayor Gavin Buckley kicked off the rally
Maryland		Baltimore		7,000 - 10,000+	Baltimore Women's March: March Forward held on January 20, from 11 to 2 p.m. beginning at War Memorial Plaza; bigger turnout than the 5,000 from 2017. Baltimore Mayor Catherine Pugh & city councilwoman Shannon Sneed spoke.
Maryland	Jan. 21	Frederick		hundreds	corner of North Market & Patrick Streets; walk along Carroll Creek toward the amphitheater
Maryland	Jan. 21	Ocean City		hundreds	Boardwalk next to the Hugh T. Cropper Inlet parking lot. Cambridge, MD Mayor Victoria Jackson-Stanley spoke to the crowd before the march began.
Maryland		Takoma Park		12	event planned at Piney Branch Elementary, with Mayor Kate Stewart scheduled to speak.
Maryland	Jan. 21	Westminster		300+	People of all ages gathered on Sunday in front of Jeanniebird Baking Co., and marched up and down Main St.
Massachusetts	Jan. 21	Andover		200	Shawsheen Square
Massachusetts		Ayer		500+	Ayer Town Hall
Massachusetts		Cambridge		10,000	Cambridge/Boston Women's March 2018: The People Persist, organized by Massachusetts Peace Action and March Forward Massachusetts. Up to 10,000 met at the Cambridge Common, a much smaller area than the Boston Common where 150,000+ gathered in 2017. U.S. Senators Ed Markey and Elizabeth Warren had planned to speak, but were in Washington and unable to attend the event. State Attorney General Maura Healey, however, was available to speak at the rally, as were state Rep. Marjorie Decker and Cambridge Mayor Marc McGovern. Also present were a group of Trump-supporting counter-protesters, who were separated from the event by police and Veterans for Peace.
Massachusetts	Jan. 21	Charlton			event planned at Charlton Arts & Activities Center
Massachusetts		Greenfield		500	Greenfield Town Common & Square; 2nd annual Franklin County Women's Rally
Massachusetts		Hyannis		hundreds	Cape & Islands Women's March, Hyannis Village Green. Emceed by State Rep Sarah Peake (D-Provincetown)
Massachusetts	Jan. 21	Ipswich		dozen	Ipswich Center Green
Massachusetts	Jan. 21	Lowell		120	Lowell Solidarity March and DDD (Demonstrate, Drink, and Discuss); UMass Lowell Inn & Conference Center 2-6 pm. Former Newton Mayor & 2018 candidate for governor Setti Warren spoke at the event.
Massachusetts		Martha's Vineyard		50+	Five Corners, Vineyard Haven
Massachusetts		Nantucket		100+	Nantucket United Methodist Church
Massachusetts		New Bedford		hundreds	Custom House Square - New Bedford Public Library. New Bedford Mayor Jon Mitchell and his wife Ann Partridge addressed the rally from the library steps
Massachusetts		Northampton		2,000	2nd annual Pioneer Valley Women's March - protesters marched from Sheldon Field to Northampton City Hall
Massachusetts		Pittsfield		200	hosted by The Berkshire Theatre Group on South St
Massachusetts		Shrewsbury		dozen	event planned at Shrewsbury Town Common
Massachusetts		Topsfield		138	Tri-Town Women's March, Topsfield Commons. State Rep. Brad Hill (R) spoke at the event.
Michigan		Adrian		250	Lenawee County Courthouse Former Adrian Mayor Jim Berryman attended.
Michigan		Ann Arbor		3,000 - 4,000	#WeToo: Celebrating a New Way; outside the Federal Building / University of Michigan Diag
Michigan		Bay City		100	Bay City Hall
Michigan	Jan. 21	Douglas / Saugatuck		1,000+	Over a thousand people (according to The Commercial Record) gathered at Beery Park and marched over the bridge to downtown Saugatuck. Some Trump supporters were present.
Michigan	Jan. 21	Farmington Hills		177	event planned at Farmington Hills Manor Banquet & Restaurant
Michigan	Jan. 21	Grand Rapids		hundreds	Rosa Parks Circle
Michigan		Holland		350	Centennial Park
Michigan	Jan. 21	Houghton		500	Portage Lake Lift Bridge
Michigan	Jan. 21	Kalamazoo		3,000	Western Michigan University, march to Bronson Park. The crowd was triple the size of the 2017 turnout.
Michigan	Jan. 21	Lansing		5,000	Michigan's largest Women's March rally in 2018 took place at the State Capitol in Lansing. Cindy Garcia, the wife of Jorge Garcia, 39, of Lincoln Park, who was deported to Mexico Monday as part of a Trump administration crackdown on undocumented immigrants, drew cheers as she spoke about her family's situation.
Michigan	Jan. 21	Marquette		thousands	march from Main St to Front St, then down Washington St, ending with a rally in front of the post office
Michigan	Jan. 21	Midland		425	Corner of Eastlawn and Saginaw
Michigan	Jan. 21	Saint Joseph		43	Lake Bluff Park
Michigan		Traverse City		3,000 - 4,500	Traverse City Chamber of Commerce - Cass St, Front St, Park St & Union St; police estimated the crowd was "comparable to last year's overwhelming 3,000."
Michigan		Ypsilanti		100+	Ypsi March for Love, Resilience and Action 2018; Ypsilanti District Library - Riverside Art Center
Minnesota		Bemidji		500	The Sanford Center - BSU's Beaux Arts Ballroom. Bemidji Mayor Rita Albrecht spoke at the event.
Minnesota	Jan. 21	Caledonia			event planned at The Wired Rooster Coffee Shop
Minnesota		Duluth		hundreds	Twin Ports Women's March 2018 gathered at the Building for Women, then marched along First Street to Duluth City Hall. Mayor Emily Larson was one of the speakers.
Minnesota		Fergus Falls			event planned at The Spot Panini and Wine
Minnesota		Grand Marais		185	Harbor Park; event hosted by Arrowhead Indivisible
Minnesota		Mankato		~50	Jackson Park
Minnesota	Jan. 21	Morris		170	event planned at Morris Senior Center
Minnesota		Rochester		180	Winter Is Coming - Women's March; Peace Plaza, 2pm Indivisible Rochester
Minnesota	Jan. 21	St. Paul		2,500	Union Depot. State Rep Ilhan Omar, DFL-Minneapolis, spoke the crowd
Minnesota	Jan. 21	Thief River Falls			event planned at City Hall
Mississippi		Jackson		500	Mississippi State Capitol; hosted by Indivisible Jackson
Missouri		Columbia		1,650 - 2,000	Boone County Courthouse Square
Missouri		Kansas City		500	three-mile walk from Brookside to Swope Park, ending with a rally at Unity Southeast Church
Missouri		St. Louis		8,000	march from Union Station to Old Courthouse. More than 40 speakers addressed the crowd at Luther Ely Smith Plaza and City Hall
Missouri	Jan. 19	Springfield			Planned event (Jan 19–20) - Springfield Women's March Anniversary Action / #PowerToThePolls voter registration tour, a 24-hour event, started Friday evening at Sisters in Thyme Bistro & Bakery and wrapped up on Saturday evening at Queen City Wine Dive.
Missouri		West Plains			Postcards to Voters event planned at The Yellow House
Montana		Billings		hundreds	The Women's March in Billings drew a large crowd that marched to North Park Community Center. Native American marchers raised concerns about missing and murdered indigenous women.
Montana		Bozeman		1,300	People gathered at Montana State University and marched to the Strang Union building. Bozeman Mayor Cyndy Andrus was present. Native American marchers raised concerns about missing and murdered indigenous women.
Montana		Browning			Browning Community March planned: Blackfeet Community College parking lot - Museum of the Plains Indians
Montana		Butte		39	Nasty Women Chili Feed, Carpenters Union Hall
Montana		Great Falls		300	Nearly 300 people attended the Rise Together for Democracy observance that started in Gibson Park and ended at the YWCA, although Gerry Jennings of Great Falls Rising, which cosponsored the event along with the YWCA, said she heard crowd estimates as high as 1,000
Montana		Helena		2,000	In Helena, a Women's March was followed by a Rise Together for Democracy Rally in the Rotunda of the Montana State Capitol. State Sen. Christine Kaufmann spoke to the crowd. Whereas in 2017 Helena served as the one Montana location for a crowd of 10,000 (the largest public demonstration in state history), this year there were nine rallies across the state, putting the crowd total at 8,500.
Montana		Kalispell		600-700	Women's March Flathead took place at Depot Park.
Montana		Miles City		50	Riverside Park
Montana		Missoula		3,000	Gathering at Wilma Theatre; march on Higgins Avenue to Caras Park. After the previous year's marches had been criticized for excluding people of color and other marginalized communities, this year's march promoted an intersectional feminist movement by highlighting the voices of Native women, black women, transgender women, immigrant women, women with disabilities, and more.
Nebraska		Lincoln		1,000+	March began at 3pm at University of Nebraska Student Union, proceeding down Centennial Mall to the steps of the Capitol Building. Jessica McClure, a candidate for the House of Representatives, said the 2017 march motivated her campaign. U.S. Senate candidate Jane Raybould also spoke.
Nebraska		Loup City		100+	Loup City Community Center - Sherman County Historical Society - Highway 58
Nebraska		Omaha		8,000+	rally at Gene Leahy Mall, outside W. Dale Clark Library, followed by a march through downtown Omaha.
Nebraska		Wayne		50+	The first Women's March in Wayne, NE started at Neihardt's roundabout and ended at Victor Park.
Nevada	Jan. 21	Las Vegas		8,000	The "Power to the Polls" campaign to register a million new voters was launched in Las Vegas with a massive turnout at Sam Boyd Stadium (capacity of 40,000). NPR's Leila Fadel on PBS explained that the goal was to flip swing states like Nevada, which is also considered to be a battleground state. Las Vegas was also chosen in the aftermath of the country's deadliest gun massacre on Oct 2, 2017. Among featured speakers were: Alicia Garza, one of the founders of Black Lives Matter; Cecile Richards, current president of Planned Parenthood; singer & actress Cher, actress Marisa Tomei; US Rep John Lewis (D-GA) and US Senator Catherine Cortez Masto who, in 2016, became the first woman to represent Nevada and the first Latina to serve in the Senate. Also present was US Rep Paulette Jordan (D-ID), who had just spoken at a Saturday rally in Sandpoint, Idaho.
Nevada		Reno		10,000 - 12,000	Bruce R Thompson Federal Building; the crowd stretched from Liberty Street to California Avenue.
Nevada		Stateline		400	The 2nd Women's March to South Lake Tahoe (CA) began at Hard Rock Hotel & Casino.
New Hampshire		Concord		1,000+	New Hampshire State House. Sen. Maggie Hassan and Rep. Annie Kuster were both expected to speak at the Saturday rally, but organizers say they were unable to leave D.C.
New Hampshire		Francestown		134	
New Hampshire	Jan. 21	Jackson		500	Jackson Covered Bridge - Grammar School
New Hampshire		Lancaster		44	event planned at Great North Woods parking lot
New Hampshire	Jan. 21	Peterborough		hundreds	Peterborough Town Hall
New Hampshire		Portsmouth		1,000+	Market Square
New Hampshire		Wilton		5	Public Library front lawn - Wilton Main Street Park and Riseup Center, Brick Mill Complex
New Jersey	Jan. 21	Asbury Park		124	The one-year anniversary of the 2017 Women's March Asbury Park was commemorated at the Asbury Hotel with a gallery show of posters collected from the march, titled "Still We Rise."
New Jersey		Glen Rock		80	Glen Rock-Main Line Train Station (group trip to NYC)
New Jersey		Leonia		300+	Leonia Middle School - Broad Ave
New Jersey		Monroe		18+	event held in Monroe, with State Senator Linda Greenstein and Mayor Jerry Tamburro.
New Jersey		Morristown (was Trenton)		15,000 - 20,000	Shortly after the 2017 Women's March on New Jersey in Trenton, a group known as NJ 11th for Change started showing up every Friday at the headquarters of US Rep Rodney Frelinghuysen (R) in Morristown, demanding a town-hall meeting to answer concerns about the fate of the Affordable Care Act. In December 2017, organizers of the Trenton march moved the upcoming 2018 event to Morristown, known for its historical significance (Gen. George Washington's army spent two winters during the Revolutionary War), but also by which time Frelinghuysen had numerous mid-term challengers from both parties for his seat in Congress (he would later drop out of the race on January 29). The march in Morristown started at Town Hall on South Street, and ended at the Town Green. Attendance in Morristown ranged between 15,000 (according to police) and 20,000 (according to Mayor Timothy Dougherty), which far surpassed the original expectations of 4,000 people, and more than doubled the 2017 estimate of 7,500 at Trenton. Newly sworn in Democratic Governor Phil Murphy (succeeding Chris Christie) addressed the rally; his wife, First Lady Tammy Murphy, said she was a victim of sexual violence while a student at the University of Virginia.
New Jersey		Ocean City		600	Hundreds of people met at 9th Street Park, and marched up & down Asbury Ave. Congressional candidate Tanzie Youngblood spoke to the rally.
New Jersey		Westfield		1,500 - 2,000	rally at the train station, march thru downtown to Mindowaskin Park
New Mexico	Jan. 21	Alamogordo		100+	The First Annual Alamogordo Women's March; Otero County Courthouse - Pavilion at Alameda Park
New Mexico	Jan. 21	Albuquerque		thousands	Civic Plaza. Elizabeth Kistin Keller, the First Lady of Albuquerque, spoke to the crowd
New Mexico	Jan. 21	Fort Sumner			event planned in Dallas Park
New Mexico	Jan. 21	Las Cruces		800	Plaza de Las Cruces, Downtown Mall
New Mexico		Portales		40	outside the Roosevelt County Courthouse
New Mexico	Jan. 21	Santa Fe		4,000 - 5,000	West DeVargas St. - Santa Fe Plaza
New Mexico		Socorro		~140	March from Tech's Gate to the Plaza
New Mexico		Taos		200	Taos Plaza - Kit Carson Park
New Mexico		Truth or Consequences		12	event planned at Healing Waters Plaza
New York		Albany		5,000 - 6,000	Rally held at West Capitol Park. Albany Mayor Kathy Sheehan was present, but US Rep Paul Tonko, who wanted to be present, was stuck in Washington, DC.
New York		Binghamton		1,000+	Martin Luther King Jr. Promenade - United Presbyterian Church of Binghamton
New York	Jan. 21	Buffalo		4,500	Niagara Square outside City Hall - march down Delaware Ave toward downtown Buffalo, through Lafayette Square, and back. Mayor Byron W. Brown spoke at the march
New York		Canton		150	Unitarian Universalist Church
New York		Cobleskill		450	Centre Park
New York		Glens Falls		hundreds	Old Planned Parenthood at Warren & Oak - gazebo in City Park. Among the crowd were at least six NY-21 Democratic congressional candidates hoping to unseat Republican incumbent Rep. Elise Stefanik; Tedra Cobb sent a group representing her to the Glens Falls march while she marched in the town of Plattsburgh.
New York		Hudson		2,000 - 2,500	This was larger than the crowd of 1,200 in 2017, according to police (the total population in Hudson is only 6,700). The march began at 7th Street Park, and Indivisible CD 19 NY lead the event. Ten people spoke and then activists marched from Warren to Basilica Hudson on the waterfront. Voter registration was available at Basilica Hudson.
New York		Lewis		200	Adirondack Women's March - 200 participants went up to the Lewis Cemetery, atop what was once known as Suffrage Hill, and laid flowers on the grave of famed suffragette Inez Milholland. Afterwards, the march headed to Lewis Veterans' Park and Lewis Town Hall, before returning to the Lewis Congregational Church.
New York		New York City		200,000+	There were more than 200,000 protesters at the 2nd women's march in New York, stretching 30 city blocks along Central Park West, from the Museum of Natural History at 86th St to Columbus Circle in front of the Trump International Hotel at 59th St. New York Governor Andrew Cuomo spoke to the crowd. Meanwhile, at Union Square, about 200 women and men gathered at a Feminism & Faith in Unity rally.
New York		North Creek		75	Adirondack March for Democracy; Tannery Pond Community Center - Riverside Park
New York		Plattsburgh			
New York		Pleasantville		250	Memorial Plaza Gazebo; hosted by Indivisible Pleasantville
New York		Port Jefferson		several hundred	Resistance Corner, 5141 Nesconset Hwy (corner Rte 347 & Rte 112)
New York		Port Jervis		300	St. Peter's Lutheran Church
New York		Rochester		several hundred	Held at Washington Square Park. Indivisible Rochester and Gender Equity Movement of SUNY Brockport organized the rally. A letter from Rochester Mayor Lovely Warren, who at the time was in Seneca Falls, was read to the crowd.
New York		Sag Harbor		hundreds	windmill on Long Wharf / Flying Point Surf Boutique - American Hotel, Main St
New York		Seneca Falls		12,000 - 15,000	Thousands gathered (some dressed as suffragettes) at the Women's Rights National Historical Park, site of the country's first women's rights convention in 1848 (and also thus affected by a current government shutdown); police said more people attended this year than last. Rochester's first female Mayor, Lovely Warren, pleaded for women to get involved in government at all levels, saying they are woefully underrepresented. New York Lt. Gov. Kathy Hochul also spoke to the crowd.
New York		Staten Island		250	The Staten Island Women Who March, Move Forward Staten Island, Wagner College students and many other Staten Islanders met at 9 a.m. at the Staten Island Ferry Terminal.
New York		Syracuse		200+	CNY Women Rising 2018 - march from Laci's Tapas Bar to ArtRage Gallery
New York		Utica		200+	March from YWCA to City Hall
New York		Watertown		several hundred	All Souls Unitarian Universalist Church
New York		Woodstock		5,000	Andy Lee Baseball Field - Bradley Meadow via Mill Hill Road
North Carolina		Asheville		3,000	Memorial Stadium, Asheville Mayor Esther Manheimer spoke
North Carolina		Black Mountain		500+	Town Square
North Carolina		Burnsville			event planned at Burnsville Town Center
North Carolina		Charlotte		5,000+	"Remarchable Women" First Ward Park - Romare Bearden Park. Charlotte's first female African-American mayor, Vi Lyles, addressed the crowd
North Carolina		Hillsborough		500+	Old Orange County Courthouse
North Carolina		New Bern		36	"We the People NB" rally was held at Broad Street Christian Church.
North Carolina		Raleigh		5,000 - 10,000	Halifax Mall; more of a rally than a march
North Carolina		Wilmington		2,000+	Thalian Hall downtown. Organized in part by Women Organizing for Wilmington [WOW], currently at 1900 members (tripling since 2017)
North Carolina		Winston-Salem		thousands	Corpening Plaza. Mayor Allen Joines addressed the crowd
North Dakota	Jan. 19	Bismarck		67	Friday rally planned at the United Tribes Technical College Gym; hosted by the North Dakota Women's Network
North Dakota		Fargo		1,000	Fargo Civic Center Centennial Hall. The rally took place in the lower level, where space limited the audience to about 600 or 700. However, hundreds more waited outside the Civic to join in the march that followed the rally. Participants kept the tone of the event upbeat, even when a Fargo resident known for his pro-white rhetoric made an appearance.
North Dakota		Grand Forks		200+	Empire Arts Center
North Dakota		Minot		10	Federal Building - Scandinavian Heritage Center
Ohio		Athens		500 - 600	First United Methodist Church - Athens County Courthouse
Ohio		Cincinnati		10,000 - 12,000	The Second Cincinnati Women's March, organized by United We Stand, met at the National Underground Railroad Freedom Center. The route stretched for 1.5 miles along Race Street and back. Meanwhile, a pro-life march took place near Fountain Square.
Ohio		Cleveland		7,000 - 10,000	Organized by the Women's March Northeast Ohio chapter; voter registration at Cleveland Public Square; march to Cleveland City Hall at Willard Park and back.
Ohio		Columbus		3,000	Greater Columbus Convention Center - Ohio Statehouse. Columbus City Councilwoman Elizabeth Brown, daughter of US Sen. Sherrod Brown, spoke to a cheering crowd inside the Convention Center.
Ohio		Dayton		few thousand	An event was held at Courthouse Square
Ohio		Lakewood		90	NE Ohio Power to the Polls Forum; Lakewood UCC
Ohio		Lima		17	Lima's Town Square
Ohio		Mount Vernon			"Signs on the Square" event planned at Public Square
Ohio		Newark		200+	Licking County Courthouse Square
Ohio	Jan. 21	Toledo		600	YWCA of Northwest Ohio Rise Unity March; Toledo Loves Love Wall (mural) - Trinity Episcopal Church at Summit St. Participants included State Rep Teresa Fedor.
Ohio		Wooster		200	Wooster Public Square Historic District - Wooster City Hall
Oklahoma		Oklahoma City		thousands	Oklahoma State Capitol. Protesters chanted, "We need a leader, not a creepy tweeter!"
Oklahoma		Tulsa		3,000 - 3,500	Guthrie Green - Living Arts of Tulsa Building
Oregon		Albany		200	Power of Hope Women's Rally; Linn County Courthouse
Oregon		Astoria			event planned at Lovell Showroom - Turn the Tide 2018 Regional Summit, hosted by Indivisible North Coast Oregon (INCO)
Oregon		Bend		~3,000	Drake Park - downtown streets
Oregon		Brookings		200+	Brookings-Harbor Women's March was held outside Democratic Headquarters on Chetco Ave; event organized by Indivisible 97415
Oregon		Coos Bay		300	Coos Bay Boardwalk
Oregon		Corvallis		3,000+	Central Park - Northwest Jackson Avenue
Oregon		Eugene		3,000 - 7,000	Indivisible Eugene's Women's March for Action began at Wayne Lyman Morse Federal Courthouse and headed north toward Mill Street. Signs included "In our America women are in charge of their own bodies." Event organizers estimated 5,000-7,000 people attended the march; Eugene Police estimated 3,000-4,000. US Rep Peter DeFazio, who was stuck in Washington due to the government shutdown, addressed the crowd over the phone.
Oregon		Grants Pass		900	March from Riverside Park to Josephine County Courthouse. The next day, 350 people showed up in the rain for the annual March for Life in Grants Pass and took the same path in reverse.
Oregon		Joseph		150	people marched along Main St.
Oregon		Klamath Falls		200+	Klamath County Government Center - South Sixth Street bridge; Klamath Falls Mayor Carol Westfall was both a speaker and marcher.
Oregon		La Grande		300	March planned at Union County Offices
Oregon		Medford (was Ashland)		several thousand	Women's March Southern Oregon (Jackson County), which in 2017 took place in Ashland, relocated to the greater city of Medford in 2018 for its second event. At least several thousand came to Hawthorne Park and marched half a mile through downtown to Pear Blossom Park. Though the end point could accommodate as many as 10,000 people, it was unclear whether this march matched Ashland's turnout of 8,000, but the level of commitment and determination was no less diminished. Speakers included State Rep. Pam Marsh (D-Ashland) & Democratic congressional candidate Jamie McLeod-Skinner.
Oregon		Newport		1,000	Resist & Persist: Women's March of Lincoln County; Newport City Hall - Newport High School
Oregon		Pendleton		350-400	Pendleton City Hall
Oregon		Port Orford		70+	Battle Rock Wayside Park - Highway 101 - public library; event hosted by Indivisible North Curry County
Oregon	Jan. 20 & 21	Portland		~ 1,000 (total)	Dozens of police in riot gear were present in Portland as four protests and rallies took place over the weekend, with hundreds of demonstrators (and some counter-protesters) in attendance, though not nearly as many as 100,000 back in 2017. (Jan. 20) The Trump Impeachment March met at Terry Schrunk Plaza (2,000 were expected to attend; at least 300 showed up) and marched through downtown Portland to the Battleship Oregon Memorial. Along the way, the marchers passed by Pioneer Courthouse Square, site of the #MeToo March and SpeakOUT rally (400 people). Later in the evening, a Freedom March (< 100 people) led by right-wing group Patriot Prayer began at Salmon Street Springs. (Jan. 21) The Indigenous Womxn's March took place at Terry Schrunk Plaza, where once again people came by the hundreds.
Oregon		Roseburg		200	NW Garden Valley Blvd
Oregon		Salem		1,000	Braving both the rain and a guy waving a Nazi flag, hundreds of people gathered at the state capitol and marched through Salem
Oregon		Sandy			2nd Annual Women's March on Sandy planned near Centennial Plaza
Oregon		The Dalles		400	Gorge Womxn's March 2018; began and ended at City Park on Union Street; the previous year's march had 150 people.
Oregon		Tillamook		100+	We're Still Here! Women's March Tillamook; Pedestrian Plaza
Pennsylvania		Bethlehem		500	Payrow Plaza - an anticipated crowd of 200 more than doubled by noon
Pennsylvania		Bloomsburg		150	rally held near town fountain at Main & Market Streets
Pennsylvania		Carlisle		dozen	A small crowd gathered at The Old Courthouse on the Square
Pennsylvania	Jan. 21	Doylestown		1,000	Bucks County Old Courthouse on East Court Street - Main & Court Streets
Pennsylvania	Jan. 21	Erie		hundreds	Perry Square
Pennsylvania		Gettysburg		400	Lincoln Square - Unity Park
Pennsylvania		Hollidaysburg		200+	Blair County Courthouse - Allegheny St; a growth in attendance from 35 people in 2017.
Pennsylvania	Jan. 21	Indiana		150+	IRMC Park
Pennsylvania	Jan. 21	Millheim			event planned at Millheim Post Office
Pennsylvania		Philadelphia		40,000 - 55,000	Event hosted by Philly Women Rally, Inc. Protesters marched on Benjamin Franklin Parkway, from Logan Circle to Eakins Oval at the Philadelphia Museum of Art, from whence lead organizer Emily Cooper delivered a speech to the rally. While the 2017 event drew more than 50,000, organizers believe that year's powerful #MeToo and "Time's Up" movements over sexual harassment helped boost attendance for 2018. Organizers also concentrated on "diversity and inclusion" in response to criticisms about the 2017 March; specific themes included racial justice. Members of the Black Lives Matter movement, Camp Sojourner and Girls Incorporated programs were among the marchers. Local politicians, such as Jannie Blackwell, Cherelle Parker, Maria Quiñones-Sánchez, and Rebecca Rhynhart participated. Gov. Tom Wolf's deputy chief of staff Nedia Ralston spoke on behalf of the governor.
Pennsylvania	Jan. 21	Pittsburgh		30,000	Market District Giant Eagle - Let's Get Organized the Day Before the March to the Polls; event began at City County Building on Grant Street. Thousands of people, including Mayor Bill Peduto, marched to Market Square; organizers estimated 30,000 people, a bigger turnout than in 2017 (25,000). Voting was a constant theme; a number of those in attendance carried signs or wore buttons supporting particular political candidates, such as Democrat Conor Lamb for the 18th Congressional District in a March 13 special election.
Pennsylvania	Jan. 21	Pottsville		40	Union Station
Pennsylvania		Sharon		500	Columbia Theatre Park, Downtown Sharon. Hosted by Indivisible Mercer
Pennsylvania		State College		300-500	Allen Street Gates - State College Municipal Building
Rhode Island		Providence		1,000+	Rhode Island State House South Lawn. Rhode Island Gov. Gina Raimondo and Providence Mayor Jorge Elorza attended and mingled, but no politicians or political candidates were invited to speak, as the organizers wanted the crowd to hear new voices rather than stump speeches.
South Carolina		Charleston		3,500	Rally for Electoral Justice, Brittlebank Park. Charleston Mayor John Tecklenburg spoke to the crowd.
South Carolina		Greenville		1,000+	Falls Park on the Reedy River
South Carolina	Jan. 21	Marion			march planned from East Godbold St to the Town Square across from the courthouse
South Carolina		Myrtle Beach		300+	Anderson Park; attendees marched on a sidewalk on Ocean Blvd to Plyler Park
South Dakota		Custer		25+	event planned at Way Park, by the CC Courthouse
South Dakota		Pierre		130	rally held in the State Capital
South Dakota		Rapid City		hundreds	Central High School - Memorial Park - band shell
South Dakota		Sioux Falls		2,500+	Carnegie Town Hall - Minnehaha County Courthouse. Sioux Falls Mayor Mike Huether presented marchers with a key to the city for their marching efforts.
Tennessee		Bristol		75-100	Bristol Virginessee Women's March; in proximity to Bristol, Virginia
Tennessee		Chattanooga		3,000+	Coolidge Park. Chattanooga Mayor Andy Berke was present
Tennessee		Johnson City		1,000+	Women's March 2.0 Tri-Cities TN Rally; East Tennessee State University parking lot - Founders Park
Tennessee	Jan. 21	Knoxville		14,000	The Knoxville Women's March 2.0 was sponsored by Women's March - Knoxville, to "show their support for women's rights and the electoral victories women have won." But organizers were forced to change their rally/march starting point from Market Square to Krutch Park, with heavy police presence, when the Traditionalist Worker's Party (TWP), a neo-Nazi group, planned a counter-demonstration. On Sunday, about 20 white nationalists faced off against a crowd of thousands before leaving the area about an hour later, according to the Knoxville News-Sentinel. Meanwhile, 700 people gathered at a competing [counter]protest, March for Life, a few blocks away at Knoxville Convention Center.
Tennessee		Memphis		1,000+	First Congregational Church
Tennessee		Nashville		15,000+	Tennessee Women's March 2.0, Public Square Park - Bicentennial Mall. Clarksville Indivisible was one of many groups heading to the march. Nashville Mayor Megan Barry spoke to the crowd at the park.
Texas	Jan. 21	Alpine		200	Alpine Civic Center - Brewster County courthouse. Marfa Mayor Ann Marie Nafziger spoke
Texas		Amarillo		100 - 250	Sponsored by Indivisible Amarillo, the second annual Women's March stretched from Ellwood Park to the Potter County Courthouse.
Texas		Austin		10,000	Hosted by Texas Reproductive Rights Rally (TRRR). As many as 10,000 people gathered for a rally at Austin City Hall and marched to the Texas State Capitol. While lacking in numbers compared with 40,000-50,000 from 2017, this one made up for in energy, enthusiasm and the occasional touch of dramatic choreography - a group of women dressed in "Handmaid's Tale" costume led the march, protesting against female oppression. Among the speakers at the capitol was former Texas state Sen. Wendy Davis, who in 2013 garnered national attention for her nearly 13-hour filibuster over new Texas abortion restrictions. Also present were two Democratic candidates for Governor of Texas, Lupe Valdez and Andrew White.
Texas		Beaumont		100+	Betty Smith Creative Arts Studio - Calder Avenue; hosted by Golden Triangle Indivisible
Texas		Brownsville		200	Washington Park; "Still We Rise" rally
Texas	Jan. 20 & 21	Dallas		7,000	(Jan 20) The Dallas Women's March 2018 began at St Paul United Methodist Church, and proceeded through Uptown to a rally in Pike Park. The Dallas Morning News noted that Saturday's police estimate of 7,000 actually seemed larger than the 2017 turnout. State Reps. Helen Giddings and Victoria Neave, and County Commissioner Elba Garcia took part in the event. Around the same time, an Impeach Trump rally took place at City Hall. A few miles away at the Guadalupe Cathedral, the March for Life, marking the 45th anniversary of Roe vs. Wade, also attracted thousands of people (though not quite as many as the Women's March). (Jan 21) For good measure, a First Anniversary Women's March Rally was scheduled to take place on Sunday at Dallas City Hall Plaza.
Texas		Denton		800	Denton Courthouse Square
Texas	Jan. 21	El Paso		500	Centennial Plaza at University of Texas at El Paso - San Jacinto Plaza
Texas		Fort Worth		5,000	Tarrant County Courthouse
Texas		Houston		20,000+	Thousands once again participated in the half-mile walk from Buffalo Bayou Water Works Building to Houston City Hall. The turnout was almost as high as 2017's inaugural crowd of 22,000. Houston Mayor Sylvester Turner was joined by his predecessor Annise Parker and police chief Art Acevedo. US Reps Al Green and Sheila Jackson Lee called in via speakerphone from Washington, DC, where most of Congress was struggling to deal with the government shutdown.
Texas		Huntsville		65	town square
Texas		Lubbock		350	Tim Cole Memorial Park / intersection of 19th Street and University Avenue
Texas		Midland		25-50	Dozens gatehred in front of Claydesta Plaza, at the corner of Wadley Ave and Big Spring St.
Texas		Nacogdoches		100+	County Courthouse
Texas		Palestine			event planned: Farmer's Market - Anderson County Courthouse
Texas		San Antonio		500	Hosted by at least eight different organizations, including Texas 23rd District Indivisibles. Protesters gathered in front of San Fernando Cathedral, and marched past the Paul Elizondo Tower and City Hall before returning to Main Plaza.
Texas		Waco		350	Event held at Heritage Square
Texas	Jan. 20 & 21	Weatherford			(Jan 20) Parker County Democratic Headquarters served as a meeting point for carpooling to the Fort Worth march. (Jan 21) A town hall meeting was scheduled for US Representative and Senate candidate Beto O'Rourke (TX-16), but he was stuck in Washington, DC along with many other members of Congress during the government shutdown.
Texas		Wichita Falls		dozens	Wichita Falls Women's March 2018; Sikes Lake - Parker Square Shopping Center
Utah		Logan		hundreds	Historic Cache County Courthouse Democratic Senate candidate Jenny Wilson was present.
Utah		Ogden		200+	Ogden Municipal Gardens
Utah		Park City		1,000	There were hundreds of women at the Respect Rally in Park City, in conjunction with the Sundance Film Festival. Rapper Common wowed the crowd by performing "The Day the Women Took Over." Featured speakers were Jane Fonda, Gloria Allred, Kathryn Hahn, Nick Offerman, Maria Bello, Phoebe Waller-Bridge, Tessa Thompson, Chloë Grace Moretz, Elle Fanning and Lena Waithe. Salt Lake City Mayor Jackie Biskupski also spoke to the crowd, as did Democratic Senate candidate Jenny Wilson.
Vermont		Brattleboro		~100	Gathering in Solidarity; Pliny Park - Main and High Streets
Vermont	Jan. 21	Manchester		dozens	The Large Roundabout
Vermont		Montpelier		3,000	March For Our Future, Montpelier City Hall - Statehouse lawn
Virginia		Bristol		75-100	Bristol Virginessee Women's March, Bristol Sign; in proximity to Bristol, Tennessee
Virginia		Independence / Galax / Hillsville			One march in Virginia went eastward through three cities, over a distance of 27 miles: The first leg started at 10 am at the Historic 1908 Courthouse in Independence, hosted by the Grayson County Sewing & Resistance Society; around 12:30 pm, the second leg, hosted by Huddle Up Twin County, continued through the Diversity Center in Galax; the final leg, also hosted by Huddle Up Twin County, stretched into Hillsville and arrived at Carter Pines Community Park Labyrinth, around 4 pm.
Virginia	Jan. 21	Norfolk		800+	(Jan 21) - The Hampton Roads Women's March Forward and "Girls Take Granby" kick-off rally started at noon in front of the Decker Half Moon Cruise Terminal in Town Point Park, and marched down Granby St to the Federal Courthouse and back. Two counter-protesters, one of whom was from Charlottesville, held up homemade signs in support of Donald Trump.
Virginia		Richmond		1,000 - 3,000	Women's March RVA, at Martin's in Carytown. Recently elected Governor Ralph Northam joined event organizers in leading the march.
Virginia		Roanoke		thousands	Thousands of demonstrators marched in the afternoon from Elmwood Park amphitheater (capacity of over 4,000) through downtown Roanoke.
Virginia		Williamsburg		2,000	Colonial Williamsburg Courthouse, Duke of Gloucester St. The number of people present was almost three times that of 2017 (700 people).
Washington	Jan. 19	Anacortes		1,500	Depot Arts & Community Center - Commercial Avenue to Third Street & back
Washington		Bellingham		2,000 - 2,500	At Bellingham City Hall, about 2,000 to 2,500 people marched with many carrying signs referencing "immigration, sexual assault/harassment, President Donald Trump and the White House, women's rights, LGBTQ and minority rights, healthcare, environmental issues." It was sponsored by Women Marching for Unity, Equity, Justice, and Humanity to commemorate the anniversary of the 2017 historic march which drew 10,000 citizens into the streets.
Washington		Eastsound		100	Orcas Island; Waterfront Park - Village Green
Washington		Ellensburg		200-300	Kittitas County Courthouse
Washington		Friday Harbor		1,000	Island Women's March; San Juan County Courthouse
Washington		Kenmore			march planned at Kenmore City Hall
Washington		Longview		200-250	Longview Civic Circle - R.A. Long Park
Washington		Moses Lake		100	Moses Lake Surf n Slide Water Park
Washington		Mount Vernon		450	Pine Square
Washington		Ocean Shores		150-200	Ocean Shores Convention Center
Washington		Olympia		8,000	Thousands turned out for a rally at the Capitol in Olympia (8,000, according to Washington State Patrol spokesman Kyle Moore), followed by a march around Capitol Lake. State Rep. Laurie Jinkins (D-Tacoma) spoke to the crowd.
Washington		Omak		400	Omak Civic League Park
Washington		Port Townsend		4,000	A colorful and boisterous crowd gathered peacefully at Quimper Mercantile on Water Street and walked five blocks to Pope Marine Park
Washington	Jan. 21	Richland		1,000	John Dam Plaza. About 1,000 marchers braved chilly, damp weather.
Washington	Jan. 20 & 21	Seattle		25,000 - 90,000	(Jan 20) Tens of thousands marched in the Womxn's March 2.0 on Seattle from Cal Anderson Park to Seattle Center. Members of the group Missing and Murdered Indigenous Women (MMIW) helped lead the march and spoke about the violence faced by Native American women in particular. Seattle's first female mayor in nearly a century, Jenny Durkan (D), issued a call to combat racism & sexism at all levels, including the White House; State Rep Kristine Reeves (D-Federal Way) also spoke. US Rep Pramila Jayapal was unable to speak as planned due to the ongoing budget battle in Washington, D.C. (Jan 21) The Womxn Act on Seattle consisted of training, workshops and lectures offered by about 90 organizations around the city.
Washington		Shoreline		150+	grassy area near Walgreens, east side of Aurora Ave & 175th St
Washington	Jan. 21	Spokane		6,000 - 6,500	Spokane Convention Center. In its second year, the Spokane Women's March – now called the Spokane Women's Persistence March - had about 2,000 fewer participants than in 2017 but showed no less spunk. Gathered at the Red Wagon in Riverfront Park, marchers assembled by the hundreds until the sea of people – mostly women – got so large it spilled out onto Spokane Falls Boulevard.
Washington	Jan. 21	Vancouver			event planned at Water Resources Education Center—Bruce E Hagensen Community Room, and hosted by SW Washington Coalition Action Network
Washington		Walla Walla		~ 2,500	First Congregational Church - Alder Street
Washington		Yakima		800+	Millennium Plaza
West Virginia		Beckley		~75	Shoemaker Square. State Sen. Richard Ojeda spoke to the almost all female crowd
West Virginia		Charleston		100	The Voter's March and March for Impeachment was held at the West Virginia Capitol. Later in the afternoon, marchers came together for a Women's March anniversary part at Sam's Uptown Café
West Virginia	Jan. 21	Morgantown		hundreds	The first Morgantown Women's March was held at WVU Mountainlair Student Union rally, titled "Handmaid's Protest - Women's March Still Strong One Year Later"; Mountaineers for Progress
Wisconsin		Eau Claire		300-400	rally at Phoenix Park, march to Unitarian Universalist Congregation
Wisconsin		Green Bay		nearly 400	YWCA Greater Green Bay (Cowles Auditorium)
Wisconsin		Janesville		89	Janesville, WI Post Office
Wisconsin		Milwaukee		1,500 - 3,000	Women, men and children gathered on the Milwaukee County Courthouse square for the second annual Women's March "to protest the policies of President Donald Trump and urge voters to take control of Congress from Republicans in 2018." March organizer Sarah Pearson & state Sen. Lena Taylor (D-Milwaukee) addressed the crowd.
Wisconsin		Minocqua		200	St. Matthias' Episcopal Church
Wisconsin		Sauk City		100	Highway 12 bridge
Wisconsin		Walworth		100+	Heyer Park / Walworth Square
Wisconsin		Wausau		300	Event held at 400 Block
Wyoming		Casper		350	Beech St. Plaza (at Second & Beech) - The Lyric
Wyoming		Cheyenne		750 - 1,000	In spite of a potentially threatening Facebook post comment about the Cheyenne march (referring to explosives), between 750 and 1,000 people gathered at the Cheyenne Depot Plaza and marched down Capitol Avenue to the Wyoming Supreme Court. Voting and electing more women into office was emphasized by numerous speakers, including: Democratic gubernatorial candidate Mary Throne; state Rep Cathy Connolly (D-Laramie); state Rep James W. Byrd (D-Cheyenne); and march organizer Sara Burlingame, who announced her plans to run for Byrd's seat in the 44th House district (Byrd would later announce his candidacy for Wyoming Secretary of State).
Wyoming	Jan. 21	Cody		300+	Marches gathered in Cody's City Park to promote gender equality. Mayor Matt Hall spoke to the crowd; musician Garret Randolph played folk songs.
Wyoming		Jackson Hole		300+	Over 300 people met at Home Ranch Visitor Center and marched in downtown Jackson.
Wyoming		Laramie		93	Wyoming Art Party gathered at The Laramie Plains Civic Center for a caravan to the 2018 Wyoming march in Cheyenne.
Wyoming		Pinedale		60	Rocky Mountain Bank parking lot, 145 E. Pine St

== Worldwide ==
Listed below are marches outside the United States in support of the 2018 Women's March.

- Argentina
- Australia
- Austria
- Belgium
- Brazil
- Canada
- Chile
- China
- Colombia
- Costa Rica
- Croatia
- Czech Republic
- Denmark
- Ecuador
- Fiji
- Finland
- France
- Georgia
- Germany
- Ghana
- Greece
- Hong Kong
- Hungary
- Iceland
- India
- Indonesia
- Iraq
- Ireland
- Israel
- Italy
- Japan
- Jordan
- Kenya
- Kosovo
- Kyrgyzstan
- Latvia
- Lebanon
- Lithuania
- Macau
- Malawi
- Mexico
- Myanmar
- Netherlands
- New Zealand
- Nigeria
- Norway
- Peru
- Philippines
- Poland
- Portugal
- Serbia
- South Africa
- South Korea
- Spain
- Sweden
- Switzerland
- Taiwan
- Tanzania
- Thailand
- Togo
- Uganda
- United Kingdom
- Zambia

=== North America ===
In Canada there were at least 38 rallies held on January 20.

Country	Prov.	Locations	Photo	Approximate attendance	Notes
Canada	AB	Calgary		3,500	Thousands of inter-generational marchers walked from Bankers Hall to Calgary City Hall carrying hand-made signs with slogans such as "Time's Up", calling for "equality, community and hope." Organizers of the 2018 March, Ashley Bristowe and Adora Nwofor, said it was "not only about politics or social justice...[but] about being connected to your community."
Canada	AB	Edmonton		1,000	Hundreds of people packed the grounds of the Alberta Legislature; March On Edmonton Collective
Canada	BC	Chilliwack		150	Women's March Fraser Valley Event; Ann Davis HQ - Chilliwack City Hall
Canada	BC	Courtenay		hundreds	
Canada	BC	Grand Forks		100	Gyro Park - Resource Centre
Canada	BC	Kamloops		150+	Sandman Centre
Canada	BC	Kelowna		20	Kelowna City Hall
Canada	BC	Nanaimo		1,000+	Maffeo Sutton Park
Canada	BC	Roberts Creek		150-200	protest held outside the Gumboot Cafe
Canada	BC	Salmon Arm		80	Salmon Arm City Hall - Highway 1 - Ross Street Plaza
Canada	BC	Salt Spring Island		300	Salt Spring Island - streets of Ganges
Canada	BC	Vancouver		2,000 - 5,000	march at Jack Poole Plaza, 10am-1pm; a downpour did not deter the crowd
Canada	BC	Victoria		1,300+	Centennial Square - Government Street - legislature
Canada	MB	Winnipeg		hundreds	City Hall
Canada	NB	Fredericton		130	rally held at Fredericton City Hall (397 Queen St)
Canada	NB	Saint John		159	event planned at Queen Square, South End
Canada	NL	North West River		11	event planned at North West River Beach
Canada	NL	St. John's		67	event planned at St. John's City Hall
Canada	NS	Halifax		400	Halifax's Grand Parade. The women's march in Halifax was roiled by divisions, as members of an offshoot event showed up to call for the recognition of marginalized groups after some people said they felt unsafe at the 2017 gathering.
Canada	NS	Sandy Cove		31	half the town's population marched
Canada	ON	Hamilton		270	Women's March Forward Summit was held at Hamilton City Hall, followed by an outdoor rally
Canada	ON	Huntsville		125+	Women's March Muskoka; Huntsville Place Mall - River Mill Park
Canada	ON	Kitchener		hundreds	Kitchener City Hall - Kitchener Market
Canada	ON	London		hundreds	Victoria Park (NW corner), 580 Clarence St
Canada	ON	Ottawa		6,000 - 8,000	march from Parliament Hill to Bronson Centre
Canada	ON	Stratford		51	Stratford City Hall
Canada	ON	St. Catharines		59	Niagara Women March On; Mahtay Café & Lounge
Canada	ON	Sudbury		200	Bell Park, York Street parking, corner of Paris St & York St
Canada	ON	Thunder Bay		100+	Ka-Na-Chi-Hih Centre, 1700 Dease Street - McIntyre River Bridge
Canada	ON	Toronto		thousands	"Defining Our Future" Nathan Phillips Square, 12pm. The march started at Queen's Park and ended at Toronto City Hall
Canada	ON	Wiarton		26	315 George St, South Bruce Peninsula
Canada	ON	Windsor		500+	The crowd gathered at City Hall Square about 11 a.m. for speeches before marching along University Avenue and Ouellette Avenue to the giant Canadian flag at the riverfront.
Canada	ON	Woodstock		34	Woodstock Museum National Historic Site
Canada	PE	Charlottetown			PEI March for Equality; Grafton Street side of the Coles Building
Canada	QC	Montreal		500	Hundreds gathered outside Place des Arts Saturday
Canada	SK	Regina		hundreds	(first ever) Regina Women's March, organized by the local YWCA
Canada	SK	Saskatoon		400	Hundreds of Saskatoon residents made their way down to River Landing Saturday to voice support for women's rights
Canada	YT	Whitehorse		~100	Main Administration Building
Costa Rica	Mar. 8	San José		hundreds	Costa Rica's Women's March 2018 was held on International Women's Day; hundreds marched by the Parque Central. One person of concern to many protesters was Fabricio Alvarado Muñoz, an evangelical preacher and presidential candidate of the National Restoration Party, a right-wing Christian party.
Mexico		Mexico City			

=== South America ===
Country	Date	Locations	Photo	Approximate attendance	Notes
Argentina		Buenos Aires		100	100 people gathered outside the US Embassy in Argentina for the one year anniversary of the International Women's March
Brazil		Brasília			
Chile		Santiago			
Colombia		Bogotá			
Colombia	Jan. 20	Medellín			Medellin Museum of Modern Art (MAMM)
Ecuador		Quito			
Peru		Lima			

=== Europe ===
Country	Date	Locations	Photo	Approximate attendance	Notes
Austria		Vienna			
Belgium		Brussels		2,000	
Croatia		Zagreb			
Czech Republic		Prague			
Denmark		Copenhagen			
Finland		Helsinki			
France	Jan. 21	Auvillar			
France		Bordeaux			
France	Jan. 21	Grenoble			gathering of Americans planned near the Musée de Grenoble
France	Jan. 21	Lyon			rally planned at Place des Terreaux
France		Marseille			
France		Montpellier			
France		Nice			
France	Jan. 21	Paris		hundreds	(Jan 21) A 2:30 pm event was scheduled at the Trocadéro. Hundreds gathered under the Eiffel Tower in the rain, chanting, "This is what democracy looks like." They carried umbrellas as well as posters to protest "sexual misconduct and discrimination against women."
France		Strasbourg			
France	Jan. 21	Toulouse			A #MeToo gathering invited women and men to La Maison d'à Côté, a tea salon, organized by Democrats Abroad France.
Germany		Berlin		500	About 500 people - including Americans, Germans, Palestinians, Israelis and Finnish citizens - turned up at a rally near the iconic Brandenburg Gate, waving banners against xenophobia and misogyny
Germany		Bonn			
Germany		Düsseldorf			
Germany		Frankfurt			
Germany		Hamburg			
Germany		Heidelberg		c. 500	About 500 people marched from Friedrich-Ebert-Platz and proceeding along the Hauptstrasse to Rathausplatz/Marktplatz in the center of the city's Old Town. Marchers walked for justice, security and freedom of expression and against populism and xenophobia. #metoo marked this year's demonstration.
Germany		Munich		300+	"Women's March to the Polls" was held on Saturday; started at Siegestor and ended at Marienplatz. Vote from Abroad would also be registering Americans for absentee ballots
Greece	Jan. 21	Athens			Syntagma Square - US Embassy.
Hungary		Budapest			
Iceland		Reykjavík			
Ireland		Galway			
Ireland		Dublin			
Italy		Florence			
Italy		Rome		hundreds	dozens of activists gathered in Rome, at Piazza Santissimi Apostoli, to denounce violence against women and express support for the #MeToo movement. They were joined by Italian actress and director Asia Argento, who made headlines in 2017 after alleging she had been sexually assaulted by Hollywood producer Harvey Weinstein in the 1990s. Rosabell Laurenti Sellers was also scheduled to come.
Kosovo		Pristina			
Latvia		Riga			
Lithuania		Vilnius			
Netherlands		Amsterdam			
Netherlands		The Hague			
Norway		Bergen			
Norway	Jan. 21	Oslo		1,000	Youngstorget - parliament building
Norway		Stavanger			
Poland		Gdańsk			
Poland		Kraków			
Poland		Warsaw			
Portugal		Lisbon			
Portugal		Porto			
Serbia		Belgrade			
Spain	Jan. 21	Barcelona			Event planned in Plaça de la Virreina from 4pm to 8pm.
Spain		Granada			
Spain		Madrid		hundreds	Madrid Resistance organized its rally on Sunday afternoon, drawing hundreds of women in Madrid to the Plaza de Isabel II to protest the Trump presidency, domestic and sexual violence, and the wage gap; "Grab 'em by the patriarchy"
Spain		Seville			
Sweden	Jan. 21	Stockholm		1,000	Norrmalmstorg - Humlegården
Switzerland		Zürich			
United Kingdom		Bristol		few dozen	Castle Park - Broadnead and the Centre - College Green
United Kingdom		Edinburgh			
United Kingdom		Lancaster			
United Kingdom		Leeds			
United Kingdom		Liverpool			
United Kingdom	Jan. 21	London		thousands	In heavy sleet and rain, thousands of people (mostly women) marched from Downing Street (outside Prime Minister Theresa May's office) past the Monument to the Women of World War II carrying slogans and chanting "Time's up" and "We want justice not revenge." Women's rights activist Helen Pankhurst (great-granddaughter of British suffragette Emmeline Pankhurst) spoke to the rally.
United Kingdom		Manchester			
United Kingdom		Southampton			
United Kingdom		York			

=== Africa ===
Country	Date	Locations	Photo	Approximate attendance	Notes
Ghana		Accra		17	
Kenya		Nairobi			US Embassy
Malawi		Lilongwe			
Nigeria		Jos			
South Africa		Cape Town			
South Africa		Durban			
Tanzania		Dar es Salaam			
Togo		Lomé		thousands	Women dressed in black marched through Lomé calling for an end to the dictatorship of Faure Gnassingbé whose presidency was passed on from father to son.
Uganda		Kampala			
Zambia		Lusaka			Marchers sought to raise awareness about gender-based violence, including harassment.

=== Asia ===
Country	Date	Locations	Photo	Approximate attendance	Notes
China		Beijing			
Georgia		Tbilisi			
Hong Kong		Hong Kong			
India	Jan. 21	Bangalore			Central Library, Cubbon Park
India	Jan. 21	Hyderabad			Public Gardens, Nampally
India	Jan. 21	Jammu			
India	Jan. 21	Kolkata			
India	Jan. 21	Mumbai			Shivaji Park / outside Love and Latte, Lokhandwala back road
India	Jan. 21	Nagpur			
India		New Delhi			
India	Jan. 21	Pune			MG Road
Indonesia		Yogyakarta			
Indonesia		Jakarta			
Iraq		Erbil			
Israel		Tel Aviv			
Japan		Osaka			
Japan	Jan. 19	Tokyo			Akasaka Kumin Center
Jordan		Amman			
Kyrgyzstan		Bishkek			
Lebanon		Beirut			
Macau		Macau			
Myanmar (Burma)		Yangon (Rangoon)			
Philippines		Manila			
South Korea		Seoul			
Taiwan	Mar. 8	Taipei		200-300	In Taipei city, a march took place on March 8, International Women's Day, starting at Liberty Square and finishing at the Red Room International Village, with participation including Taiwanese legislator, Yu Mei-Nu and Taipei Women's Rescue Foundation. Hundreds carried slogans in heavy rain for more than 4 km to "Fight Invisible Discrimination and March for Equality." A Celebrating Women event, including art exhibition, speeches, and workshops took place after the march.
Thailand		Bangkok			

=== Oceania ===
State	Date	Cities	Photo	Approximate attendance	Notes
Australia	Jan. 21	Brisbane		hundreds	Hundreds took part in Brisbane's central business district (CBD) carrying signs and chanting
Australia		Canberra			
Australia	Jan. 21	Melbourne		500	Alexandra Gardens - banks of the Yarra
Australia	Jan. 21	Sydney		1,500+	In lieu of a march, more than 1,500 people linked arms in a chain and chanted, "We are unbroken" in Sydney's Hyde Park.
Fiji		Suva		40	Fiji Women's Crisis Centre
New Zealand		Auckland			
New Zealand		Dunedin			
New Zealand		Wellington		350	Te Puna Mātauranga o Aotearoa (National Library of New Zealand)

== Locations ==
The 2018 Women's Marches took place in many cities, towns and villages around the world since January 20, 2018.

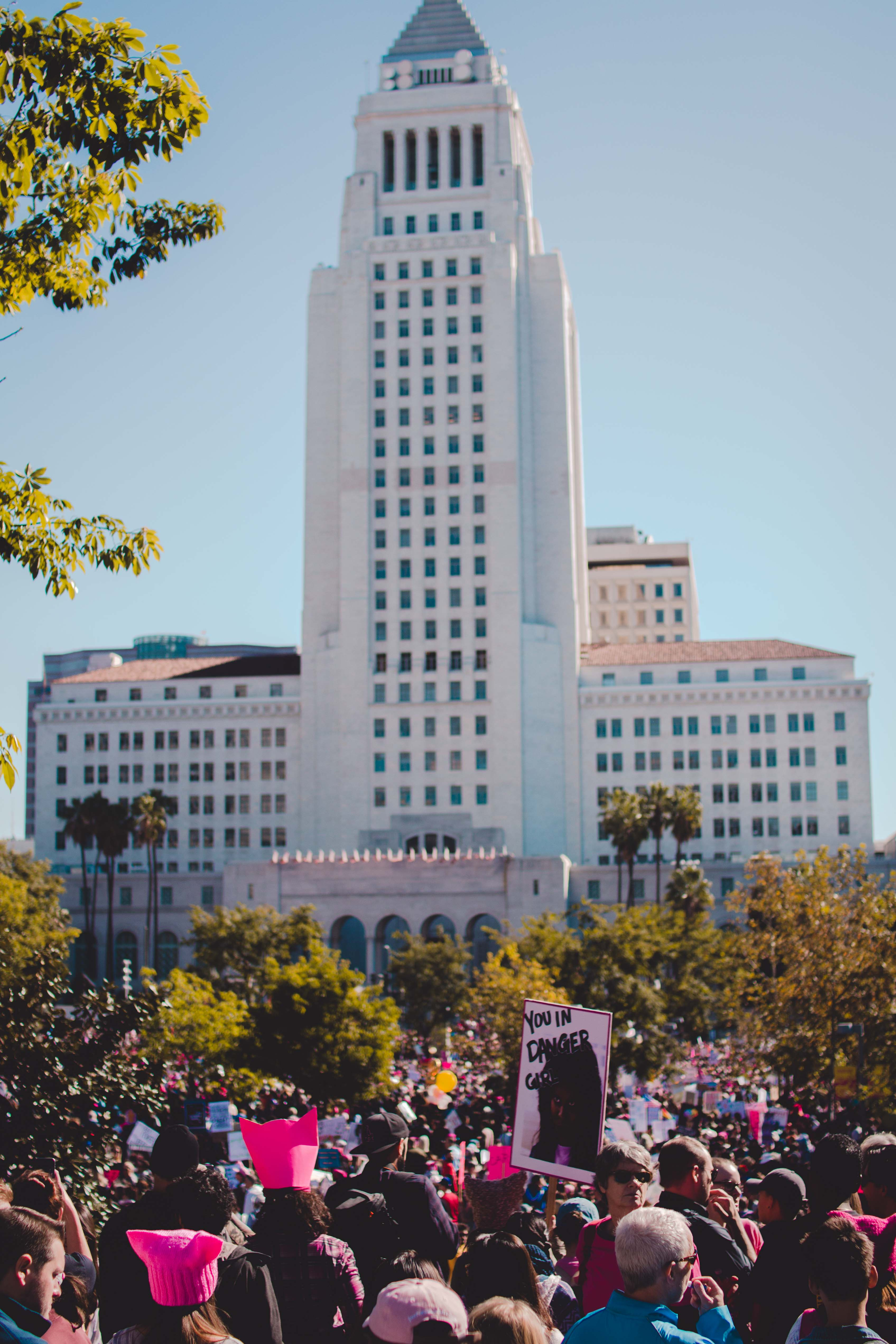
Los Angeles by nguyengurl

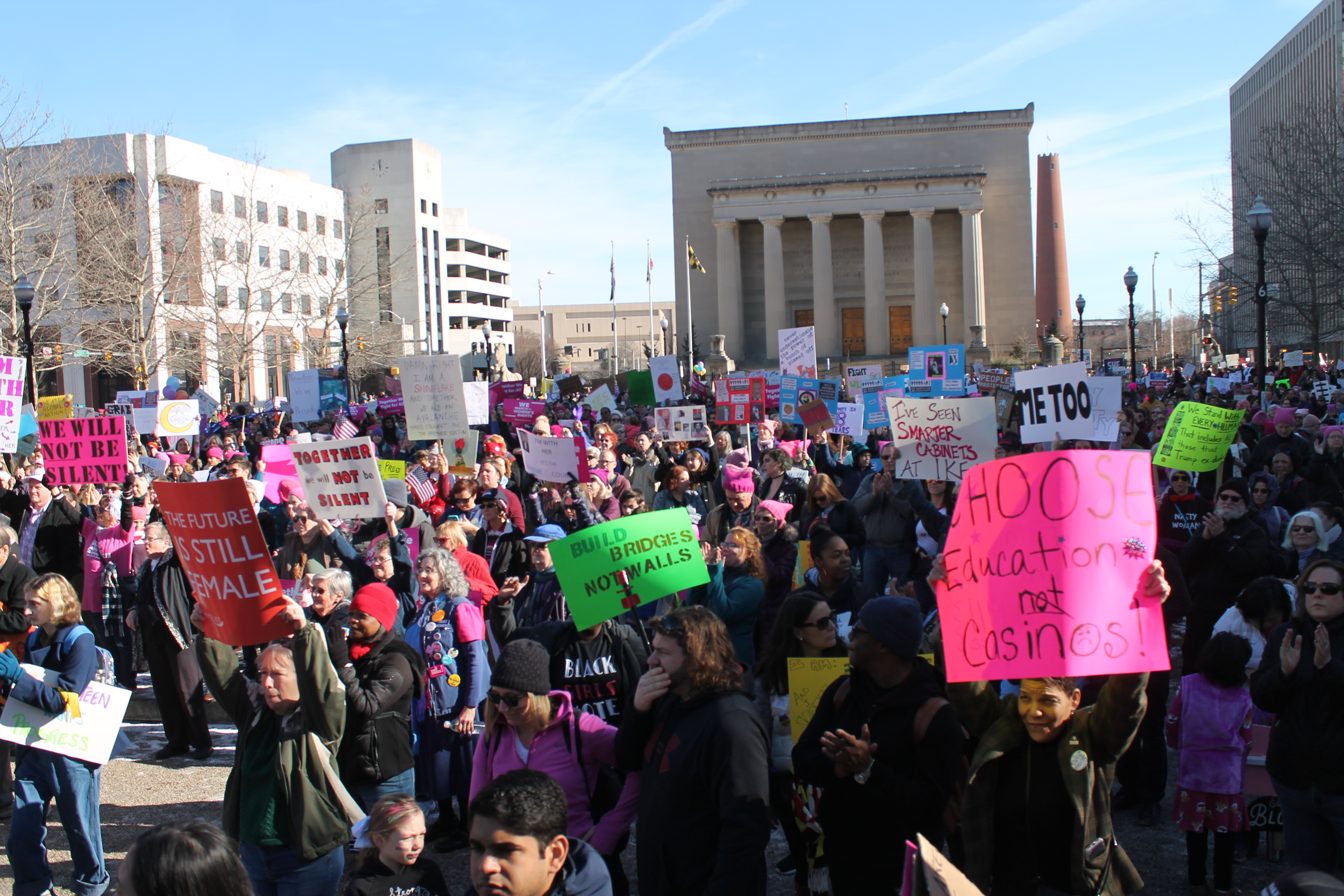
Baltimore, Maryland by Elvert Barnes

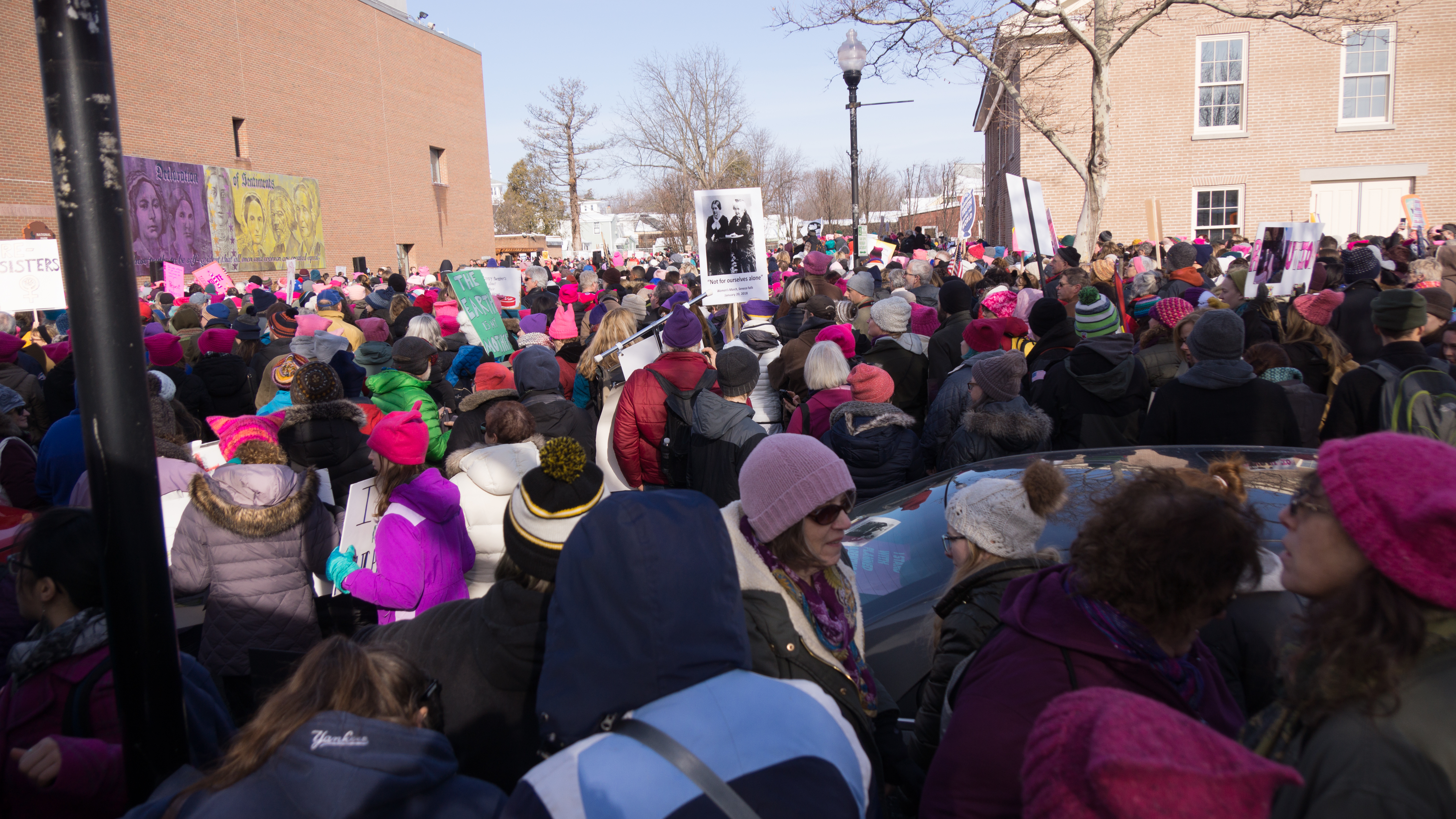
Seneca Falls

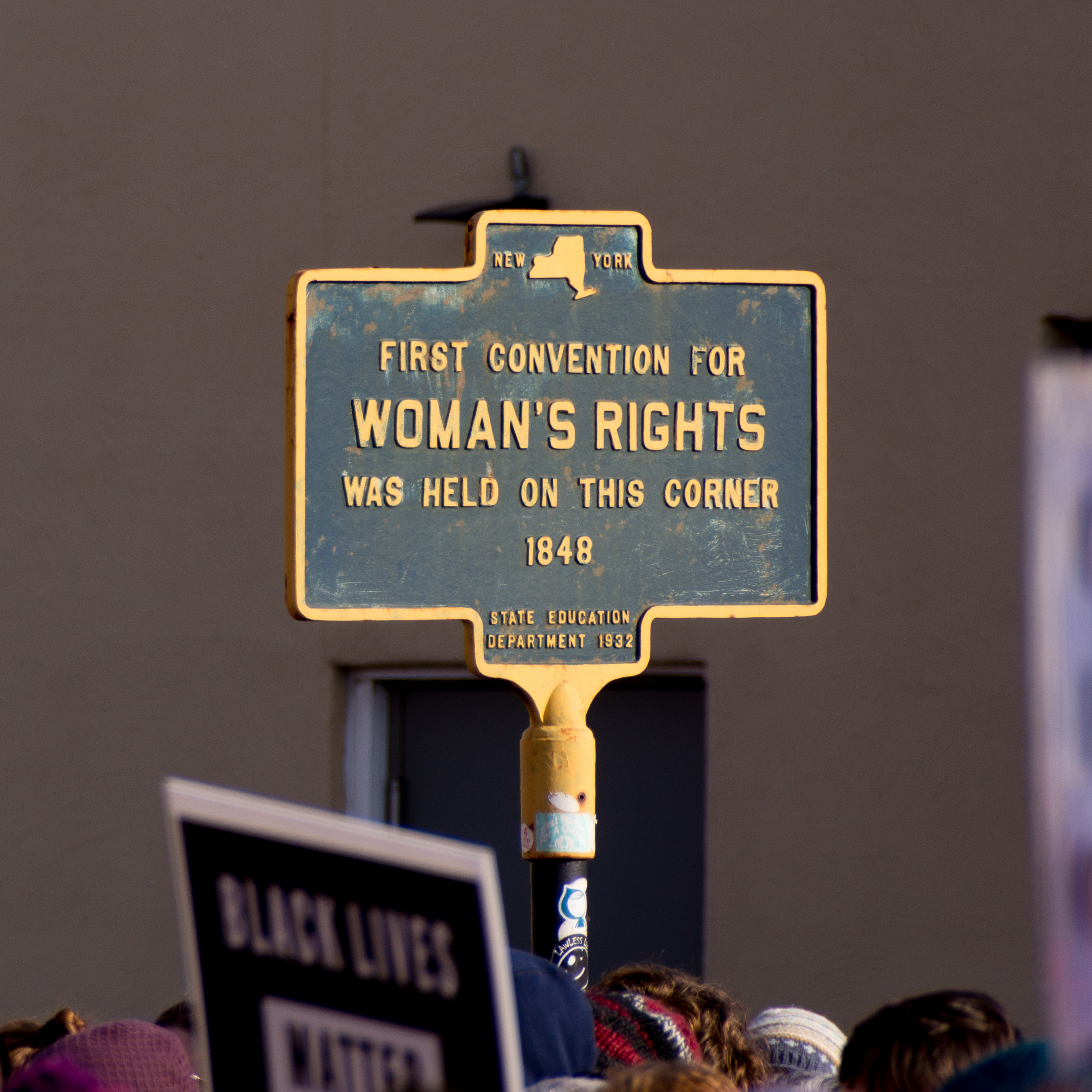
Seneca Falls by Marc Nozell

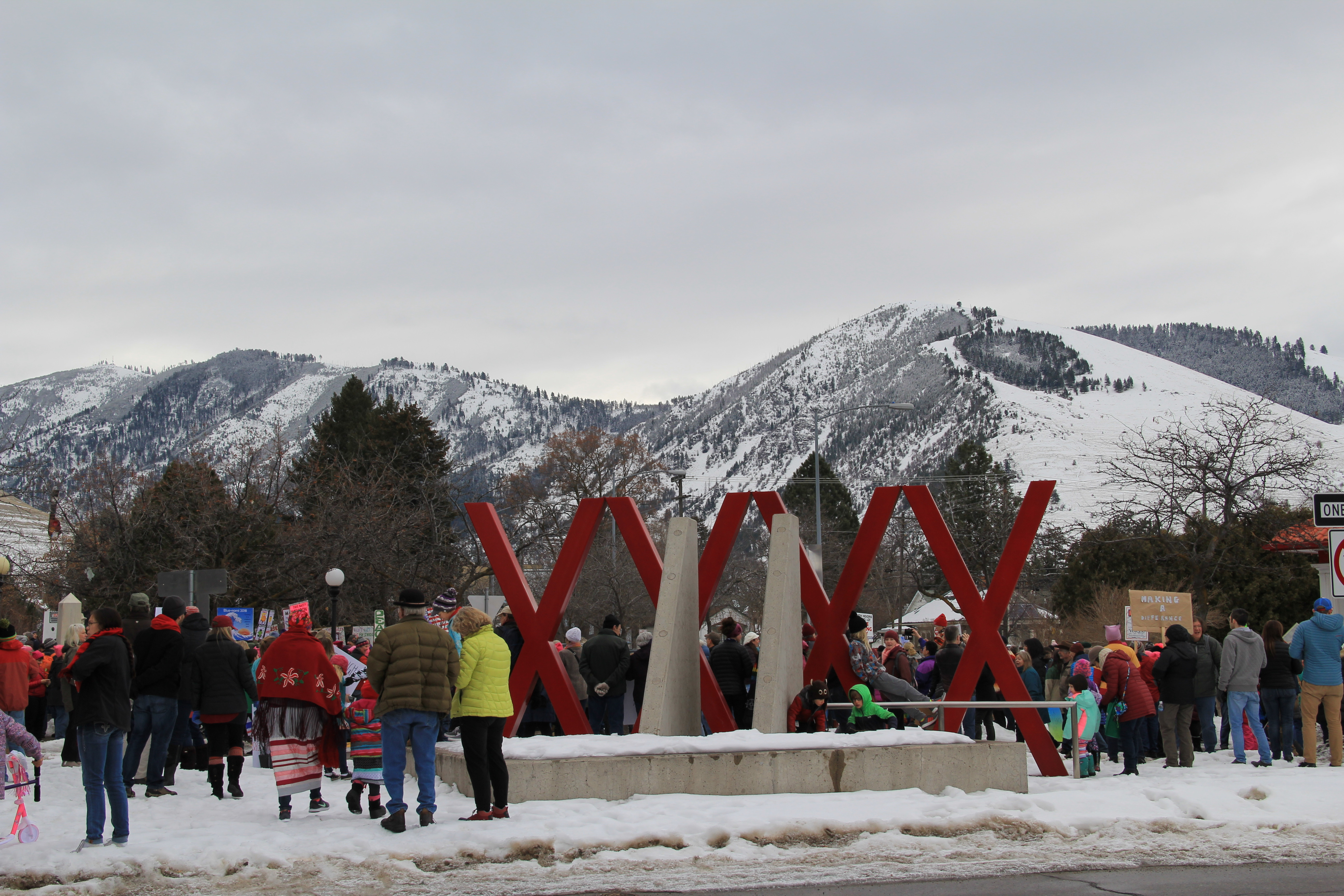
Missoula, MT
