= National Speleological Society =

Organization for exploration, conservation, and study of caves in the United States

- Abbreviation: NSS
- Formation: January 1, 1941; 85 years ago
- Founder: Bill Stephenson
- Type: Nonprofit
- Purpose: Dedicated to the scientific study of caves and karst; protecting caves and their natural contents through conservation, ownership, stewardship, and public education; and promoting responsible cave exploration and fellowship among those interested in caves.
- Location: Huntsville, Alabama, US
- Region served: 210 Grottos; 12 Geographical Regions; 15 Specialty Sections; 11 Cave Surveys
- Members: 8,700
- Executive Director: Annette Engel
- Main organ: Board of Governors
- Affiliations: American Association for the Advancement of Science, International Union of Speleology
- Budget: $1.5 million
- Website: caves.org

The National Speleological Society (NSS) is an organization formed in 1941 to advance the exploration, conservation, study, and understanding of caves in the United States. Originally headquartered in Washington D.C., its current offices are in Huntsville, Alabama. The organization engages in the research and scientific study, restoration, exploration, and protection of caves. It has more than 10,000 members in more than 250 grottos.

Since 1974 there has been a cave diving section of the society.

== History ==
The Speleological Society of the District of Columbia (SSDC) was formed on May 6, 1939 by Bill Stephenson. In the fall of 1940, the officers of the SSDC drafted a proposed constitution that would transform the SSDC into the National Speleological Society. On January 24, 1941, Stephenson sent a letter to all members of the SSDC announcing that "on January 1 the Society was reorganized as a national organization." The New England Grotto was the first NSS Grotto. It was chartered in 1941 with Clay Perry as president and Ned Anderson as vice president.

On February 6, 1974, pioneering cave diver Sheck Exley became the first chairman of the Cave Diving Section of the National Speleological Society. The new section began with 21 members in 10 different states.

== Publications ==
The NSS produces a number of publications, including:

- NSS News (monthly)
- American Caving Accidents (annually)
- Journal of Cave and Karst Studies (quarterly), formerly The NSS Bulletin (from 1940 to 1995).
- Convention Guidebooks
- Journal of Spelean History ISSN 0022-4693
- Nylon Highway

No longer produced:

- Speleo Digest (from 1956 to 2003)
- Membership Manual

The NSS's list of long and deep caves was kept until 2022 by surveyor and cartographer Robert Gulden.

== Organization ==
The organization is currently divided into 12 regions:

- Arizona Regional Association (ARA)
- Mid-Appalachian Region (MAR)
- Mississippi Valley-Ozark Region (MVOR)
- Northeastern Regional Organization (NRO)
- Northwest Caving Association (NCA)
- Ohio Valley Region (OVR)
- Rocky Mountain Region
- Southeastern Regional Association (SERA)
- Southwestern Region (SWR)
- Texas Speleological Association (TSA)
- Virginia Region (VAR)
- Western Region

Within these regions are local chapters known as grottos. The grottos carry out the local-level recreational and conservation-related business of the NSS. They generally function as the local NSS chapter/club. Many Grottos however operate in areas outside of their local area, with many operating in several states. Most Grottos also participate in Regions that are loose associations of Grottos. Regions are also an internal organization of the National Speleological Society.

Grottos are required to meet certain organizational requirements as outlined by the National Speleological Society. These include:

- A constitution and bylaws that are submitted to, and approved by, the NSS.
- A minimum of at least five members of the Society.
- It is NSS policy that full membership in a Grotto requires NSS membership. However, in practice, this is often not the case.

== Convention ==
The NSS hosts a yearly convention, which is generally held in June. Grottos take turns hosting the convention.

Convention Year	Location
1967	Black Hills, SD
1968	Springfield, MO
1969	Lovell, WY
1970	State College, PA
1971	Blacksburg, VA
1972	White Salmon, WA
1973	Bloomington, IN
1974	Decorah, IA
1975	Angels Camp, CA
1976	Morgantown, WV
1977	Alpena, MI
1978	New Braunfels, TX
1979	Pittsfield, MA
1980	White Bear Lake, MN
1981	Bowling Green, KY
1982	Bend, OR
1983	Elkins, WV
1984	Sheridan, WY
1985	Frankfort, KY
1986	Tularosa, NM
1987	Sault Ste. Marie, MI
1988	Hot Springs, SD
1989	Sewanee, TN
1990	Yreka, CA
1991	Cobleskill, NY
1992	Salem, IN
1993	Pendleton, OR
1994	Brackettville, TX
1995	Blacksburg, VA
1996	Salida, CO
1997	Sullivan, MO
1998	Sewanee, TN
1999	Twin Falls, ID
2000	Dailey, WV
2001	Rock Castle County, KY
2002	Camden, ME
2003	Porterville, CA
2004	Marquette, MI
2005	Huntsville, AL
2006	Bellingham, WA
2007	Marengo, IN
2008	Lake City, FL
2009	Kerrville, TX
2010	Essex Junction, VT
2011	Glenwood Springs, CO
2012	Lewisburg, WV
2013	Shippensburg, PA
2014	Huntsville, AL
2015	Waynesville, MO
2016	Ely, NV
2017	Rio Rancho, NM
2018	Helena, MT
2019	Cookeville, TN
2020	Virtual
2021	Virtual
2022	Rapid City, SD
2023	Elkins, WV
2024	Sewanee, TN
2025	Cobbleskill, New York
2026	Corydon, Indiana

== Awards ==
The Society makes a series of awards, presented during its annual convention:

- William J. Stephenson Award for Outstanding Service
- Honorary Member Award
- Lew Bicking Award
- Science Award
- Victor A. Schmidt Conservation Award
- Spelean Arts and Letters Award
- Certificate of Merit
- Fellow of the Society
- James G. Mitchell Award
- Outstanding Landowner-Caver Relations Award
- Peter M. Hauer Spelean History Award
- Steve Hudson Award for Cave Rescue
- Group Conservation Award
- Alvin McDonald Award

=== Photos ===
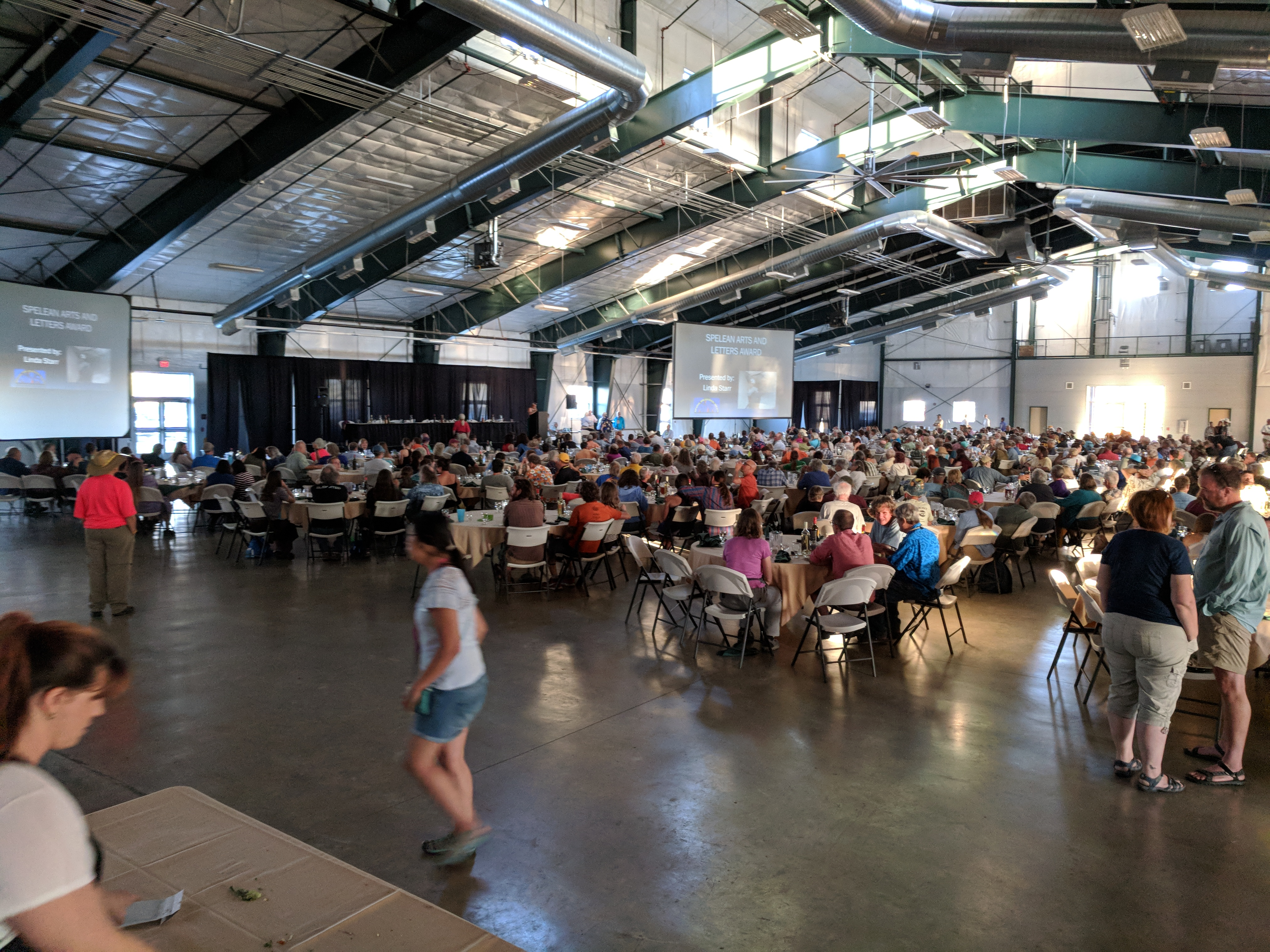
2018 banquet

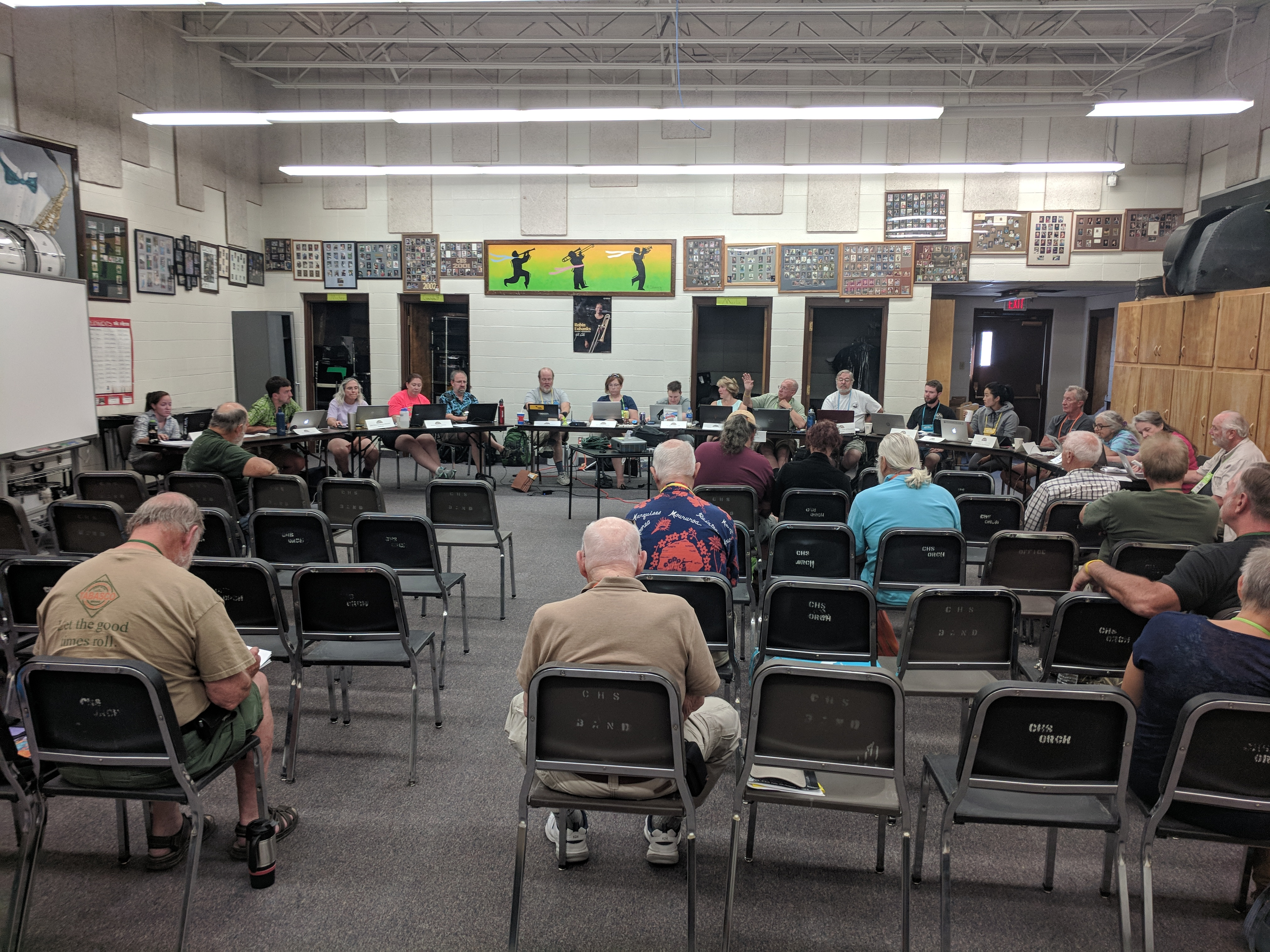
2018 open board meeting

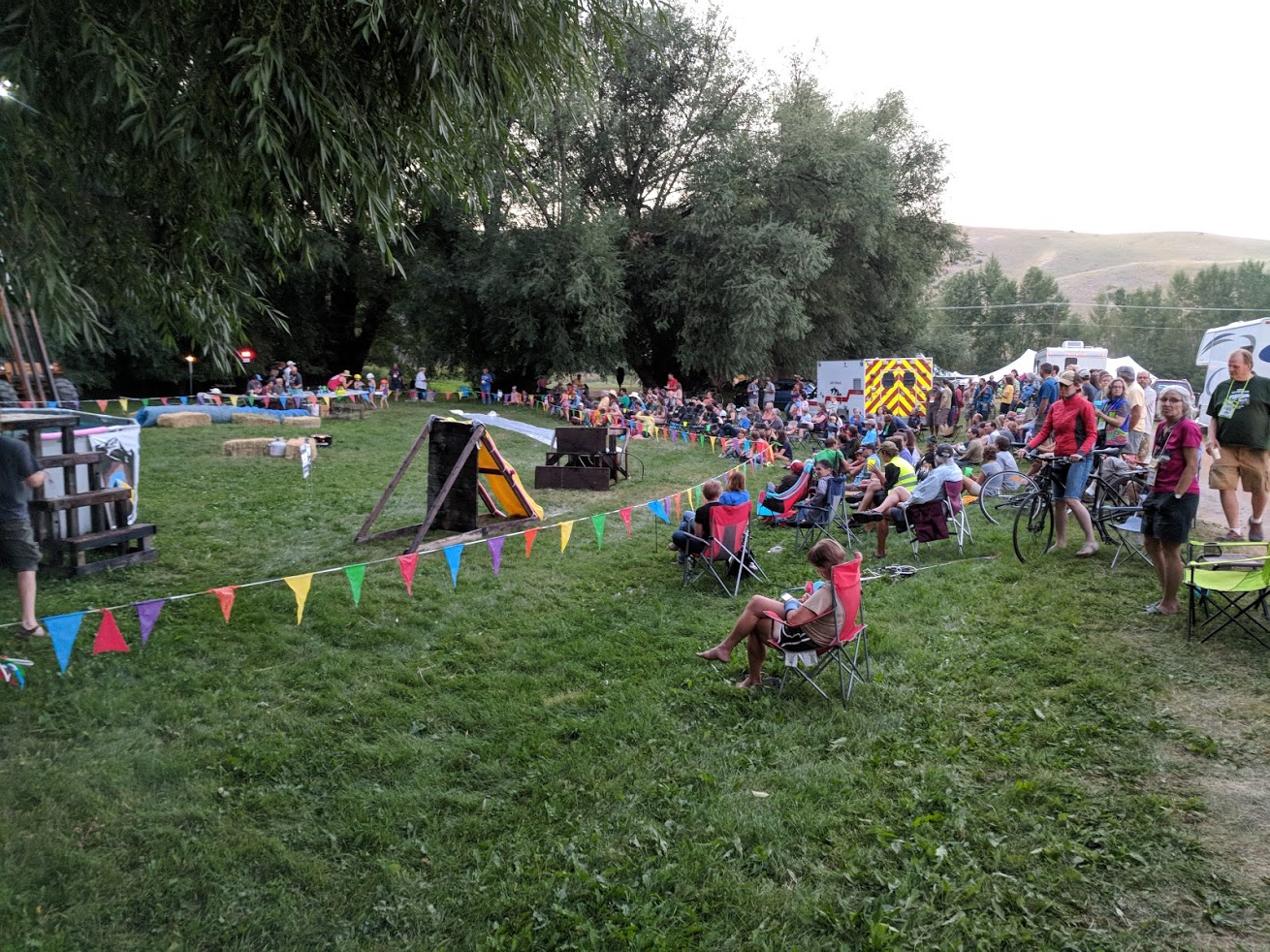
2018 "Speleolympics" competition

== See also ==
- Caving – Recreational pastime of exploring cave systems
- Speleology – Science of cave and karst systems
- Cave diving – Diving in water-filled caves
