= List of Alpha Gamma Rho chapters =

Alpha Gamma Rho is a social and professional agricultural fraternity. In the following list, active chapters are indicated in bold and inactive chapters are indicated in italics.

Chapter	Charter date and range	Institution	Location	Status	Ref.
**Alpha**	April 4, 1908	University of Illinois Urbana-Champaign	Champaign, Illinois	Active	(Note: Chapter formed from Delta Rho Sigma (local), established February 6, 1906. It merged with Alpha Gamma Rho (local) at Ohio State to form the fraternity.)
**Beta**	April 4, 1908	Ohio State University	Columbus, Ohio	Active	(Note: Chapter was organized as Alpha Gamma Rho (local), established in the fall of 1904. It merged with Delta Rho Sigma (local) at the University of Illinois to form the fraternity.)
**Gamma**	April 11, 1911	Pennsylvania State University	State College, Pennsylvania	Active	(Note: Chapter was formed from Alpha Alpha Epsilon (local), established in the spring of 1919.)
**Delta**	June 5, 1911	Purdue University	West Lafayette, Indiana	Active	(Note: Chapter formed from the Argonaut Club (local), established on April 19, 1907.)
**Epsilon**	March 24, 1913	North Dakota State University	Fargo, North Dakota	Active	(Note: Chapter formed from the Kadona Club (local), established in the fall of 1912.)
**Zeta**	February 14, 1914	Cornell University	Ithaca, New York	Active	(Note: Chapter formed from Caduceus (local), established in the fall of 1911.)
**Eta**	April 4, 1914	Iowa State University	Ames, Iowa	Active	(Note: Chapter formed from the A. G. R. Club (local), established in the winter of 1912 and 1913.)
**Theta**	April 24, 1916	University of Missouri	Columbia, Missouri	Active	(Note: Chapter formed from the Coleman Club (local), established in the spring of 1915.)
**Iota**	April 29, 1916	University of Wisconsin–Madison	Madison, Wisconsin	Active	(Note: Chapter formed from Beta Sigma Alpha (local), established in the winter of 1915 and 1916.)
**Kappa**	April 11, 1917	University of Nebraska–Lincoln	Lincoln, Nebraska	Active	(Note: Chapter formed from Ag Guild (local), established on October 13, 1916.)
Lambda	April 17, 1917	University of Minnesota	Saint Paul, Minnesota	Active	(Note: Chapter formed from Uta Ota Club (local), established in the fall of 1914.) (Note: Chapter was suspended by the university after the alcohol-related death of a student.)
Mu	April 28, 1917 – 1962	University of Massachusetts Amherst	Amherst, Massachusetts	Inactive	(Note: Chapter formed from Beta Kappa Phi (local), established on February 10, 1916.)
**Nu**	March 15, 1919	North Carolina State University	Raleigh, North Carolina	Active	(Note: Chapter formed from Theta Beta (local), established in the fall of 2016.)
**Xi**	April 28, 1919	Auburn University	Auburn, Alabama	Active	(Note: Chapter formed from Alpha Gamma (local), established in the fall of 1917.)
**Omicron**	May 29, 1920	University of Kentucky	Lexington, Kentucky	Active	(Note: Chapter formed from Beta Sigma Alpha (local), established in the fall of 1919.)
**Pi**	May 19, 1921	Oklahoma State University–Stillwater	Stillwater, Oklahoma	Active	(Note: Chapter formed from Sigma Alpha (local), established in September 1920.)
**Rho**	May 23, 1921	Colorado State University	Fort Collins, Colorado	Active	(Note: Chapter formed from the Argonaut Club (local), established winter in the winter of 1920 and 1921.)
**Sigma**	May 30, 1921	Washington State University	Pullman, Washington	Active	(Note: Chapter formed from A. G. R. Club (local), established December 13, 1920.)
**Tau**	April 14, 1922	Michigan State University	East Lansing, Michigan	Active	(Note: Chapter formed from Beta Sigma Alpha (local), established December 5, 1921.)
**Upsilon**	May 13, 1922 – 1952; 1958	University of Connecticut	Storrs, Connecticut	Active	(Note: Chapter formed Sigma Alpha Phi (local), established in 1910 as Pen and Scroll and reestablished in 1912 with a name change.)
**Phi**	May 1, 1923	University of California, Davis	Davis, California	Active	(Note: Chapter formed from the Alpha chapter of Kappa Tau.a Tau, established on December 4, 1919, as the K. T. Club (local).)
Chi (First)	May 2, 1923 – 1939	University of California, Berkeley	Berkeley, California	Inactive	(Note: Chapter formed from the Beta chapter of Kappa Tau, established February 4, 1922.)
**Psi**	February 20, 1924	University of Maine	Orono, Maine	Active	(Note: Chapter formed from Alpha Sigma Mu (local), established on April 3, 1923.)
**Omega**	April 21, 1924	University of New Hampshire	Durham, New Hampshire	Active	(Note: Chapter formed from Beta Sigma Alpha (local), established in November 1923)
**Alpha Alpha**	April 24, 1924 – 1932; 1949	West Virginia University	Morgantown, West Virginia	Active	(Note: Chapter formed from A. G. R. Club (local), established in February 1922.)
**Alpha Beta**	December 6, 1924 – 2016; 2022	Oregon State University	Corvallis, Oregon	Active	(Note: Chapter formed from the Kappa Tau (local), established as the Kai Tai Club in the spring of 1922; it changed its name in December 1923.) (Note: Chapter suspended for five years for hazing incidents dating back to 2012.)
**Alpha Gamma**	January 19, 1925	University of Florida	Gainesville, Florida	Active	(Note: Chapter formed from Alpha Gamma (local), established on March 31, 1924.)
**Alpha Delta**	1925	Montana State University	Bozeman, Montana	Active	(Note: Chapter formed from A G. R. Club (local), established in 1924.)
Alpha Epsilon	1926–1951; 1971–2017	Louisiana State University	Baton Rouge, Louisiana	Inactive	(Note: Chapter formed from Oo Too Tau Club (local), established in 1925. After going dormant, it reformed as a colony in 1963.) (Note: LSU suspended this chapter for violations surrounding the death of a student.)
**Alpha Zeta**	1927	Kansas State University	Manhattan, Kansas	Active	(Note: Chapter formed by absorbing Beta Alpha Sigma (local), established in 1924.)
**Alpha Eta**	1927–1934; 1938	University of Georgia	Athens, Georgia	Active	(Note: Chapter formed from Gamma Alpha (local), established in 1926. After going dormant, it reformed by absorbing Alpha Gamma (local), established in 1938.)
**Alpha Theta**	1928	University of Maryland, College Park	College Park, Maryland	Active	(Note: Chapter formed from the A. G. Club (local), established in 1924.)
**Alpha Iota**	1934	University of Arkansas	Fayetteville, Arkansas	Active	(Note: Chapter formed from the A. G. R. Club, established in 1931.)
**Alpha Kappa**	1951	University of Tennessee	Knoxville, Tennessee	Active	
**Alpha Lambda**	1951	New Mexico State University	Las Cruces, New Mexico	Active	
Alpha Mu	1952–1966	Rutgers University	New Jersey	Inactive	(Note: Chapter formed from Gamma Rho Alpha (local), established in 1950.)
**Alpha Nu**	1958	University of Connecticut	Storrs, Connecticut	Active	
Alpha Xi	1958–1980	Arizona State University	Tempe, Arizona	Inactive	(Note: Chapter formed from Alpha Gamma Alpha (local), established in 1954.)
Alpha Omicron	1959–1980; 19xx?–1991	Utah State University	Logan, Utah	Inactive	
**Alpha Pi**	1959	University of Arizona	Tucson, Arizona	Active	
**Alpha Rho**	1961	University of Vermont	Burlington, Vermont	Active	(Note: Chapter formed as a colony in 1959.)
**Alpha Sigma**	1963–2015, 2017	California State University, Fresno	Fresno, California	Active	(Note: Chapter formed from the A. G. R. Club (local), established in 1961.) (Note: Oregon State suspended the chapter in 2015 for hazing and underage drinking. The chapter was reinstated in late 2017.)
**Alpha Tau**	1963	Western Illinois University	Macomb, Illinois	Active	(Note: Chapter formed from Ag Ma Co (local), established in 1961.)
**Alpha Upsilon**	1963	University of Tennessee at Martin	Martin, Tennessee	Active	
**Alpha Phi**	1964	South Dakota State University	Brookings, South Dakota	Active	(Note: Chapter formed from Ag House (local), established in 1958.)
**Alpha Chi**	1966	Western Kentucky University	Bowling Green, Kentucky	Active	(Note: Chapter formed from Alpha Gamma Tau (local), established in 1962.)
**Alpha Psi**	1968	University of Wisconsin–River Falls	River Falls, Wisconsin	Active	
**Alpha Omega**	1968	Murray State University	Murray, Kentucky	Active	
**Beta Alpha**	1970	Southern Illinois University Carbondale	Carbondale, Illinois	Active	(Note: Chapter formed from Little Egypt Ag. Group (local), established in 1962.)
Beta Beta	1972–1980	Texas A&M University–Kingsville	Kingsville, Texas	Inactive	
**Beta Gamma**	1972	University of Wisconsin–Platteville	Platteville, Wisconsin	Active	
**Beta Delta**	1973–2018; 202x ?	Illinois State University	Normal, Illinois	Active	
**Beta Epsilon**	1973	Arkansas State University	Jonesboro, Arkansas	Active	(Note: Chapter formed from A. G. R. Club (local), established in 1969.)
Beta Zeta	1974–2023	Clemson University	Clemson, South Carolina	Active but under suspension until 2027	(Note: Clemson suspended the chapter for hazing.)
Chi	1975-2023	California Polytechnic State University, San Luis Obispo	San Luis Obispo, California	Inactive	(Note: Chapter formed as a colony in 1969.)
**Beta Eta**	1975	Virginia Tech	Blacksburg, Virginia	Active	
**Beta Theta**	1976	Middle Tennessee State University	Murfreesboro, Tennessee	Active	(Note: Chapter formed as a colony in 1972.)
**Beta Iota**	1978	Truman State University	Kirksville, Missouri	Active	
**Beta Kappa**	1978	California State University, Chico	Chico, California	Active	(Note: Chapter formed as a colony in 1967)
**Beta Lambda**	1980–1985, 1990	East Texas A&M University	Commerce, Texas	Active	(Note: Chapter formed from Alpha Sigma (local), established in 1965. After going dormant, it reformed as a colony in 1967.) (Note: Texas A&M University at Commerce changed its name to East Texas A&M University on 7 November 2024.)
**Beta Mu**	1983	Austin Peay State University	Clarksville, Tennessee	Active	
**Beta Nu**	1986	Texas A&M University	College Station, Texas	Active	
**Beta Xi**	1987	Texas Tech University	Lubbock, Texas	Active	(Note: Chapter formed as a colony in 1978.)
**Beta Omicron**	1988	University of Wyoming	Laramie, Wyoming	Active	
**Beta Pi**	1990–2001, 2012	Louisiana Tech University	Ruston, Louisiana	Active	
**Beta Rho**	1990	Northwest Missouri State University	Maryville, Missouri	Active	
**Beta Sigma**	1992	Tarleton State University	Stephenville, Texas	Active	
**Beta Tau**	1992	Mississippi State University	Starkville, Mississippi	Active	
**Beta Upsilon**	1992	University of Delaware	Newark, Delaware	Active	
**Beta Phi**	1998	University of Idaho	Moscow, Idaho	Active	
**Beta Chi**	2000	Stephen F. Austin State University	Nacogdoches, Texas	Active	
**Beta Psi**	2001	Delaware Valley University	Doylestown, Pennsylvania	Active	
**Beta Omega**	2003	Missouri State University	Springfield, Missouri	Active	
**Gamma Alpha**	2006	Florida Southern College	Lakeland, Florida	Active	
**Gamma Beta**	2005	Fort Hays State University	Hays, Kansas	Active	
**Gamma Gamma**	2010	Southern Arkansas University	Magnolia, Arkansas	Active	
**Gamma Delta**	2011	Abraham Baldwin Agricultural College	Tifton, Georgia	Active	
**Gamma Epsilon**	2014	Sam Houston State University	Huntsville, Texas	Active	
**Gamma Zeta**	2018	Arkansas Tech University	Russellville, Arkansas	Active	
**Gamma Eta**	2020	State University of New York at Cobleskill	Cobleskill, New York	Active	
