= Bramanville Mill =

- U.S. National Register of Historic Places
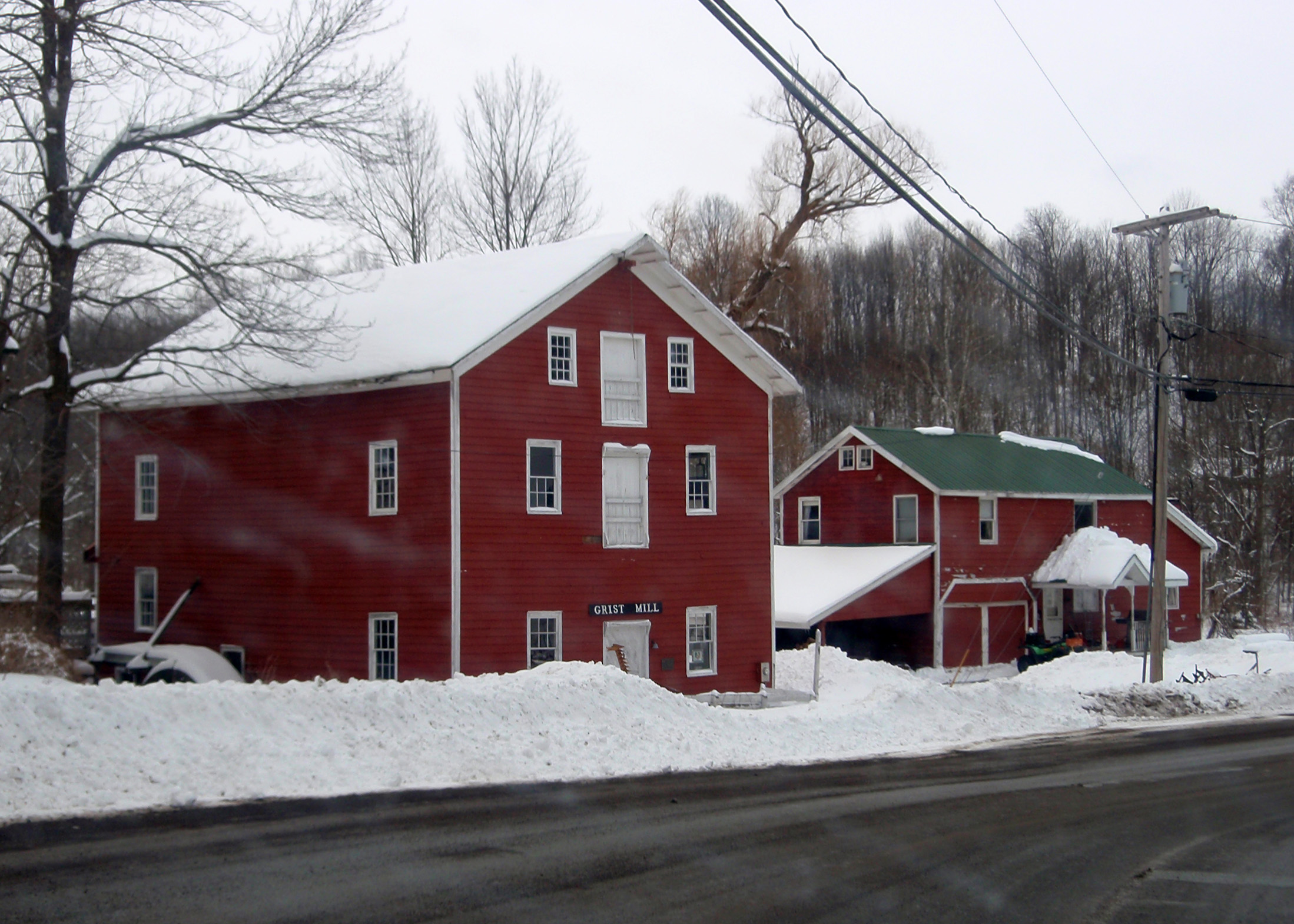
- Bramanville Mill, February 2011

- Location within New York Location within the United States
- Location: East of Cobleskill on Caverns Rd., Cobleskill, New York
- Coordinates: 42°41′17″N 74°24′22″W
- Area: less than one acre
- Built: 1816
- Architect: Eckerson, Nelson
- NRHP reference No.: 76001276
- Added to NRHP: August 27, 1976

Bramanville Mill, also known as Chickering Grist Mill, is a historic grist mill located at Cobleskill in Schoharie County, New York.

== Overview ==
The mill building is a 30 foot by 50 foot, rectangular, gable roofed wood-frame building, two and one half stories on the end facing the road.

It was listed on the National Register of Historic Places in 1976.

== See also ==
- Historic Places in the USA
