= Cobleskill Historic District =

Historic district in New York, United States

- U.S. National Register of Historic Places
- U.S. Historic district
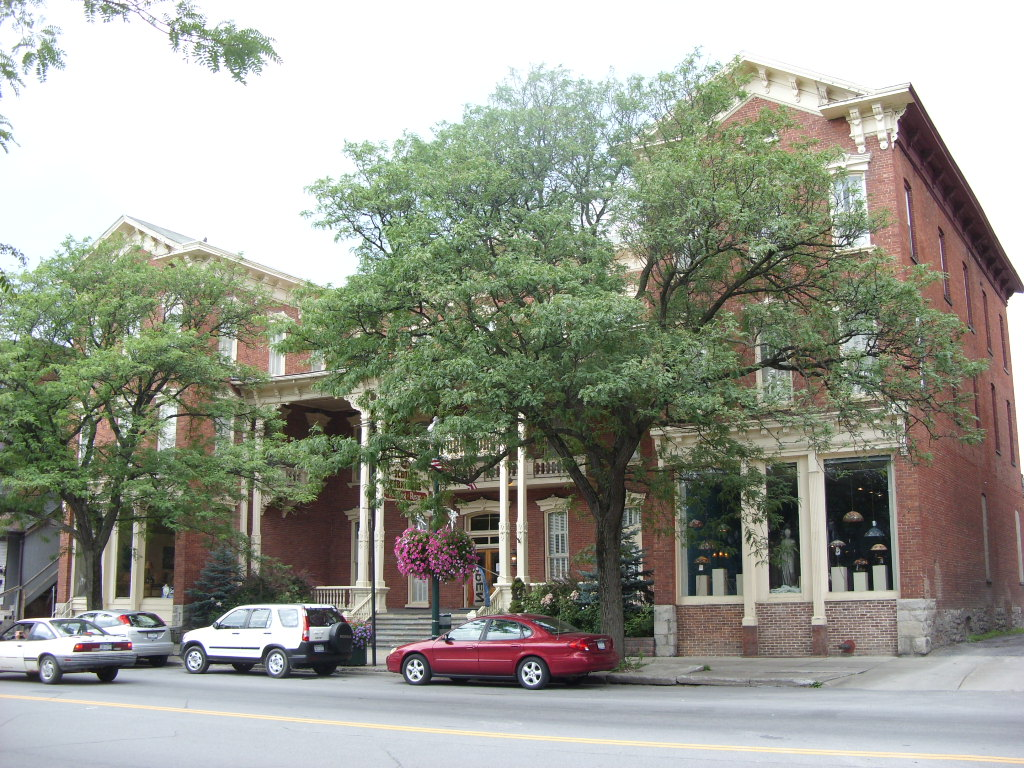
- Hotel Augustan, July 2008

- Location within New York Location within the United States
- Location: Irregular pattern along Washington Ave., Main, Grand, and Elm Sts., Cobleskill, New York
- Coordinates: 42°40′41″N 74°29′3″W
- Area: 92.5 acres (37.4 ha)
- Built: 1865
- Architect: Multiple
- Architectural style: Mid 19th Century Revival, Late 19th And 20th Century Revivals, Late Victorian
- NRHP reference No.: 78001910
- Added to NRHP: September 18, 1978

Cobleskill Historic District is a national historic district located at Cobleskill in Schoharie County, New York. The district includes 180 contributing buildings and eight contributing sites. It encompasses a commercial area, several residential streets, churches, an old school, a railroad, and a fairgrounds. The area includes a small stream that runs through a park containing a millpond. The focal point of the community is the 1874 Hotel Augustan, now used for commercial purposes. The oldest building is the Bull's Head Inn, built in 1802.

It was added to the National Register of Historic Places in 1978.
