= Someecards =

E-cards website

someecards.com
- Website type: E-cards
- Available in: English
- Creators: Brook Lundy and Duncan Mitchell
- Website: Official Website
- Commercial: yes
- Registration: not required
- Launched: April 18, 2007

Someecards.com is a free online e-cards service created by Brook Lundy and Duncan Mitchell. The content of Someecards consists of parodies of the sentiments found in the traditional Hallmark greeting card, sometimes features content that could be considered offensive if taken seriously. Someecard's deadpan humor has drawn widespread approval from those for whom traditional greeting and Ecards do not appeal, especially younger urban audiences. The cards are divided into many categories, including events for which one might send a real greeting card, such as birthdays, weddings, and holidays. The categories also contain cards for unusual occasions, such as after a breakup, to flirt, and as a "cry for help". Compete.com reported that Someecards.com received over 570,000 visitors in October 2011.

As of September 2018 the "create card" feature, where visitors can create their own custom ecards, has been removed from the website.
