= Cobleskill (village), New York =

Cobleskill, New York
- Village
- Location within the state of New York
- Coordinates: 42°40′45″N 74°29′8″W
- Country: United States
- State: New York
- County: Schoharie County, New York
- Incorporated: 1868

Government
  - Type: Mayor/Board of Trustees
  - Mayor: Rebecca Stanton-Terk

Area
  - Total: 3.57 sq mi (9.24 km^{2})
  - Land: 3.56 sq mi (9.23 km^{2})
  - Water: 0.0039 sq mi (0.01 km^{2})
- Elevation: 922 ft (281 m)

Population (2020)
  - Total: 4,173
  - Density: 1,170.6/sq mi (451.98/km^{2})
- Time zone: UTC-5 (Eastern (EST))
  - Summer (DST): UTC-4 (EDT)
- ZIP code: 12043
- Area code: 518
- FIPS code: 36-16628
- GNIS feature ID: 0946981
- Website: Village of Cobleskill, NY

Cobleskill is a village in the western part of the town of Cobleskill in Schoharie County, New York, United States. The population was 4,678 at the 2010 census.

The village is southwest of Amsterdam. The State University of New York at Cobleskill is located at the western side of the village.

== History ==
The village was settled in 1752, and was incorporated in 1868.

It is generally accepted that a German grist miller named Jacob Kobel (variated as Kobus, or Coble) built a mill on the Cobleskill Creek. The Dutch word for river or creek is kill, thus the name Cobleskill, for "Cobel's creek".

The Schoharie County Sunshine Fair, formerly known as the Cobleskill Sunshine Fair, has been held annually in Cobleskill since 1876. An agricultural fair, it draws tens of thousands of people to attractions such as livestock shows, demolition derbies and tractor pulls.

The Cobleskill Historic District was listed on the National Register of Historic Places in 1978.

== Geography ==
According to the United States Census Bureau, the village has a total area of 3.3 square miles (8.5 km^{2}), all land.

A USGS Benchmark on the side of southeastern corner of the William H. Golding 6-8 Middle School is marked at 1028 feet above sea level. The valley Cobleskill is situated in, is on the boundary of the geologic regions of New York known as the Catskill plateau to the south, and the Escarpment region of the Mohawk Valley to the North.

Cobleskill is north of the Cobleskill Creek.

New York State Route 10 and New York State Route 7 intersect New York State Route 145 in the village. Interstate 88 passes south of the village.

== Demographics ==
Historical population
Census	Pop.	Note	%±
1870	1,030		—
1880	1,232		19.6%
1890	1,822		47.9%
1900	2,327		27.7%
1910	2,088		−10.3%
1920	2,410		15.4%
1930	2,594		7.6%
1940	2,617		0.9%
1950	3,208		22.6%
1960	3,471		8.2%
1970	4,368		25.8%
1980	5,272		20.7%
1990	5,268		−0.1%
2000	4,533		−14.0%
2010	4,678		3.2%
2020	4,173		−10.8%
U.S. Decennial Census

As of the census of 2000, there were 4,533 people, 1,537 households, and 794 families residing in the village. The population density was 1,386.3 inhabitants per square mile (535.3/km^{2}). There were 1,706 housing units at an average density of 521.7 per square mile (201.4/km^{2}). The racial makeup of the village was 90.75% White, 4.23% Black or African American, 0.24% Native American, 1.39% Asian, 0.07% Pacific Islander, 0.66% from other races, and 1.35% from two or more races. Hispanic or Latino of any race were 3.03% of the population.

There were 1,537 households, out of which 23.6% had children under the age of 18 living with them, 35.7% were married couples living together, 10.0% had a female householder with no husband present, and 50.9% were non-families. 41.8% of all households were made up of individuals, and 20.6% had someone living alone who was 65 years of age or older. The average household size was 2.07 and the average family size was 2.85.

In the village, the population was spread out, with 15.8% under the age of 18, 32.6% from 18 to 24, 18.1% from 25 to 44, 16.4% from 45 to 64, and 17.2% who were 65 years of age or older. The median age was 27 years. For every 100 females, there were 91.3 males. For every 100 females age 18 and over, there were 89.8 males.

The median income for a household in the village was $28,011, and the median income for a family was $43,714. Males had a median income of $29,375 versus $29,712 for females. The per capita income for the village was $15,213. About 11.3% of families and 19.8% of the population were below the poverty line, including 17.8% of those under age 18 and 10.6% of those age 65 or over.
