= Cobleskill, New York =

Cobleskill
- Town
- Location in Schoharie County and the state of New York.
- Coordinates (seat of town government): 42°40′49″N 74°25′03″W
- Country: United States
- State: New York
- County: Schoharie
- Settled: c. 1750
- Established: 1795

Government
  - Body: Town board
  - Supervisor: Leo T. McAllister (Republican Party)

Area
  - Total: 30.78 sq mi (79.73 km^{2})
  - Land: 30.61 sq mi (79.27 km^{2})
  - Water: 0.18 sq mi (0.46 km^{2})
- Elevation: 886 ft (270 m)

Population (2020)
  - Total: 6,086
- Time zone: UTC-5 (EST)
  - Summer (DST): UTC-4 (EDT)
- Area code: 518
- FIPS code: 36-16639
- GNIS feature ID: 0978843
- Website: Town website

Cobleskill is a town in Schoharie County, New York, United States. The population was 6,086 at the 2020 census. The town contains a village, also named Cobleskill, as well as the State University of New York at Cobleskill.

The town is in the northern part of the county and is southwest of Amsterdam.

== History ==
The town was first settled around 1712. The town was founded at the same time as the county, 1795, but its boundaries were not established until 1801. There are more historical notes on the pages of the village of Cobleskill and Schoharie County.

The town was named after mill owner Jacob Kobell, and the word "kil", which is Dutch for stream. Cobleskill was incorporated in 1868.

=== Battle of Cobleskill ===
The Battle of Cobleskill (also called the Cobleskill massacre) was an American Revolutionary War raid on the frontier settlement of Cobleskill on May 30, 1778. The Cobleskill militia, along with a detachment of Continentals, were reconnoitering near George Warner's house when they encountered a small party of Iroquois warriors. The soldiers pursued the warriors for about a mile when 200-300 Iroquois and Loyalists, led by Mohawk war leader Joseph Brant, opened fire on the rebels. Of the 40 or so rebels, only about 11 escaped without major injury.

== Geography ==
According to the United States Census Bureau, the town has a total area of 30.8 square miles (80 km^{2}), of which 30.6 square miles (79 km^{2}) is land and 0.2 square miles (0.52 km^{2}) (0.49%) is water.

Cobleskill Creek flows eastward through the town. Interstate 88 passes across the town. New York State Route 145 is an east–west highway, which runs conjointly with New York State Route 10 near Cobleskill village. Both the Interstate and NY-10 follow a route similar to Cobleskill Creek.

== Demographics ==
Historical population
Census	Pop.	Note	%±
1820	2,440		—
1830	2,988		22.5%
1840	3,583		19.9%
1850	2,229		−37.8%
1860	2,357		5.7%
1870	2,847		20.8%
1880	3,370		18.4%
1890	3,443		2.2%
1900	3,973		15.4%
1910	3,579		−9.9%
1920	3,798		6.1%
1930	3,980		4.8%
1940	4,005		0.6%
1950	4,709		17.6%
1960	4,964		5.4%
1970	6,017		21.2%
1980	7,048		17.1%
1990	7,270		3.1%
2000	6,407		−11.9%
2010	6,625		3.4%
2020	6,086		−8.1%
U.S. Decennial Census 2020

As of the census of 2000, there were 6,407 people, 2,270 households, and 1,287 families residing in the town. The population density was 209.3 inhabitants per square mile (80.8/km^{2}). There were 2,509 housing units at an average density of 81.9 per square mile (31.6/km^{2}). The racial makeup of the town was 94.76% White, 3.62% Black or African American, 0.25% Native American, 1.01% Asian, 0.06% Pacific Islander, 0.53% from other races, and 1.17% from two or more races. Hispanic or Latino of any race were 3.34% of the population.

There were 2,270 households, out of which 26.5% had children under the age of 18 living with them, 43.1% were married couples living together, 10.0% had a female householder with no husband present, and 43.3% were non-families. 35.2% of all households were made up of individuals, and 17.0% had someone living alone who was 65 years of age or older. The average household size was 2.23 and the average family size was 2.90.

In the town, the population was spread out, with 18.4% under the age of 18, 24.9% from 18 to 24, 20.6% from 25 to 44, 19.7% from 45 to 64, and 16.4% who were 65 years of age or older. The median age was 33 years. For every 100 females, there were 93.1 males. For every 100 females age 18 and over, there were 92.0 males.

The median income for a household in the town was $32,764, and the median income for a family was $46,875. Males had a median income of $32,708 versus $24,864 for females. The per capita income for the town was $17,246. About 9.2% of families and 15.3% of the population were below the poverty line, including 18.1% of those under age 18 and 7.6% of those age 65 or over.

== Arts and culture ==
=== Annual cultural events ===
Two annual festivals held in Cobleskill are the Schoharie County Maple Festival and the Sunshine Fair.

=== Tourism ===
Two cavern complexes are located just outside Cobleskill and are open to tourists: Howe Caverns and Secret Caverns. Both are north of I-88 and Howes Cave. Secret Caverns is located just outside Cobleskill, and was formed during the last Ice Age. The caverns were discovered in 1928, and include a 100-foot underground waterfall. Howe Caverns is 156 feet below ground.

== Media ==
- Times Journal of Cobleskill—weekly newspaper which is published every Wednesday.
- WCSQ-LP—Radio Cobleskill 105.9 FM, local radio station

== Notable people ==
- George H. Durand, U. S. Representative from Michigan
- Boris McGiver, actor, born in Cobleskill.
- Harvey Putnam, U. S. Representative from New York

== Communities and locations in the Town of Cobleskill ==
- Barnerville – A hamlet in the eastern part of the town, west of Bramanville on County Road 8.
- Bramanville – A hamlet in the eastern section of the town, west of Howes Cave on County Road 8. The Bramanville Mill was listed on the National Register of Historic Places in 1976.
- Cobleskill – A village located at the junction of NY-10 and NY-145 in the western part of the town.
- Cobleskill Reservoir – A reservoir east of Mineral Springs.
- East Cobleskill – A hamlet in the southeastern part of the town at the town line on NY-145.
- Greenbush – A location south of Mineral Springs.
- Howe's Cave – A hamlet near the eastern town line on County Road 8. The name is taken from that of from early settler Lester Howe.
- Lawyersville – A hamlet northwest of Cobleskill village, located on NY-145. The village is named after some early settlers.
- Mineral Springs – A hamlet south of Cobleskill village. It was originally called "Frances Corners."
- Russell Lake – A small lake at the northwestern corner of Cobleskill.
- Sagendorf Corners – A location north of Howes Cave.
- Shutts Corners – A location northeast of Cobleskill village.

== See also ==
- Cobleskill-Richmondville Central School District
