= Times Journal of Cobleskill =

Weekly newspaper

- "The News of Schoharie County"
- Type: Weekly newspaper
- Owner: Mark Vinciguerra
- Founded: 1877
- Headquarters: Cobleskill, NY, United States
- Circulation: 4,870 (as of 2017)
- Website: cobleskilltimesjournal.com

The Times Journal of Cobleskill is a weekly newspaper published every Thursday that covers news concerning Schoharie County of New York.

== History ==
The Cobleskill Herald was first published in 1877. After going through several owners, the Herald was bought by Erwin B. Hard in 1885. Soon after purchasing the paper, Hard renamed it to the Cobleskill Times. Charles L. Ryder bought the paper in 1919, and also went on to purchase the Cherry Valley Gazette and the Sharon Springs Record, and merged these papers with the Cobleskill Times.

In 1946, the Schoharie County Journal merged with the Cobleskill Times to form the Times Journal. The Journal was in the Ryder family until 1979, when Richard Sanford purchased it.

In July 1992, Jim Poole became owner and publisher of the paper. He sold the newspaper in September 2024 to Mark Vinciguerra, owner of Capital Region Independent Media.
