= Lists of Women's March locations =

- List of 2017 Women's March locations
  - List of 2017 Women's March locations outside the United States
- List of 2018 Women's March locations
- List of 2019 Women's March locations
- List of 2020 Women's March locations
  - List of 2020 Women's March locations (October)
- List of 2021 Women's March locations
- List of 2022 Women's March locations

== Individual events ==
- 2017 Lincoln Nebraska Women's March
- Women's March on Portland (2017)
- Women's March on Seattle (2017)
