= List of 2017 Women's March locations =

The 2017 Women's March was a network of global political rallies that took place in cities around the world on January 21, 2017. These "sister marches" were both formally and organically related to the popularized 2017 Women's March, all of which happened in concert. The date of this global protest is particularly significant because it was the first day of President Donald J. Trump's term. In addition, the protest was largely in response the positions of the new presidency and the results of the 2016 presidential election. The march was also about promoting women's rights. Other noted causes included, but were not limited to: immigration reform, climate science, and health care reform, countering religious discrimination, violence against women, LGBTQ abuse, addressing racial inequities (e.g. Black Lives Matter), workers' issues, and environmental issues.

== United States ==
Listed below are 588 marches in the U.S. in support of the 2017 Women's March.

- AL
- AK
- AZ
- AR
- CA
- CO
- CT
- DE
- DC
- FL
- GA
- GU
- HI
- ID
- IL
- IN
- IA
- KS
- KY
- LA
- ME
- MD
- MA
- MI
- MN
- MS
- MO
- MT
- NE
- NV
- NH
- NJ
- NM
- NY
- NC
- ND
- OH
- OK
- OR
- PA
- PR
- RI
- SC
- SD
- TN
- TX
- UT
- VT
- VI
- VA
- WA
- WV
- WI
- WY

State	Cities	Photo	Approximate attendance	Notes
Washington, D.C.			470,000 – 1,000,000	The March began at Independence Avenue at the southwest corner of the Capitol building, and continued along the National Mall. Virginia Gov. Terry McAuliffe announced that he would attend the Washington march instead of Trump's inaugural parade. McAuliffe said he would be marching with his wife Dorothy, Lt. Gov. Ralph Northam and Cecile Richards, president of the Planned Parenthood Federation of America. Mayor Muriel Bowser spoke before the crowds. The 2017 Women's March on Washington was likely the largest single-day demonstration in recorded U.S. history. There were no arrests.
Alabama	Birmingham		5,000–10,000	Kelly Ingram Park
Alabama	Huntsville		100	Protesters assembled on a street corner.
Alabama	Mentone		70+	intersection of Alabama Highway 89 and 117. There were around 50 people out of the total population of 360 that showed up.
Alabama	Mobile		900–1,000	Protesters assembled in Public Safety Memorial Park and the march lasted approximately 30 minutes.
Alaska	Adak		10	Ten people demonstrated at the westernmost city in the Aleutian Islands.
Alaska	Anchorage		3,500	Thousands protested at the Delaney Park Strip.
Alaska	Bethel		75–100	Participants marched from the Cultural Center to the Bethel Native Corporation, in -25 temperatures and with signs in both English and Yup'ik.
Alaska	Cordova		108+	Main St.
Alaska	Craig		25	Dozens of people came out for the Women's March in Craig.
Alaska	Fairbanks		2,000	People rallied in subzero temperatures.
Alaska	Gustavus		105	The march began at the "Welcome to Gustavus" sign by the airport and ended at the Sunnyside at 4 Corners Approximately 100 of the town's 400 residents showed up.
Alaska	Haines		150 – 170	The march took place despite cold and windy conditions.
Alaska	Homer		900	WKFL Park on Heath Street
Alaska	Juneau		1,000	Alaska State Capitol – Juneau Arts and Humanities Council building
Alaska	Ketchikan		220	Ketchikan's downtown cruise dock
Alaska	Kodiak		330	The march began in the high school parking lot, looped around downtown and ended at the library.
Alaska	Kotzebue		35–36	Above the Arctic Circle, with a temperature of –51, locals in Kotzebue walked along the shore; a couple people got frostbite.
Alaska	Moose Pass		15	
Alaska	Nome		80 – 100	Front Street across from the post office – front lawn of Old St. Joe's; temperatures approximately −20 °F (−29 °C)
Alaska	Palmer		900–1,000	Turkey Red restaurant
Alaska	Seldovia		45	
Alaska	Seward		54–70	people marched in a snowstorm in Seward, AK
Alaska	Sitka		700	Hundreds marched down Lincoln Street from Crescent Harbor shelter to St. Michael's Cathedral, then back past Crescent Harbor shelter to St. Peter's See House.
Alaska	Skagway		112	Organizer Annie Kidd Matsov stated that turnout was much higher than expected.
Alaska	Soldotna		200–322	Participants started at the library and marched along part of the Kenai Spur Highway that looped back to the library. The march was followed by a community gathering in the library.
Alaska	Talkeetna		80	Fairview Inn
Alaska	Unalakleet		38	Demonstrators marched in the village, where the temperature was −40 degrees Fahrenheit with the wind chill factor.
Alaska	Unalaska		80	Captains Bay Bridge – City Hall
Alaska	Utqiagvik		60	Participants in Alaska's northernmost city (formerly named Barrow until December 2016) braved temperatures that reached 16 below zero to take part in the event.
Alaska	Valdez		100–140	
Arizona	Ajo		250	Ajo Plaza
Arizona	Bisbee			event planned at Grassy Park
Arizona	Flagstaff		1,200 – 2,000	Flagstaff City Hall – Heritage Square. Despite nearly two feet of snow, a biting wind and initial guesses that Flagstaff's "March for Love" would only attract 200 people, the Flagstaff Police Department estimated that up to 2,000 people attended.
Arizona	Gold Canyon		20+	Montesa Residential Community March in Pinal County
Arizona	Green Valley		400 – 500+	Possibly "the largest rally in Green Valley history," it occupied all four corners and medians at intersection of Esperanza Boulevard and La Canada Drive.
Arizona	Jerome		85–100	The Parade Steps and Upper Park
Arizona	Lake Havasu City		30	march down McCulloch Boulevard, from Acoma to the London Bridge and back
Arizona	Phoenix		20,000	The march progressed from the Capitol south to Jefferson, east to 15th Avenue, north to Monroe Street, west to 17th Avenue and back to the Capitol. Speakers at rallies before and after the march included State Rep. Athena Salman (Tempe), U.S. Rep. Ruben Gallego, disability-rights activist Jennifer Longdon (who noted that moments after Trump was sworn in as the 45th president of the United States, the White House website was overhauled to remove pages dedicated to disabilities, civil rights & LGBT issues), Jodi Liggett, Planned Parenthood's vice president of public affairs, and Maricopa County Recorder Adrian Fontes.
Arizona	Prescott		1,200	Protesters marched around the courthouse.
Arizona	Sedona		hundreds	45 Birch Blvd – marching 89A to first traffic light in uptown
Arizona	Show Low		1	One person held her own protest in Show Low, AZ
Arizona	Tucson		15,000	The march began at Armory Park with 5,000 people, and ended with the Tucson Solidarity Rally at Jacome Plaza near Joel D.Valdez Library, by which time, according to police, the crowd size had tripled. The demonstration was peaceful, with no incidents or arrests reported. Speakers at the rally included US Rep. Raul Grijalva.
Arizona	Yuma		nearly 300	march held on February 5 at Kennedy Park
Arkansas	Bentonville		500+	Bentonville Square
Arkansas	Fayetteville		100+	Hundreds rallied outside of the Washington County Courthouse.
Arkansas	Helena		2	
Arkansas	Little Rock		7,000	Protesters marched to the Arkansas State Capitol Building.
California	Alameda		8	
California	Albany		500	Ocean View Elementary School
California	Avalon		44	
California	Bakersfield		200	corner of California Avenue and Stockdale Highway
California	Berkeley		200 – 1,000	Hundreds of people showed up on UC Berkeley's campus at Memorial Glade near Doe Library, only to discover that the online rally posting on Action Network had been faked by a prankster who later identified himself (perhaps falsely) as a Russian national. But even without a real event organizer or official marching permit for the city streets, this did not deter people from spontaneously marching all around the college campus.
California	Beverly Hills		250 – 300	Rally planned at cross intersection of Wilshire Blvd & Santa Monica Blvd.
California	Bishop		580	Eastern Sierra Women's March; Bishop City Park – City Hall
California	Borrego Springs		140–150	Borrego Springs Road
California	Burbank		300	Chandler Walk Bike Way, Mariposa Blvd – Hollywood Way
California	Cambria		100	Veterans Memorial Building – march down Main Street toward East Village
California	Carmel		few hundred	(Fri, Jan 20) On the day of Trump's inauguration, the People's Rally for Unity & Equality was held inside the Unitarian Universalist Church.
California	Chico		2,000–4,000	Thousands packed the Chico City Plaza, and later marched from Fifth St to Broadway St.
California	Compton		~40	
California	El Centro		100	rally at Cardenas Market
California	Encinitas		50	A march with 50 senior citizens took place at the Seacrest Village retirement center.
California	Eureka		5,000 – 8,000	At the dawn of the march, Eureka Police Department estimated nearly 2,000 people at the C Street Market Square. That number grew throughout the march to around 8,000.
California	Fairfax		25–60	intersection of Broadway and Bolinas Rd
California	Fort Bragg		2,500–2,800	The Mendocino Coast Women's March began at Town Hall and ended at Eagles Hall.
California	Fresno		2,000	Protesters gathered at an intersection in North Fresno.
California	Gualala		300	event held outside the Old Post Office
California	Hemet		100+	Democratic Headquarters - Hemet City Hall
California	Isla Vista		500	(Jan. 20) At UC Santa Barbara, a few hundred students left class at midday Friday and gathered at Campbell Hall before marching into Anisq’Oyo Park.
California	June Lake		dozen	At Ohanas 395 & JLB parking lot, a dozen protestors come out, pulling kids in sleds on the snowy streets.
California	Kings Beach		500–800	North Tahoe Event Center – Highway 28 – Kings Beach Boat Ramp
California	Laguna Beach		1,000 – 4,000	Hundreds attended the march at Main Beach.
California	Laytonville		25+	
California	Long Beach		200	Harvey Milk Park – Promenade Square; march organized by The May Day Long Beach Coalition
California	Lompoc		300	Protesters lined all four corners of H Street & Ocean Avenue.
California	Los Angeles	Demonstrators fill streets, sidewalks, and plazas on a sunny day. A tall, white building stands in the background.	750,000	Pershing Square – City Hall. The Los Angeles Police Department stated that "well past" 100,000 people attended the march, but did not attempt to make a more specific estimate. Officials stated that the march was the largest in Los Angeles since a 2006 immigration march attended by 500,000 people. The Los Angeles Daily News reported that 750,000 people were in the crowd. Organizers also said that 750,000 people had participated in the march.
California	Modesto		1,000	The march from McHenry and East Briggsmore Avenues to Graceada Park was planned less than a week in advance, and drew a crowd of nearly 1,000 people.
California	Mt. Shasta		400+	Parker Plaza
California	Napa		3,000+	Protesters lined up roads in downtown Napa, from Oxbow Public Market to Veterans Memorial Park.
California	Nevada City		100+	Broad Street bridge over Highway 49 – Commercial Street
California	Oakhurst		200	Protesters lined the road to Yosemite National Park from Oakhurst, near Madera, California.
California	Oakland		100,000	Madison Park – Frank Ogawa Plaza (via western shore of Lake Merritt, from Grand Ave to Broadway). About 100,000 people marched in Oakland, extending 40 city blocks; BART had to add six extra trains to accommodate the throngs of people.
California	Ontario		200	Ontario City Hall – Euclid Avenue median on Euclid Avenue and F Street
California	Pacifica		1,000	Pacifica Community Center – highway to Linda Mar Boulevard
California	Palm Desert		< 1,000	Civic Center Park – Fred Waring Drive – Westfield Mall – El Paseo
California	Palm Springs		250 – 600	Frances Stevens park; later merged with the Palm Desert Women's March.
California	Palmdale		few dozen	Antelope Valley Mall
California	Pasadena		500+	After amassing on the steps of Pasadena City Hall for an hour, hundreds of people boarded the Metro Gold Line at stations all along the 210 Freeway for the major rally in downtown Los Angeles.
California	Point Reyes Station		60	Wells Fargo Bank, across from Yellow House/Town Commons
California	Quincy		100+	Plumas County Court House
California	Redding		300	Redding City Hall – Interstate 5
California	Redondo Beach		1,800	245 N Harbor Drive – corner of Harbor Drive and Portofino Way
California	Redwood City		5,000	The rally was "inspired by and held in solidarity with" Saturday's Women's March on Washington, organizers said. Joan Baez performed and Rep. Anna Eshoo (D-Menlo Park) and state Senator Jerry Hill (D-San Mateo) spoke.
California	Ridgecrest		180–200	corner of China Lake and Drummond – Petroglyph Park
California	Riverside		4,000	Thousands marched along the Downtown Main Street Mall.
California	Sacramento		20,000	20,000 marched from Southside Park to the California State Capitol.
California	Salinas		80	(Jan. 20) Closter Park. Salinas Mayor Joe Gunter spoke at the event.
California	San Bernardino		80	San Bernardino City Unified School District Board of Education
California	San Clemente		several hundred	Avenida Del Mar; one organizer said that 652 had attended.
California	San Diego	Marchers with signs walk down a street from right to left. Buildings and palm trees stand in the background.	30,000–40,000	In downtown San Diego, an estimated 30,000 to 40,000 marched from Civic Center Plaza, along Broadway and Harbor Drive, to the County Administration Center. State Sen. Toni Atkins (D-San Diego) spoke at the event.
California	San Francisco		100,000–150,000	The rally was held at Civic Center Plaza, where San Francisco City Hall was lit pink in observance of the protest. Performer and activist Joan Baez serenaded the crowd with "We Shall Overcome" in Spanish.
California	San Jose		25,000	City Hall plaza – Plaza de Cesar Chavez. San Jose Mayor Sam Liccardo tweeted an overhead photo of a "beautiful crowd" around City Hall, and added a hashtag that said "This is what democracy looks like."
California	San Leandro			(Fri, Jan 20) march planned: San Leandro BART Station – San Leandro City Hall
California	San Luis Obispo		7,000–10,000	In spite of pouring rain, protesters gathered at Mitchell Park, at the corner of Pismo and Osos Streets, then marched a 1-mile loop along Marsh, Broad & Higuera Streets.
California	San Marcos		3,000 – 10,000	San Marcos Civic Center – Palomar College. Fewer than 2,000 were expected, but the turnout was so large that instead of walking on sidewalks along Mission Ave, as was planned and permitted, people flooded the street, shutting down half the lanes to traffic, for 1.7 miles.
California	San Rafael		500	(Jan 20) rallies planned at San Rafael & B Street Community Theater
California	Santa Ana		20,000–25,000	Throngs of people marched along Fourth St and past the Ronald Reagan Federal Building and US Courthouse.
California	Santa Barbara		6,000+	Thousands of women and men participated in a rally at De La Guerra Plaza. Speakers included Santa Barbara Mayor Helene Schneider, Councilmember Cathy Murillo, and State Assemblywoman Monique Limón.
California	Santa Cruz		15,000+	Santa Cruz City Hall – Pacific Avenue and Louden Nelson Community Center. Several people commented that it was the largest march in Santa Cruz history.
California	Santa Rosa		5,000	People marched through downtown Santa Rosa. Former representative Lynn Woolsey and Representative Jared Huffman spoke.
California	Seaside		2,000 – 4,000	Women's March CSU Monterey Bay began at Main Quad and ended with a rally inside the Otter Sports Complex.
California	Sonoma		3,000	Marchers proceeded around the historic Sonoma Plaza, blocking traffic for over an hour.
California	South Lake Tahoe		500 – 700	Hard Rock Hotel & Casino in Stateline, Nevada – South Lake Tahoe Senior Center.
California	Truckee		150	
California	Ukiah		2,000	Attendees gathered at Alex R. Thomas Jr. Plaza. Joelle Schultz, director of Ukiah's Planned Parenthood, addressed the crowd along with local activists.
California	Vallejo		40	Vallejo Ferry Building – City Hall
California	Ventura		2,500	Plaza Park – Mission Park, via Thompson Boulevard
California	Visalia		500	A demonstration occurred at Blain Park.
California	Walnut Creek		10,000	Streets were closed as thousands marched in downtown Walnut Creek. Speakers at the march included state Senators Nancy Skinner and Steve Glazer, and US Reps Eric Swalwell and Mark DeSaulnier.
California	Watsonville		300–500	On Thursday, Jan 19, hundreds gathered for a rally dubbed "Hands Around the [Watsonville] Plaza – Unity Through Diversity." On Saturday morning, Jan 21, over a hundred people rallied again at the Watsonville Plaza before boarding a bus to the Santa Cruz March.
California	Willits		60	Willits arch
California	Winters		200	
California	Yucca Valley		100	corner of Twentynine Palms Highway and Old Woman Springs Road
Colorado	Alamosa		350	The march began at the corner of Hwy. 160 and Richardson Avenue in Alamosa, went down and around the hospital, and back to the campus.
Colorado	Aspen		500 – 1,000	Protesters marched to Wagner Park.
Colorado	Broomfield		225	Mamie Doud Eisenhower Public Library; loop around the pond
Colorado	Carbondale		700	A mile-long line of 700 people formed in Carbondale, CO (population 6,500) from The Goat parking lot to Highway 133 to the roundabout.
Colorado	Colorado Springs		7,000	Acacia Park – downtown Colorado Springs.
Colorado	Cortez		400–504	Cortez City Park, Montezuma Ave – Colorado Welcome Center on Main St
Colorado	Crested Butte		350–400	Crested Butte 4-Way Stop, Elk Avenue
Colorado	Denver		100,000–200,000	People arrived as early as 8:00 am CMT to protest at the Civic Center and march downtown.
Colorado	Durango		200	Hundreds marched through a foot of snow down Main Avenue.
Colorado	Fort Collins		600	(Jan 22) "Rally for our Rights" was held on Sunday at Northside Aztlan Community Center; organized by Fort Collins for Progress
Colorado	Glenwood Springs		100	Centennial Park – march downtown
Colorado	Grand Junction		1,000	Old R-5 High School Parking Lot (Grand Ave & 7th St in GJ)
Colorado	Lafayette		66–112	
Colorado	Minturn		6	
Colorado	Paonia		40	
Colorado	Ridgway		50	event planned at 304 South Lena Street
Colorado	Salida		40–50	Alpine Park – Riverside Park
Colorado	Silverton		33	
Colorado	Steamboat Springs		1,000	Protesters started marching at Bud Werner Memorial Library and ended at Third Street. A rally was then held at the Routt County Courthouse.
Colorado	Telluride		500 – 1,000	Oak Street Mall (next to San Miguel County Courthouse) – Elks Park. Olympic skier Gus Kenworthy noted that half the residents of the town participated.
Connecticut	East Haddam		100–500	Hundreds rallied outside Two Wrasslin' Cats Coffee House & Café in East Haddam, near New London.
Connecticut	Hartford		10,000	The march had the support of Governor Dannel Malloy.
Connecticut	Kent		180	Town Hall – Civil War Monument
Connecticut	Lakeville		85–100	
Connecticut	Milford		120	(Jan 20) Milford City Hall
Connecticut	New Haven		200	Beinecke Plaza, Yale campus – the Green
Connecticut	Old Saybrook		1,000	Participants marched down Main Street and gathered in front of Town Hall.
Connecticut	Salisbury		500	Salisbury Green at the White Hart Inn
Connecticut	Stamford		5,000	People marched peacefully in Stamford, Connecticut, after a rally in the Mill River Park. The protesters marched around the city blocks surrounding the Trump Parc Stamford building, a building managed by the Trump Organization, a display of resistance to President Donald Trump's policies. The number of demonstrators was reportedly four times larger than organizers expected, according to event Organizer, Lisa Boyne. The rally was originally planned to be held indoors at the UCONN, Stamford campus, but was moved outdoors to the Mill River Park when attendance was expected to exceed 800.
Delaware	Lewes		250+	People walked along Lewes Beach in Cape Henlopen State Park in solidarity.
Delaware	Newark		1,000	People participated in a 2.4-mile march.
Florida	Boca Raton		120	A "Stand up for American Values" rally, organized by the local Democratic club, was held at the corner of Glades Road and St. Andrews Boulevard.
Florida	Daytona Beach		hundreds	A few hundred protesters assembled at a bandstand in town and sang Give Peace a Chance.
Florida	Fernandina Beach		1,000 – 1,367	The Amelia Island Solidarity March began at downtown Fernandina Beach and participants followed the route normally taken during the annual Shrimp Festival, concluding at Central Park. The Fernandina Beach News-Leader wrote that the rally "may have been the largest number of people to participate in a march on Amelia Island since federal troops invaded in March 1862."
Florida	Gainesville		1,500	People rallied along Newberry Road.
Florida	Jacksonville		2,000–3,000	Thousands marched through the streets to the Jacksonville Landing.
Florida	Key West		3,500	Crowds marched down Duval Street to Mallory Square. Marion County Commissioner Heather Carruthers spoke at the event and organizer Jamie Mattingly led the crowds in a rendition of John Lennon's Imagine. Author Judy Blume also participated.
Florida	Melbourne		500	A demonstration was held on the Eau Gallie Causeway
Florida	Miami Beach			event planned on the Norwegian Pearl Jam Cruise
Florida	Miami		10,000+	The demonstration at Bayfront Park in Miami, Florida reached capacity of more than 10,000 and demonstrators began flooding the streets. More than 100 speakers representing local organizations participated in the event. Many of them were documented by photographer Ekaterina Juskowski for the Miami Girls Foundation as part of its Women's March campaign, which aimed to amplify diverse voices and grassroots activism.
Florida	Naples		2,500	Protesters gathered at Cambier Park and then marched through the streets.
Florida	New Smyrna Beach		1,000	Protesters marched across the North Causeway.
Florida	Ocala		300	rally at the downtown square
Florida	Orlando		6,000+	The demonstration was held at Lake Eola Park, in Downtown.
Florida	Panama City		500	A rally was held at McKenzie Park, followed by a protest march down Harrison Avenue.
Florida	Pensacola		2,000	A demonstration was held at the Plaza de Luna.
Florida	Sarasota		10,000+	Thousands marched over the Ringling Causeway Bridge. Author Stephen King participated in the march.
Florida	St. Augustine		2,000+	Marchers walked across Bridge of Lions and a rally was held in the Plaza de la Constitucion.
Florida	St. Petersburg		20,000+	Over 20,000 people marched in downtown St. Petersburg (Demen's Landing Park – Bayshore Drive and Beach Drive), making it the largest demonstration in the city's history. Mayor Rick Kriseman declared Saturday as Women's Rights Day in St. Petersburg.
Florida	Tallahassee		14,000+	Over 14,000 people of the capital's communities showed up to protest. Despite forecasts for heavy rain, the crowd poured into the Railroad Square Arts location before marching up the road to the Florida A&M University Recreation center. Most of the protesters turned out for the march, and due to the small indoor venue, less than a tenth of those attending were able to view the speakers rally. This may be the largest protest in Florida's capitol history.
Florida	West Palm Beach		5,000–7,000	Meyer Amphitheatre
(Georgia (U.S. state)) Georgia	Athens		700 – 4,500	A rally was held at the Classic Center venue near the Athena statue.
(Georgia (U.S. state)) Georgia	Atlanta		60,000	The march began at the Center for Civil and Human Rights and stretched more than a mile, ending at the Georgia State Capitol. US Rep. John Lewis and House Minority Leader Stacey Abrams (D-Atlanta) attended the Atlanta march and rally.
(Georgia (U.S. state)) Georgia	Augusta		600	Despite tornado warnings and severe thunderstorms, "Augusta Solidairty" attracted 600 marchers to downtown Augusta.
(Georgia (U.S. state)) Georgia	Savannah		1,000+	Hundreds of protesters converged upon Johnson and Wright Squares.
(Georgia (U.S. state)) Georgia	Statesboro		200	A march on at Georgia Southern University drew around 200 participants, who marched from Sweetheart Circle to the Rotunda, where they then held a rally.
(Georgia (U.S. state)) Georgia	Zebulon		35	People braved a storm while rallying outside Magistrate Court of Pike County.
Guam	Hagåtña		100+	Participants marched in the Fanohge Famalao'an: Guåhan March in solidarity.
Hawaii	Hana		100+	Hana Bay
Hawaii	Hilo		1,500–2,000	Hilo Women's March and Gathering at the Moʻoheau Bandstand and around downtown
Hawaii	Honolulu (Oahu)		3,000 – 8,000	Thousands of people marched around the Hawaiian State Capitol.
Hawaii	Kahului (Maui)	People stand and sit on a green lawn before a sunny sky.	1,500 – 5,000	The march was assembled at University of Hawaiʻi Maui College.
Hawaii	Kaunakakai (Molokai)		75–100	Molokaʻi Public Library, 15 Ala Malama St – baseball park
Hawaii	Kawaihae		50	Na Wahine for Women's Rights took their march to the water with a group paddle at Kawaihae Small Boat Harbor on the Big Island.
Hawaii	Kona		3,000 – 3,500	Queen Ka'ahumanu Highway, south of Henry Street – The Edible World Institute, off Kopiko Street
Hawaii	Lihue (Kauai)		1,645+	On Saturday morning, 145 people marched from the Kauai War Memorial Convention Hall to the Historic County Building. Later that day, over 1,500 people lined both sides of Ahukini Road for a sign-waving event.
Idaho	Boise		5,000	Heavy snow began to fall in Boise as marchers gathered at 10 a.m. on the Idaho State Capitol steps, and that later turned to rain.
Idaho	Driggs		1,000+	Teton County Courthouse – Driggs City Plaza
Idaho	Idaho Falls		500	Snake River Landing – Capitol, Broadway, Memorial – Unitarian Universalist Church.
Idaho	Ketchum		1,150+	Ketchum Town Square – Main Street / nexStage Theatre
Idaho	Moscow		2,500+	Titled "Women's March on the Palouse", the event was centered in Moscow, ID near Washington State University and University of Idaho. The march started at Moscow City Hall and ended at East City Park.
Idaho	Pocatello		1,000–1,200	Caldwell Park – Pond Student Union Building, Idaho State University campus
Idaho	Sandpoint		800–1,000	Panida Theater – Statue of Liberty at City Beach
Idaho	Stanley		30	Half the town of Stanley, Idaho (population 63) turned out for the rally, including resident singer Carole King.
Illinois	Carbondale		800 – 1,000	Carbondale Civic Center
Illinois	Champaign-Urbana		5,000	5,000 people gathered at West Side Park in downtown Champaign.
Illinois	Chicago		250,000	Organizers for the sister march in Chicago, Illinois, initially prepared for a crowd of 22,000. An estimated 250,000 protesters gathered in Grant Park for an initial rally to be followed by a march, with attendance far more than expected. As a result, the official march was cancelled, although marchers then flooded the streets of the Chicago Loop. Liz Radford, an organizer, informed the crowd, "We called, and you came. We have flooded the march route. We have flooded Chicago."
Illinois	Elgin		200–1,000	Event held at Hemmens Cultural Center (capacity 1,200).
Illinois	Galesburg		100–500	A march through downtown Galesburg began with a rally at Knox County Courthouse.
Illinois	Maryville		40–50	Event was planned at the playground.
Illinois	Peoria		1,500 – 2,000	The rally was held from 10 a.m. to noon at the Gateway Building, with an estimated 2,000 people on the Peoria river front. Among the speakers was state representative Jehan Gordon-Booth. A follow-up Facebook group was formed to maintain organization for future rallies.
Illinois	Rockford		1,000+	Lucette Salon & Spa – Emmanuel Episcopal Church. About two dozen pro-life counterprotesters were also present.
Illinois	Springfield		1,000+	US Sen. Dick Durbin spoke to the rally at the Old State Capitol.
Indiana	Angola		few dozen	rally near Angola round-about (Steuben County Soldiers Monument)
Indiana	Evansville		200+	(Friday, Jan 20) Hundreds gathered at the Four Freedoms Monument along the downtown waterfront.
Indiana	Fort Wayne		1,000	An estimated 1,000 people rallied in the Allen County Courthouse Square Saturday afternoon to support women's rights, celebrate diversity and send a message to the White House.
Indiana	Indianapolis		4,500–5,000	The protest at the Indiana State Capitol was the city's largest rally in recent memory.
Indiana	Lafayette		800	Tippecanoe County Courthouse
Indiana	Paoli		67	Orange County Courthouse
Indiana	South Bend		1,000+	Morris Performing Arts Center / Jon Hunt Plaza. South Bend Mayor Pete Buttigieg made an appearance.
Indiana	St. Mary of the Woods		200+	More than 200 people from Terre Haute and beyond attended the one-hour event outside the Church of the Immaculate Conception.
Indiana	Terre Haute		200	Around 200 people protested, first at Saint Mary-of-the-Woods College, then at the Vigo County Courthouse, and then by a march through downtown Terre Haute.
Indiana	Valparaiso		260–500	Porter County Courthouse
Iowa	Bettendorf		350	Several hundred people from around the Quad Cities region participated. The crowd overflowed onto the lawn of the United Steelworkers local where the rally was held.
Iowa	Decorah		800–1,000	Protesters marched to the Winneshiek County Courthouse.
Iowa	Des Moines		26,000	The march near the Iowa State Capitol included women, men and children supporting women's rights and healthcare, environmental issues, and immigration.
Iowa	Dubuque		400+	Town Clock Plaza
Iowa	Fairfield		200	Fairfield Arts & Convention Center
Iowa	Harpers Ferry		5	The smallest Iowa 2017 sister march occurred in the northeastern town of Harpers Ferry (population less than 300).
Iowa	Iowa City		1,000	Over a thousand people marched a half-mile to the Old Capitol Building, where State Rep. Mary Mascher (D-Iowa City) addressed the crowd.
Kansas	Topeka		4,200	State Capitol Building
Kansas	Wichita		3,000	Protesters marched to City Hall.
Kentucky	Lexington		5,000	Fayette County Courthouse
Kentucky	Louisville		5,000	People showed up at Louisville's Metro Hall for The Rally To Move Forward in Louisville, Kentucky. Congressman John Yarmuth from Louisville was scheduled to speak.
Kentucky	Murray		700+	Murray State University campus – downtown
Kentucky	Owensboro		15–30	
Kentucky	Pikeville		100	Pikeville City Park
Louisiana	Monroe		30+	Monroe City Hall – "Celebration of Healing" sculpture in downtown Monroe
Louisiana	New Orleans		10,000–15,000	At one point, the procession spanned the entire march route, from Washington Square Park all the way to Duncan Plaza, next to City Hall. The 10,000+ protesters were joined by members of Our Revolution NOLA, NOW Baton Rouge and the Millennial's March. Actor Seth Rogen tweeted video from New Orleans.
Louisiana	Shreveport		few hundred	Hundreds of people marched around the Caddo Parish Courthouse in Shreveport to demonstrate their solidarity with the Women's March on Washington.
Maine	Augusta		10,000+	There were 5,000 people registered to attend the rally in Augusta. In fact, 10,000 people attended, making this the largest Women's March in the state. The crowd assembled for speeches at the State House.
Maine	Brunswick		300	Town Mall
Maine	Eastport		111	Over 100 people from 13 communities walked in the march in Eastport, which started in front of the schools at 10 a.m. and ended at the Fish Pier parking lot.
Maine	Ellsworth		60	
Maine	Gouldsboro		25–45	Dorcas Library, Prospect Harbor
Maine	Fort Kent		50	Event took place at Christ Congregational Church on Pleasant Street.
Maine	Kennebunk		400–700	People lined both sides of Main St & Rte 1 from the Waterhouse Pavilion to Shopper's Village.
Maine	Lubec		hundreds	Flatiron Corner
Maine	Monhegan Island		22	22 people were counted on an island with a population of 34
Maine	Portland		10,000+	Women's Walk Portland, one of the largest protest marches ever held in the city, stretched more than a mile along Congress Street from Munjoy Hill to Congress Square Park, and drew far more people than expected. Portland police said the size of the orderly protest crowd was "of historic proportions"; marchers were five to six people abreast. Only a few hundred could fit into Congress Square Park's rally while the rest milled around the surrounding blocks.
Maine	Sanford		100	March took place in Central Park.
Maine	Surry			
Maine	Tenants Harbor		50–60	The Tenants Harbor march Jan. 21 ran from the St. George Town Office to the post office and back.
Maine	Vinalhaven		76 – 100	
Maryland	Accident		54	A bus of people traveling from St. Louis, Missouri to Washington, D.C. broke down in Accident, Maryland and the group became stranded for nine hours waiting for a replacement bus. The group marched around the parking lot of the gas station/diner/convenience store where they were stranded. When the replacement bus arrived, it was too late to make it to Washington so they turned around and drove the 10 hours back to St. Louis.
Maryland	Annapolis		1,600	People marched along Main Street to the Maryland State House in Maryland's capital city.
Maryland	Baltimore		5,000	A sister women's march took place outside of Johns Hopkins University in North Baltimore. Notable figures included former Maryland Senator Paul Sarbanes and State's Attorney for Baltimore Marilyn Mosby. Additional marchers en route to Washington, D.C., were lined up around the block at Pennsylvania Station waiting for MARC express trains to Union Station.
Maryland	Frederick		1,000	Protestors began marching at Market and Patrick Streets to Carroll Creek Park in Downtown Frederick.
Maryland	Ocean City		200	Hundreds of protesters marched along the boardwalk to the Division Street Plaza.
Maryland	St. Mary's City		10	
Massachusetts	Boston		150,000 – 175,000	Hundreds of thousands of people gathered at the Boston Common; Boston Mayor Marty Walsh, Attorney General Maura Healey and US Senators Elizabeth Warren and Ed Markey spoke to the crowd. Protesters then marched around the Public Garden and halfway down the Commonwealth Avenue Mall.
Massachusetts	Bridgewater		dozen+	
Massachusetts	Falmouth		1,500	Falmouth Village Green. US Rep William Keating spoke to the crowd.
Massachusetts	Greenfield		2,000+	Approximately two thousand people peacefully gathered on the Greenfield Town Common to hold the Women Standing Our Ground Rally in solidarity with the Women's March on Washington.
Massachusetts	Harwich		200	intersection of Route 124 and 39
Massachusetts	Martha's Vineyard		160	Five Corners
Massachusetts	Nantucket		400	Atheneum Park
Massachusetts	Northampton		1,000+	Over a thousand people marched through downtown Northampton, ending with a peaceful demonstration at Pulaski Park where various local activists gave speeches.
Massachusetts	Pittsfield		1,640	More than double the number of people that organizer's expected came to the Colonial Theatre in Pittsfield to protest and watch the coverage of the Washington, D.C., march. The event concluded with a staged reading of monologues responding to the election and cultural climate.
Massachusetts	Provincetown		300+	Hundreds marched at the tip of Cape Cod to the MacMillan Pier in Provincetown Harbor.
Massachusetts	Southborough		50	St. Anne Church
Massachusetts	Springfield		40+	Mason Square
Massachusetts	Wellfleet		113	Event held at Wellfleet Town Hall
Massachusetts	Worcester		~7	Billed as a coalition of local groups opposing President Trump's 'fascist policies', Worcester's sparsely attended rally coincided with others in the nation's capital, New York City and Boston. Organizer Gordon T. Davis said the low turnout in Worcester had to do with area residents attending rallies in the larger cities.
Michigan	Adrian		150	old county courthouse
Michigan	Ann Arbor		11,000 – 20,000	Protesters rallied downtown and marched to the Univ. of Michigan campus where they attended a rally, the largest in Michigan. Speakers included Rep. Debbie Dingell, UAW Vice President Cindy Estrada, Vice Chair County Commission and March Organizer Michelle Deatrick.
Michigan	Beaver Island		18 – 22	
Michigan	Brighton		300	Brighton Mill Pond
Michigan	Clare		dozens	gazebo in the center of Clare City Park
Michigan	Copper Harbor		19–25	tip of the Keweenaw Peninsula in Upper Michigan (winter population: 100)
Michigan	Detroit		4,000	People protested at the campus of Wayne State University in Midtown Detroit.
Michigan	Douglas-Saugatuck		1,200–2,500	Beery Field, Douglas – Blue Star Highway Bridge over the Kalamazoo River – Lucy's Little Kitchen, Saugatuck
Michigan	Grand Rapids		3,000	Thousands of people gathered for a rally at the Fountain Street Church before marching through Downtown to the Rosa Parks Circle.
Michigan	Grosse Pointe		few hundred	Maire School, corner of Kercheval and Cadieux Roads – Park (Wayburn St)
Michigan	Harrisville		5	
Michigan	Houghton		500+	People participated in a march across the Portage Lake Lift Bridge between Houghton and Hancock in Michigan's largely conservative Upper Peninsula.
Michigan	Kalamazoo		1,000+	The march proceeded from WMU's campus along West Michigan Avenue to the Kalamazoo Mall downtown.
Michigan	Lansing		8,000 – 10,000	Thousands gathered at the Michigan State Capitol in solidarity of all groups who have been marginalized by the actions of Donald Trump. Recently declared Democratic candidate for governor Gretchen Whitmer spoke at the event.
Michigan	Marquette		800–1,000	courthouse & Post Office, West Washington St Marquette, a city in the Upper Peninsula, saw "almost unprecedented turnout" for the event, according to one local newspaper: 800 people signed into the event, which was held in a city of just over 21,000. Organizers estimated that over a thousand actually turned up but did not sign their name.
Michigan	Midland		400	A bus carrying a third of the Tri-Cities' Washington, D.C.-bound marchers experienced mechanical problems, which increased the attendance at the downtown Midland protest.
Michigan	St. Joseph		60	
Michigan	Sault Ste Marie		40	Sault Ste Marie Courthouse on Queen St
Michigan	Tecumseh		35	
Michigan	Traverse City		3,000	People marched past Votruba Leather Goods' Front Street windows for more than an hour. Officers barricaded Garland St to give the thousands of demonstrators a place to safely gather after the march.
Michigan	Ypsilanti		1,500	Bona Sera Restaurant
Minnesota	Bemidji		250–500	Sanford Center – downtown Bemidji
Minnesota	Cambridge		22	
Minnesota	Duluth		1,400	People marched through the Skywalk System in Downtown Duluth, filling it from one end to the other.
Minnesota	Ely		50	Whiteside Park
Minnesota	Grand Marais		120	A small crowd of 10 gathered at the courthouse at 10 am. As they marched past City Hall, more people fell in line; by the time they reached Harbor Park, the rally had grown to 120 people.
Minnesota	Longville		66	In Longville, MN, a town of about 150 people, retired librarian Michelle Barton prepared for a solo march, her worst-case scenario being "people driving by and taking potshots at me". Instead, more than 60 others joined her.
Minnesota	Mankato		50	Jackson Park
Minnesota	Minneapolis		hundreds	(Friday, Jan. 20) Lake & Nicollet – City Hall (see St. Paul for the larger Twin Cities march on January 21).
Minnesota	Morris		250	A 30-minute march took place around downtown Morris, centralized around the Stevens County Courthouse.
Minnesota	Rochester		600–1,000	A protest was held at Silver Lake.
Minnesota	St. Cloud		40	A rally was held at Lake George on January 20, followed by a protest march down Minnesota Highway 23.
Minnesota	St. Paul	People with flags and signs mill about in front of a statehouse on a butty day.	90,000–100,000	People marched to the Minnesota State Capitol from Cathedral Hill and various other parts of the city. A spokesman for the St. Paul Police stated it was the largest protest in the city since the 2008 Republican National Convention. State Rep. Ilhan Omar (DFL-Minneapolis) participated in the march and rally.
Mississippi	Gulfport		300+	More than 300 people showed up at Cafe Climb.
Mississippi	Hattiesburg		0	The morning march from Hattiesburg City Hall was canceled by a tornado that hit early Saturday.
Mississippi	Jackson		1,000	Mississippi State Capitol – Governor's Mansion.
Mississippi	Oxford		450	On the Courthouse Square, attendees built an "action wall" of follow-up actions.
Missouri	Columbia		2,000 – 3,000	Mid-Missouri Solidarity March; Boone County Courthouse Plaza – downtown
Missouri	Jefferson City			event planned at the Missouri State Capitol
Missouri	Kansas City		10,000	The demonstration was held at Washington Square Park in downtown Kansas City.
Missouri	Springfield		2,000+	People marched to Park Central Square in downtown Springfield. The parade made its way from the parking lot at Springfield's municipal court building, across the Martin Luther King Jr. Bridge and over to Park Central Square where several speakers addressed the crowd. The rally touched on political issues in addition to women's rights. One speaker, Bethany Johnson, a transgender woman, spoke and drew some of the loudest cheers. She also mentioned the 2015 vote that repealed the city's ordinance banning LGBT discrimination in the workplace. Johnson banged the podium and called on the marchers to contact their politicians.
Missouri	St. Louis		13,000	People marched peacefully in downtown St. Louis from Union Station to a rally at Luther Ely Smith Square.
Missouri	Willow Springs		30	A rally was held on the sidewalk by the Star Theatre.
Montana	Bozeman		13	
Montana	Helena		10,000	People marched through the city and around the Montana State Capitol.
Montana	Miles City		500	march planned along Main Street on the sidewalks from Riverside Park to 10th St and back
Montana	Missoula		80–110	
Nebraska	Alliance		~125	
Nebraska	Lincoln		2,000–3,000	Approximately 2,000 to 3,000 people gathered outside the University of Nebraska-Lincoln Student Union. 40 members of the fraternity Phi Gamma Delta held a counter protest by waving Trump flags off their balcony.
Nebraska	Loup City		125+	More than 125 people gathered in the town of Loup City, where the town has a total population of just over 1,000 residents.
Nebraska	Omaha		12,000–14,000	The peaacful march was so large – far exceeding organizers' expectations of 2,000 to 4,000 people – that at times it stretched for 14 blocks, from the CenturyLink Center to the Old Market.
Nevada	Las Vegas		5,000+	People marched from East Fremont Street, south on Las Vegas Boulevard to outside the Lloyd D. George Federal District Courthouse.
Nevada	Reno		10,000	Protesters marched down Virginia Street to the BELIEVE sign at City Plaza.
Nevada	Stateline		500	
New Hampshire	Concord		1,000+	More than a thousand marches attended the New Hampshire Women's Day of Action and Unity rally in front of the New Hampshire State House. U.S. Senator Jeanne Shaheen and others spoke.
New Hampshire	Francestown		140	The peaceful marchers walked up and down Main Street and then gathered around the Francestown Meetinghouse for speeches.
New Hampshire	Jackson		300+	Jackson Grammar School parking lot, adjacent to the Jackson Marketplace
New Hampshire	Keene		300	Central Square
New Hampshire	Lancaster		400	Great North Woods Welcome Center – Main Street. Hundreds of protesters from both New Hampshire and Vermont turned out in Lancaster, NH.
New Hampshire	Peterborough		55	
New Hampshire	Portsmouth		3,000–5,000	Most people rallied at Market Square while others marched down Congress St to Maplewood Ave.
New Hampshire	Wilton		200	Main Street Park
New Jersey	Asbury Park		6,000	Protesters marched to Convention Hall. Singer/songwriter Patti Scialfa attended the march as well as U.S. Representative Frank Pallone.
New Jersey	Leonia		250	Broad Street – Wood Park
New Jersey	Metuchen			
New Jersey	Mt. Laurel		20	
New Jersey	Pequannock Township / Pompton Plains		800 – 1,000	Pequannock Township Hall / 530 Newark-Pompton Turnpike
New Jersey	Red Bank		200	Riverside Gardens Park
New Jersey	Sicklerville		200	Gloucester Township Community Park
New Jersey	South Orange		200	gazebo near the South Orange train station – Spiotta Park
New Jersey	Trenton		6,000 – 7,500	Protesters marched from an overflowing rally in and around the Trenton War Memorial auditorium to another rally outside the State House.
New Jersey	Westfield		2,000	Protesters marched in Westfield to Representative Leonard Lance's office.
New Jersey	Wyckoff		300–500	Franklin Avenue outside Municipal Hall
New Mexico	Albuquerque		10,000	Protesters rallied at the Civic Plaza. US Sen. Tom Udall attended the rally.
New Mexico	Deming		45–50	Leyendecker Plaza Park – Courthouse Park
New Mexico	El Morro		30	Ancient Way Café
New Mexico	Fort Sumner			event planned at Dallas Park
New Mexico	Gila		1	
New Mexico	Las Cruces		1,500	SW Environmental Law Center / Plaza de Las Cruces. More than 20 groups were involved in the march, which brought out 1,500 concerned residents.
New Mexico	Las Vegas		50	
New Mexico	Portales		70	Roosevelt County Courthouse
New Mexico	Roswell		2	
New Mexico	Santa Fe		10,000–15,000	Thousands of Santa Feans and other northern New Mexicans marched and held signs in a rally that surrounded the Roundhouse. Santa Fe Mayor Javier Gonzales was present.
New Mexico	Silver City		500	People's Procession: La Capilla / Spring Street Park – Gough Park
New Mexico	Taos		100	(Jan 20) We Go High: Alternative Inauguration Day Gathering, Taos Plaza
New Mexico	Truth or Consequences		154	event planned at Healing Waters Plaza
New York	Albany		7,000+	At the State Capitol, a crowd of 7,000 exceeded the initial prediction of 2,000.
New York	Binghamton		3,000	The march was held downtown and exceeded initial estimates for the event.
New York	Buffalo		2,500–3,000	A march in Niagara Square drew demonstrators and local politicians.
New York	Canton		135	
New York	Cobleskill		350	Main Street – Centre Park
New York	Cooperstown		200+	Otsego County Courthouse
New York	Delhi		200	
New York	Fredonia		70	Mason Hall, State University of New York at Fredonia
New York	Glens Falls		1,500	Centennial Circle
New York	Hudson		2,000 – 3,000	7th Street Park – Warren Street
New York	Ithaca		10,000	The demonstration began and ended on the Ithaca Commons.
New York	Lewis		several hundred	Adirondack-Champlain Valley Women's March; famed suffragette Inez Milholland was honored at her grave site in Lewis Cemetery behind the Congregational Church.
New York	New York City		400,000	In Manhattan, hundreds of thousands marched. The rally began at Dag Hammarskjöld Plaza (near Trump World Tower and the United Nations) and then proceeded to Trump Tower as well as Trump's home. The Office of the Mayor of New York City announced that the number of attendees was over 400,000.
New York	Oneonta		500+	Muller Plaza
New York	Plattsburgh		700	North Country March for Unity and Respect
New York	Port Jefferson		2,000	intersection of Routes 347 and 112
New York	Port Jervis		350–500	St. Peter's Lutheran Church
New York	Poughkeepsie		5,000	The march took place on the Walkway over the Hudson.
New York	Rochester		1,000–2,000	People's Solidarity Rally at Washington Square Park. The protests were mostly peaceful, but 7 people were arrested for punching a photographer that was covering the event, and for disrupting the peaceful protests.
New York	Sag Harbor		250	Men, women, and children gathered by the windmill on the Long Wharf around noon and then marched up and down Main Street.
New York	Seneca Falls		10,000	The event started at the Women's Rights National Historical Park, the Seneca Falls Convention, an early convention on women's rights in 1848.
New York	Syracuse		2,000+	James Hanley Federal Building
New York	Utica		100+	Over 100 people gathered in front of Mohawk Valley Community College and the Utica State Office Building to join in the march.
New York	Watertown		250+	All Souls Unitarian Universalist Church
New York	Woodstock		1,000	The march ran from the Andy Lee Field parking lot down Rock City Road to Mill Hill Road.
North Carolina	Asheville		7,000–10,000	Asheville's women's march began at Park Square and then moved throughout downtown Asheville. Estimated attendance is between 7,000 and 10,000 people making it the largest assembly in Asheville since 2013.
North Carolina	Beaufort		11	
North Carolina	Black Mountain		600+	The group marched downtown, from the town square to St. James Episcopal Church.
North Carolina	Burnsville		80	
North Carolina	Charlotte		25,000	Lasting from 10 a.m. to noon, attendance was ten times what had been expected, according to event organizers. Some participants came from surrounding communities, including Concord, Rock Hill and Indian Trail. Attendees included Mayor Jennifer Roberts, U.S. Rep. Alma Adams (D-Charlotte) and state Senator Jeff Jackson (D-Mecklenburg). According to the CMPD, the march was peaceful, with no arrests or disturbances reported.
North Carolina	Greensboro		3,000–6,000	Triad NC Women's March took place at Government Plaza
North Carolina	Greenville		200	Pitt County Courthouse
North Carolina	Hillsborough		200	Orange County Courthouse
North Carolina	Mooresville		70	Brawley School and Stutts roads – Trump National Golf Club Charlotte
North Carolina	Morganton		500	People marched down Union Street to the Burke County Courthouse.
North Carolina	New Bern		600	Union Point Park – parking lot across from the First Presbyterian Church
North Carolina	Ocracoke		120	School Road – Lighthouse Road
North Carolina	Raleigh		17,000	Thousands of people demonstrated peacefully at the Raleigh Women's March, starting at City Plaza and heading down Fayetteville and Martin Streets towards Moore Square. U.S. Representative David Price also attended.
North Carolina	Saxapahaw		80	
North Carolina	West Jefferson		250 – 300	Hundreds gathered at Back Street Park and marched through downtown West Jefferson.
North Carolina	Wilmington		1,000–1,500	Intersection of Third and Princess Streets / City Hall
North Carolina	Winston-Salem		100+	rally planned at the Parkway United Church of Christ
North Dakota	Bismarck		500	North Dakota State Capitol grounds
North Dakota	Fargo		< 3,000	Broadway – NP Avenue
North Dakota	Grand Forks		304	Archives Coffee House, UND campus
Ohio	Athens		150–200	(Jan 20) A rally took place outside Athens County Courthouse prior to a late afternoon march along the streets of uptown Athens; students from Ohio University took part in the event.
Ohio	Chillicothe		1,000	Protesters gathered at the Ross County Courthouse and then marched to Yoctangee Park.
Ohio	Cincinnati		7,000+	The Women's March started at noon at Washington Park, and after representatives from several civic groups spoke, the march started towards City Hall, and back to Washington Park.
Ohio	Cleveland		15,000	Protesters gathered at Public Square and then marched through downtown.
Ohio	Columbus		3,000	Protesters gathered at the Ohio State House.
Ohio	Dayton		3,000	rally at the Courthouse Square
Ohio	Kent		100	Hosted by Kent Interfaith Alliance.
Ohio	Lakeside		300	Lakeside Chautauqua
Ohio	Mount Vernon		20–30	
Ohio	Springfield		5	(Jan 20) About five people marched downtown for two hours on Friday afternoon.
Ohio	Toledo		450	(Friday, Jan. 20) Several hundred protesters marched across the Martin Luther King Bridge, and arrived at Trinity Episcopal Church for a community celebration.
Ohio	Troy		150	County Courthouse Plaza
Ohio	Wilmington		70+	Clinton County Courthouse
Ohio	Wooster		500 – 1,000	A rally was held at the gazebo in Wooster Public Square Historic District.
Ohio	Yellow Springs		250	At least 250 villagers took to the sidewalks in downtown Yellow Springs.
Oklahoma	Oklahoma City		12,000+	Demonstrations were held in front of the Oklahoma State Capitol.
Oklahoma	Tulsa		1,000	A rally was held at the John Hope Franklin Reconciliation Park.
Oregon	Ashland		8,000	Ashland police estimated 8,000 participants in the Ashland Women's March at Lithia Park.
Oregon	Astoria		1,400–1,600	Hundreds of people met at the public parking lot at 12th & Exchange Streets, then marched along the sidewalks of downtown Astoria (in the rain), with a number of drivers honking their support from the streets.
Oregon	Bandon		65	Women's Peace March held Friday, January 20, at Bandon City Hall.
Oregon	Bend		5,000	A rally was held at Drake Park followed by a rally through Downtown.
Oregon	Brookings		275	Curry County Democratic Headquarters – Fifth Avenue
Oregon	Burns		20	Women's March Harney County; intersection of W. Adams & Egan
Oregon	Coos Bay		200	corner of Anderson Avenue and Bayshore Drive
Oregon	Corvallis		hundreds	Student Experience Center plaza and Central Park – riverfront and Odd Fellows Hall
Oregon	Eugene		7,000+	US Federal District Court – 8th Ave through downtown Eugene – WOW Hall.
Oregon	Florence		250–350	Class Act Theater
Oregon	Grants Pass		300–350	(Sun, Feb 19) Since Grants Pass might have been the largest city in Oregon not to have a women's march in January 2017, organizers of Rogue Indivisible decided to correct that omission by holding a rally at the Boys & Girls Club, a month into the Trump administration. The rally turnout at times "rivaled a church revival".
Oregon	Halfway		31	Main St & E. Record St.
Oregon	Hood River		200	Hood River Library
Oregon	Joseph		300	March planned at the Joseph city parking lot and down North Lake Street.
Oregon	Klamath Falls		200 – 300	Marchers began at Klamath County library parking lot, and headed down Klamath Ave to Fifth St and over South Sixth St Bridge before finally arriving at Klamath County Government Building. Numerous motorists along the way honked their support, while others sped past cursing; one particular pickup truck driver repeatedly spewed black diesel fumes over the marchers, a practice known as "rolling coal".
Oregon	La Grande		400	Fourth Street and Max Square
Oregon	McMinnville		700	Women of Yamhill County March; McMinnville Ballroom
Oregon	Newport		1,500	Newport City Hall
Oregon	Pendleton		425	March planned at the City Hall and Heritage Station Museum.
Oregon	Port Orford		200–300	Battle Rock Park – public library parking lot
Oregon	Portland		100,000	The first Women's March on Portland began with a rally near the Morrison Bridge at Tom McCall Waterfront Park. Originally estimated to attract between 20,000 and 30,000 people, the actual turnout became one of the largest public protests in Oregon history, with 100,000 people standing shoulder to shoulder (in the rain). They marched along Southwest Naito Parkway, looping around a 44-block area of downtown Portland, and finished at the Battleship Oregon Memorial.
Oregon	Salem		2,000	Salem Capitol Mall. Governor Kate Brown participated in the march.
Oregon	Sandy		200	Salmon statue at the Sandy Transit Center, east end – west end intersection of Proctor and Pioneer Blvds
Oregon	The Dalles		100	
Oregon	Tillamook		300	Sue Elmore Park – Highway 101.
Oregon	Welches			Our Retreat, 1000 Nature Ave
Pennsylvania	Annville		30	intersection of Routes 422 & 934 – Annville Public Library
Pennsylvania	Beaver		300	Beaver County Courthouse
Pennsylvania	Bethlehem		500	Payrow Plaza
Pennsylvania	Bloomsburg		40–60	Dozens gathered downtown at the Bloomsburg Fountain on W Main St; one counter-protester stood on the other side of the street.
Pennsylvania	Clarion		100	Fulmer House on the corner of Wood St and Seventh Ave – gazebo in the park
Pennsylvania	Doylestown		2,000	Organizers began planning 6 days before originally anticipating 300 or less attendees.
Pennsylvania	East Liberty		1,800	At least several hundred gathered in East Liberty
Pennsylvania	Erie		2,500	Erie County Courthouse – West Perry Square
Pennsylvania	Harrisburg		1,100	Protesters marched from Kunkle Plaza to the Pennsylvania State Capitol.
Pennsylvania	Hollidaysburg		35	Blair County Courthouse – AFSCME building in Duncansville
Pennsylvania	Indiana		100–200	
Pennsylvania	Lancaster		hundreds	Crowd gathered in Penn Square.
Pennsylvania	Lewisburg		300	About 300 community members gathered at Hufnagle Park.
Pennsylvania	Millheim		50	.
Pennsylvania	Philadelphia		50,000	The event included an actual march from Logan Square to Eakins Oval, and a rally at Eakins Oval.
Pennsylvania	Pittsburgh		25,000	The Women's March on Pittsburgh originally applied for a permit for 400 people. Mayor Bill Peduto estimated more than 25,000 actually turned out, marching through the city to Market Square.
Pennsylvania	Reading		hundreds	Demonstration in City Park
Pennsylvania	Riegelsville		170	Riegelsville Lock in Delaware Canal State Park – Mueller's General Store and Kitchen
Pennsylvania	Selinsgrove		120	Demonstration at the Selinsgrove Post Office for the Central Susquehanna Valley Region.
Pennsylvania	Sharon		700	People marched from the site of the former Columbia Theatre to the Shenango Valley Community Library
Pennsylvania	State College		300–500	"The rally (at the Allen Street gates) attracted a couple hundred people."
Pennsylvania	West Chester		150 – 200	Chester County Courthouse. Former West Chester Mayor Carolyn Comitta, recently sworn in as a State Representative, attended the rally.
Puerto Rico	Mayaguez		24	
Puerto Rico	San Juan		600	Sagrado Corazón Station
Puerto Rico	Santurce		70	
Puerto Rico	Vieques		200 – 350	Esperanza Ruta; Malecon – Sun Bay Pavilion
Rhode Island	Block Island		80	Some 80 Block Island residents circled statue of Rebecca in solidarity with the Women's March movement.
Rhode Island	Providence		5,000	The R.I. Women's Solidarity Rally was held on the Rhode Island State House lawn. Governor Gina Raimondo participated. Young people from Classical High School spoke to the crowd.
South Carolina	Beaufort		50+	An impromptu meeting dubbed "Cookies and Concerns" occurred at a pavilion in the Henry C. Chambers Waterfront Park where participants had unstructured discussions on current events and issues and were asked to bring cookies to donate to local charities.
South Carolina	Charleston		2,000+	The Charleston Women's March began as a convey from nine parking garages downtown and converged at Brittlebank Park at noon.
South Carolina	Clemson		500	The marchers followed a route from the Littlejohn Community Center down State 93 to the Strom Thurmond theater on the Clemson University campus.
South Carolina	Columbia		several thousand	"Stand Up" rally for women's rights and social issues; thousands gathered at the South Carolina State House grounds and marched to the Music Farm.
South Carolina	Greenville		2,000	A peaceful rally was held at the Falls Park amphitheater in Greenville from noon until 2 pm. Attendance was estimated at 2,000.
South Dakota	Pierre		130	Rally in state capital.
South Dakota	Rapid City		1,000	The march started in the morning in the City/School Administration Center parking lot and proceeded through downtown to the Alex Johnson Hotel and through Memorial Park.
South Dakota	Sioux Falls		3,300	Calvary Episcopal Cathedral – City Hall
South Dakota	Vermillion		500+	Participants marched along Main Street to the Courthouse.
Tennessee	Chattanooga		3,000	Thousands gathered at Coolidge Park, then marched down Frazier Avenue, across the Market Street Bridge and toward the Tennessee Aquarium.
Tennessee	Jonesborough		1,000	The Tri-Cities' rally was held at the Washington County Courthouse.
Tennessee	Knoxville		2,000	An assembly was held in Market Square.
Tennessee	Memphis		9,000+	Marchers gathered at the Judge D'Army Bailey Courthouse and marched 1.2 miles to the National Civil Rights Museum.
Tennessee	Murfreesboro			event planned at MTSU Student Union Building in the Courtyard Commons (on Thursday, January 19)
Tennessee	Nashville		15,000+	Participants marched about one mile (1.6 km) through downtown Nashville. The march started at Cumberland Park near Nissan Stadium, crossed the Cumberland River on the John Seigenthaler Pedestrian Bridge, and ended at Public Square.
Tennessee	Oak Ridge		500	Protest organizers expected about 70 people, but roughly 500 people showed up at the Oak Ridge Unitarian Universalist Church.
Texas	Abilene		200	Protesters rallied outside of the Abilene City Hall.
Texas	Alpine		96	Almost 100 people hiked 1.5 miles up Hancock Hill in the cold, wind and rain.
Texas	Amarillo		500 – 700	Protesters marched from Ellwood Park to the Potter County Courthouse and back.
Texas	Austin	Hundreds of people in light clothes, many holding homemade signs, stand in front of several trees and a light stone building.	40,000 – 50,000	The crowd gathered at the Texas State Capitol and marched through the streets of downtown Austin for the Women's March on Austin. The Austin Police Department estimated that the crowd had between 40,000 and 50,000 people, becoming the largest march in Texas history. It was initially expected to draw 30,000 protesters or more. The march was endorsed by former Texas State Senator and 2014 Texas gubernatorial candidate Wendy Davis, Texas Representative Senfronia Thompson, and author Lizzie Velasquez, who gave speeches at the State Capital. Austin Mayor Steve Adler and U.S. Representative Lloyd Doggett were also in attendance. Organizations such as Women Rising and Taylor Collective Solutions, Planned Parenthood of Greater Texas, Texas Freedom Network, Progress Texas and Annie's List also endorsed the march.
Texas	Beaumont		200+	Protesters from the Golden Triangle marched for an hour along Calder Street, starting and ending outside Betty Smith Creative Works.
Texas	Brownsville		300+	Linear Park, near the federal courthouse
Texas	College Station		50	Dozens marched through the campus of Texas A&M University.
Texas	Corpus Christi		100	A peaceful candlelight protest was held outside the Corpus Christi Federal Courthouse.
Texas	Dallas		3,000 – 10,000	Thousands gathered at City Hall and marched through downtown, Deep Ellum and East Dallas to the Communication Workers of America building. Police estimated 3,000 people, and organizers estimated between 7,000 and 10,000.
Texas	Denton		2,500	A United Denton organized the Women's March to be held around Denton County Courthouse-on-the-Square Museum. The downtown square was packed by 12:30 p.m.
Texas	Eagle Pass		60+	San Juan Plaza – Eagle Pass Public Library
Texas	El Paso	Women's March in El Paso wrap up	1,000+	The march ran from Armijo Park in El Segundo Barrio to San Jacinto Plaza in Downtown. El Paso County Judge Veronica Escobar addressed the crowd.
Texas	Fort Worth	Hundreds of people stand before and on the front steps of a brown stone building. The sky is blue with light clouds.	5,000 – 9,000	The march began at the Tarrant County Courthouse and moved down Main and back up Houston Street. This was a Unity march that organizers say gives voice to people from "every cross-section of culture".
Texas	Houston		22,000	Starting at the Sabine Street Bridge, protesters marched through downtown to Houston City Hall. Houston Mayor Sylvester Turner and Houston Police Chief Art Acevedo spoke out during the event.
Texas	Lubbock		350	Protesters gathered on the southwest corner of 19th Street and University, at the Timothy Cole statue.
Texas	Marfa		76	Highland Ave.
Texas	Midland		50 – 100	The march was held near Midland Park Mall.
Texas	Nacogdoches		200–300	Nacogdoches County Courthouse
Texas	San Antonio		1,500	Protesters gathered at San Antonio's City Hall.
Texas	Wichita Falls		150 – 200	Protesters marched two miles along Midwestern Parkway, from Sikes Lake to Kemp Boulevard.
Utah	Bluff		48	event planned at Bluff City Park
Utah	Kanab		nearly 200	People met at the parking lot of Kanab City Hall and marched downtown through snow and cold temperatures.
Utah	Logan		50	Cache County Courthouse
Utah	Moab		250–300	People biked and marched down 100 West.
Utah	Ogden		300	Union Station – Ogden City Municipal Building, Washington Boulevard
Utah	Park City		8,000	Celebrities protested at the Sundance Film Festival against Trump and for women's rights. One of the messages was "Love Trumps Hate". Celebrities in attendance included Charlize Theron, Kristen Stewart, John Legend, Kevin Bacon, Chelsea Handler, and Benjamin Bratt. It was supported by Justice Party, Planned Parenthood Association of Utah, Equality Now, Sentry Financial, and other organizations.
Utah	Saint George		1,400	Southern Utah is largely conservative and anything more than a token protest of a few hundred was not expected, but over 1,000 protesters showed up.
Utah	Salt Lake City		7,000–11,000	The Utah State Capitol Building was the destination of two women's marches following President Trump's inauguration. On Friday, Jan 20, hours after he was sworn in, about 1,000 people gathered in front of the Wallace F. Bennett Federal Building and headed to the Capitol Complex by way of South Temple. Three days later, on Monday afternoon, Jan 23 (the first day of the 2017 state legislative session), more than 10,000 gathered at City Creek Park and marched up State Street in snow and ice; police estimated at least 6,000 made their way into the building (exceeding its fire code capacity of 5,000).
Utah	Sandy		175	
Vermont	Bennington		100	
Vermont	Brattleboro		250+	A noontime vigil was held at Pliny Park.
Vermont	Craftsbury		15	
Vermont	Killington		51–112	event planned: a ski-march down the slopes of Killington
Vermont	Manchester		50	Main Street-Depot Street roundabout
Vermont	Montpelier		20,000	Montpelier High School – Vermont State House; US Senator Bernie Sanders attended the event.
Vermont	St. Johnsbury		60	
(United States Virgin Islands) Virgin Islands	St. Croix		500+	Sunday Market Square – down King Street to the bandstand at the Christiansted National Park lawn near the old slave market.
(United States Virgin Islands) Virgin Islands	St. John		200	Freedom Statue, Cruz Bay
(United States Virgin Islands) Virgin Islands	St. Thomas		300	Yacht Haven Grande – Frenchtown post office
Virginia	Alexandria		17	
Virginia	Arlington		200	
Virginia	Charlottesville		2,000	"Thousands" rallied at the Ix Art Park.
Virginia	Floyd		200	Dogtown Roadhouse – Floyd Courthouse
Virginia	Norfolk		2,800	Two groups – one in front of the Chrysler Museum of Art (2,000 people), the other on Granby Street (800 people) – marched separately with similar messages. Both groups eventually joined up to complete the march together.
Virginia	Onley		50–70	Rte 13, in front of Four Corner Plaza
Virginia	Richmond		2,000+	A sea of people gathered at the foot of the monument to Confederate Gen. Robert E. Lee, for the March on Monument Avenue to the Boulevard. State Sen. Jennifer McClellan addressed the crowd at the end of the march.
Virginia	Roanoke		4,000	Elmwood Park; the crowd size was initially reported to be between 2,500 and 3,000, but later estimated to have reached the park's maximum capacity of 4,000.
Virginia	Staunton		100	Augusta County Circuit Courthouse
Virginia	Williamsburg		700–1,000	Hundreds of residents from the greater Williamsburg area (far exceeding organizers' expectation of 50) took to marching on Duke of Gloucester Street.
Virginia	Winchester		700–1,300	corner of Piccadilly and Braddock streets – Loudoun Street Mall
Virginia	Woodstock		400	old courthouse in Woodstock
Washington	Anacortes		1,200	Hundreds of men and women took to the sidewalks of downtown Anacortes for a Women's March focused on equality and unity as night fell on Friday's Inauguration Day.
Washington	Bainbridge Island		200-350	Eagle Harbor Congregational Church – Winslow Way
Washington	Bellingham		5,000–10,000	City Hall – downtown streets (Commercial, Chestnut & Cornwall)
Washington	Cathlamet		2	
Washington	Chelan		450	Chelan Riverwalk Park – Woodin Ave Bridge and Dan Gordon Bridge
Washington	Eastsound		250	Waterfront Park – Main Street to North Beach Road – Village Green stage
Washington	Ellensburg		200	US Post Office & Ellensburg Public Library
Washington	Ephrata		250	Ephrata train station – Basin Street – Grant County Courthouse. The turnout was three times larger than expected.
Washington	Forks		35	
Washington	Friday Harbor		1,500	200 of the marchers were from the neighboring Shaw, Lopez and Orcas Islands.
Washington	Issaquah		56	
Washington	Kingston		60	Near the town of Bremerton, dozens rallied alongside Washington State Route 104.
Washington	Langley		1,200–1,300	On Whidbey Island, over a thousand people gathered for a march starting at Langley Middle School's parking lot; stretching beyond the length of Sixth St, it was the largest political demonstration in the city's history, even exceeding its population of 1,135. Meanwhile, over 200 residents took the Clinton ferry and four buses to the march in downtown Seattle.
Washington	Longview		200	Civic Circle
Washington	Mount Vernon		several hundred	First Street in downtown, from Skagit Valley Co Op and Tri Dees to Lincoln Theatre/ Kinkaid St., was packed Saturday afternoon as several hundred men, women and children peacefully marched in support of women's rights.
Washington	Ocean Shores		150	In Grays Harbor County, The North Beach Women's March started at Galway Bay Irish Pub on Point Brown Avenue, with a rally that included Mayor Crystal Dingler, and ended at North Beach Community TV station at 823 Anchor Ave.
Washington	Olympia		10,000	front lawn of the Capitol campus
Washington	Port Angeles		200+	Gathering for Hope: Veterans Memorial Park – Elwha Klallam Heritage Center
Washington	Port Townsend		300	Pope Marine Park – Haller Fountain. Port Townsend, with a population of just under 10,000, was flooded with roughly 300 protesters Saturday morning for the Womxn's March – an event that organizers thought would draw 40 to 50 people. U.S. Rep. Derek Kilmer spoke at the end of the march.
Washington	Richland		1,000+	John Dam Plaza – George Washington Way & Jadwin Avenue. Organizers had originally expected 200 participants.
Washington	Seattle	Marchers, most wearing jackets, walk along a street in front of a brick building, carrying signs.	175,000	The Womxn's March on Seattle march took place from Judkins Park to the Space Needle in Seattle, Washington. Participants filled the entire length of the 3.6-mile (5.8 km) route. Sound Transit and King County Metro rerouted many bus routes and added additional Link light rail service in anticipation of disruption to the city's transportation grid.
Washington	Sequim		450+	At daylight, a large crowd (350–500 people) marched with signs in Sequim. Later that evening, over 100 people held a candlelight ceremony at the southeast corner of Sequim Avenue and Washington Street at 1st Security Bank Park.
Washington	Spokane		8,000	Spokane/North Idaho Women's March began with an indoor rally at Spokane Convention Center; its capacity of 6,200 meant thousands more left standing outside (organizers had initially expected between 150 and 200 people). Actor & Spokane native Julia Sweeney addressed the indoor crowd. The subsequent march commenced along Spokane Falls Boulevard, and around the Davenport Grand Hotel.
Washington	Twisp		800	800 people marched through the town of Twisp, WA (population 950)
Washington	Union		40+	310 E Dalby Rd, The Square
Washington	Vancouver		150	Vancouver waterfront
Washington	Vashon		253	A last-minute planned march to the Village Green on Vashon Island attracted as many as "253 people and 22 dogs."
Washington	Walla Walla		2,000 – 2,400	First Congregational Church parking lot – Alder Street, Fourth Avenue, Main Street and Palouse Street
Washington	Wenatchee		< 2,000	community center parking lot – Chelan Ave
Washington	Yakima		700–1,000	The marchers went from City Hall to a Unitarian Universalist church.
West Virginia	Charleston		3,000	Organizers of the Women's March on West Virginia counted 2,800 people who marched around the Capitol complex following the demonstration, though hundreds more had stayed behind to sing and dance on the steps.
West Virginia	Davis		12	
West Virginia	Fairmont		100	Fairmont Senior High School
West Virginia	Romney		30–50	
Wisconsin	Appleton		3	Two women in town to audition at Lawrence University joined with a solitary demonstrator at Houdini Plaza.
Wisconsin	Bayfield		400+	Gwaaba'amaw Women's March began at the Apostle Island National Lakeshore Information Center
Wisconsin	Eau Claire		250+	Water Street – Phoenix Park
Wisconsin	Fort Atkinson		200+	Main Street bridge
Wisconsin	Green Bay		200	Protesters marched over the Ray Nitschke Memorial Bridge.
Wisconsin	Hayward		80	Women, men and children marched up Main Street and then gathered in front of the Sawyer County Courthouse for speeches.
Wisconsin	Hillsboro		40+	More than 40 women, men and children marched in Hillsboro (population 1,400).
Wisconsin	La Crosse		76–100	Protesters met under the clock tower at UWL and then marched down State Street to the downtown area.
Wisconsin	Madison		75,000–100,000	The protest occurred around the Wisconsin State Capitol and along State Street in Madison.
Wisconsin	Menomonie		400+	University of Wisconsin-Stout Clocktower Plaza – intersection of Broadway Street and Crescent Street – Stout footbridge – Menomonie Public Library
Wisconsin	Milwaukee		1,000	Around 1,000 gathered for a march through Milwaukee that ended at a local brewery.
Wisconsin	Minocqua		300+	Calvary Lutheran Church – Torpy Park
Wisconsin	Plymouth		200	Veterans Memorial Park
Wisconsin	Sheboygan		300	Fountain Park
Wisconsin	Wausau		200+	A supportive march was held at the 400 Block in rainy weather.
Wyoming	Casper		300 – 1,000	From Beech St. Splashpad to the Lyric Theater, hundreds marched through downtown Casper, significantly more than the organizers expectations.
Wyoming	Cheyenne		1,500–2,000	Wyoming Supreme Court
Wyoming	Cody		500	The Women and Allies March of Park County assembled in City Park.
Wyoming	Jackson Hole		1,000+	More than 500 gathered at the Town Square and twice that number – an estimated more than 1,000 people – participated in the 10-block march.
Wyoming	Lander		350	400 Baldwin Creek Road
Wyoming	Laramie		60	Laramie Plains Civic Center (caravan for Cheyenne march)
Wyoming	Pinedale		150	
Wyoming	Rock Springs		105	(Jan 22) Sweetwater Memorial Hospital parking lot – Western Wyoming Community College
