= We Are Family =

We Are Family may refer to:

== Film and television ==
- We Are Family (2010 film), an Indian drama
- We Are Family (2016 film), a French comedy
- We Are Family (2002 film), directed by Danny Schechter
- We Are Family (2006 Hong Kong film), directed by Clifton Ko
- We Are Family (2006 Singaporean film), produced by Chan Pui Yin
- We Are Family (TV series), a 2024 American music game show
- "We Are Family" (ALF), a 1988 TV episode
- "We Are Family" (Grounded for Life), a 2002 TV episode
- "We Are Family" (Popular), a 2000 TV episode
- "We Are Family" (Rizzoli & Isles), a 2013 TV episode

== Music ==
- We Are Family (album), a 1979 album by Sister Sledge
  - "We Are Family" (song), a 1979 song from the album
- We Are Family, a 2009 album by Jeff & Sheri Easter
- "We Are (Family)", a theme song from the 2012 film Ice Age: Continental Drift

== Organizations ==
- We Are Family (LGBTQI+ charity), a nonprofit organization
- We Are Family (Slovakia), a political party
- We Are Family Foundation, a nonprofit organization

== See also ==
- "We Are Family: Now Get Me Some Water!", a 2007 episode of Hannah Montana
