= Brittlebank Park =

Park in Charleston, South Carolina, U.S.

Coordinates: 32.7877°N 79.9606°W

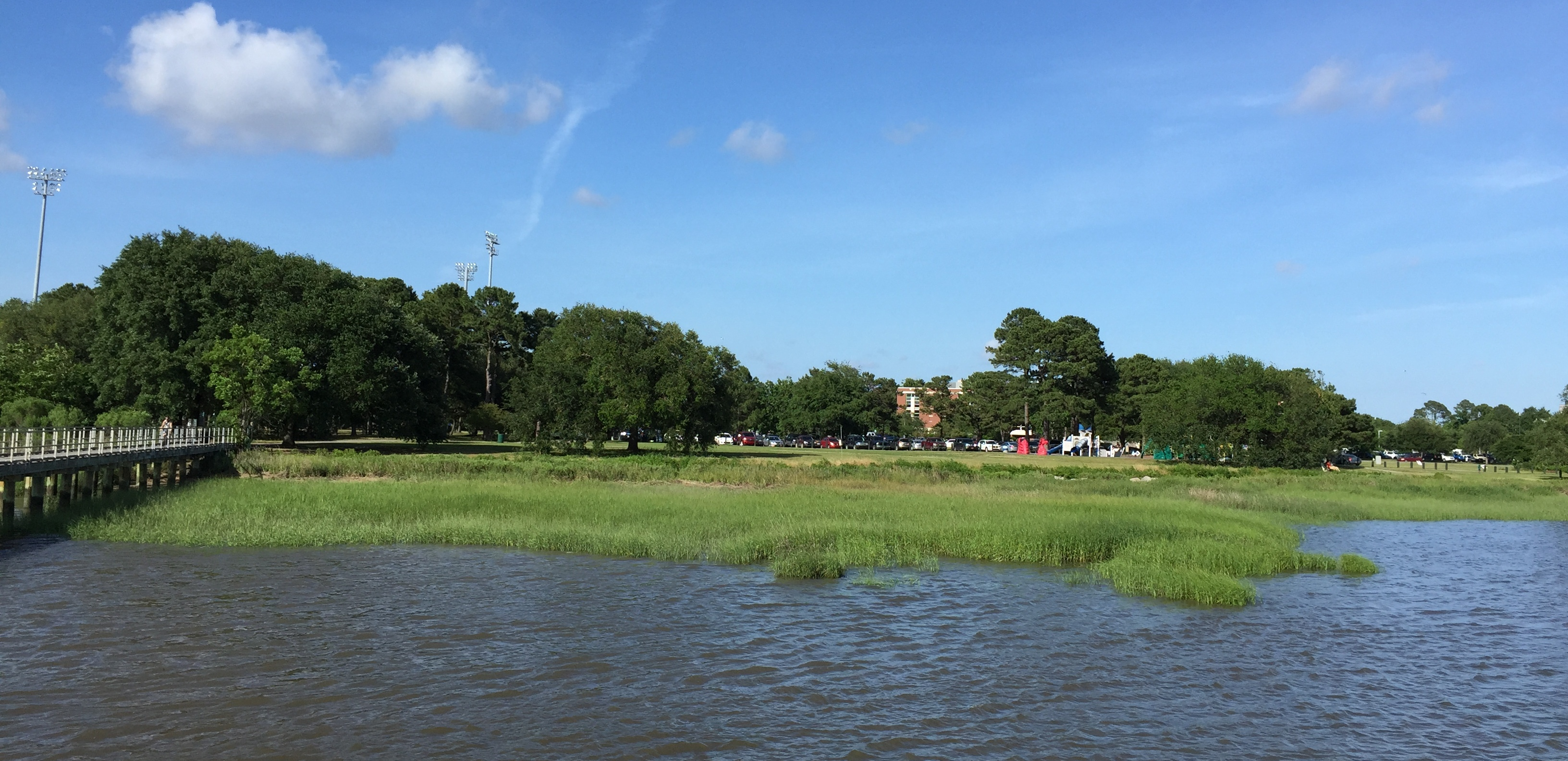
- Brittlebank Park is located along the Ashley River in Charleston, South Carolina.
- Interactive map of Brittlebank Park
- Area: 10 acres (4.0 ha)
- Created: 1975
- Operator: City of Charleston

Brittlebank Park is a ten-acre (4.0 ha) park located between Lockwood Boulevard (to the east) and the Ashley River (to the west) in Charleston, South Carolina near Gadsden Creek. To the south is a condominium project and to the north is the minor league baseball stadium, the Joseph P. Riley Jr. Park.

== History ==
The land upon which Brittlebank Park is built was used as a landfill and garbage dump, opened in 1954 and closed in 1970 when the United States Corps of Engineers charged that it was polluting the Ashley River.

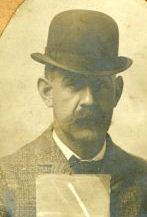
Julius Brittlebank was photographed in 1901 while living in Charleston, South Carolina.

The park is named for Julius Brittlebank (1859-1937), who made his fortune by starting as an office boy in a grits mill in Indiana and eventually formed his own company, Hudnut Milling Co., at the turn of the twentieth century. He had settled in Charleston in 1889, and he died in 1937 in Hawaii during his eighteenth trip around the world. In his will, he left about $89,000 to each of three cities for the construction of parks including one in Charleston and two in Indiana. His estate's gift was triggered upon the death of his son, Frank Brittlebank, on November 26, 1966. The conditions were that the cities had to name the parks in honor of Mr. Brittlebank and maintain the parks. Charleston's City Council accepted the money on January 24, 1967.

Plans were developed that called for the construction of the park in three stages starting in 1973 with landfill and tree plantings. The park was built in 1975.

Two acres at the northern end of the park were given to the Citadel (The Military College of South Carolina) as part of a complex land swap with the City of Charleston. The transfer, approved by the State of South Carolina in December 1993, was necessary for the construction of Joseph P. Riley Jr. Park.

== Features ==
Brittlebank Park is a largely passive park along the waterfront. The Charleston Department of Leisure Services sought permission build a boardwalk and dock at the park in December 1977 at the northern end, but the pier was not completed until 1992. The park includes a playground which was specifically crafted to accommodate handicapped children.

== Use as a Special Event Venue ==
Because of its largely open design, Brittlebank Park has been a popular location for special events such as musical events, sporting tournaments, and political protests.

In 1987, residents gathered at Brittlebank Park to mark Harmonic Convergence Day.

Starting in 1989, a local radio station hosted a large series of concerts at Brittlebank Park known as "WaveFest" (in honor of the 96 Wave station). The event quickly grew too large for the venue with as many as 75,000 people attending in 1995. City Council adopted a limit on the size of such events at Brittlebank Park, and the 1996 edition was moved to another site in Charleston. In 1999, the park was the location for another musical event hosted by a radio station, the Z-93 Budweiser Reggae Festival.

In 2011, Brittlebank Park was the center for the Occupy movement's Charleston efforts.

Since 2013, Brittlebank Park has hosted the Charleston Pride Festival at the end of Charleston Pride Week.
