= We Are Family (LGBTQ charity) =

- Founded: 1995
- Type: Nonprofit organization
- Location: North Charleston, South Carolina
- Region served: Charleston, South Carolina
- Key people: Nijeeah Richardson, Executive Director
- Employees: 3
- Website: www.wearefamilycharleston.org

We Are Family (WAF) is a nonprofit organization providing support and resources to lesbian, gay, bisexual, transgender, queer, questioning, and intersex (LGBTQI) youth in the Charleston, South Carolina area.

== History ==
WAF was founded in 1995 in Charleston by Tom Myers as a support group for gay youth after his son came out as gay. This organization makes a large effort in the community to provide a safe place for the LGBTQI homeless. In 2017 the group was granted $3,000 to study the incidence of homelessness in LGBTQI+ youth in the Greater Charleston area.

Melissa Moore, former executive director of WAF in 2018, opened a day center for homeless at 529 Meeting St. in what was previously a Head Start facility. The facility opened in conjunction with the Charleston YWCA, Dorchester Mental Health Center, Art Pot, Loving Arms, and Origin SC. After being open at this location for three months, the lease was taken over by the Military Community Connection.

In 2019, under Nijeeah Richardson, the current executive director, WAF moved from the "All of Us" homeless shelter on Meeting St. to North Charleston, next door to the Equality Hub which houses the offices of the Alliance for Full Acceptance, an LGBTQ advocacy nonprofit, and Charleston Pride.

== Programs ==
=== GSA Coalition ===
In January 2020, WAF organized the GSA Coalition, a group aiming to bring together gay-straight alliance or gender-sexuality alliance (often called GSA) groups from local Charleston-area middle and high schools. Students from this coalition sued in the case Gender and Sexuality Alliance v. Spearman to strike down the 1988 South Carolina Comprehensive Health Education Act that prohibited discussion of same-sex relationships in schools except in the context of sexually transmitted infections. Federal District Court Judge David C. Norton ruled the law unconstitutional, rendering that section of the law unenforceable.

=== Closet Case Thrift Store ===
In 2018, WAF opened a thrift store to raise money to support its work, while offering space for community members to shop for affordable clothing. The store, Closet Case Thrift Store was initially located at 529 Meeting Street, in WAF's All of Us Resource Center for the homeless. The store was vandalized in September 2018 with bricks thrown through the windows, resulting in $4,000 worth of damages. The store was also burglarized in November of that year. Closet Case Thrift Store closed when WAF moved its offices to North Charleston. It officially reopened in August 2019.

While this space serves as a thrift store, it's also a meeting place for We are Family's programming area, this allows them to increase their impact across the Tri-County Area. The store is a gender-inclusive shopping space. A gender-inclusive environment does not discriminate against a particular sex, social gender, or gender identity, and does not perpetuate gender stereotypes. According to the WAF website, you can expect to find a selection of clothing from high-end vintage to trendy styles. They also have some knick-knacks and rare collectibles. Closet Case Thrift is the only LGBT owned and operated thrift store in South Carolina. Also, it is run based on donations only. Revenue from the thrift store will be used to help the program operate resources such as the computer lab, laundry, showers, medical clinic, food services and more. Other than donations the thrift store gives WAF the majority of their revenue to continue the organization.
