= Gadsden Creek =

Stream in South Carolina, U.S.

- Location within South Carolina
- Location: Charleston, South Carolina
- Coordinates: 32°47′10″N 79°57′32″W
- Basin countries: United States of America
- Surface area: 4 acres (1.6 ha)

Gadsden Creek is the last tidal creek near Brittlebank Park which is on the Charleston peninsula. Whether or not the present-day Gadsden Creek is the same one as the historic creek bearing the same name or instead a perimeter drainage ditch carved out of a landfill in the 1950s is in dispute. Starting in 1952, the city of Charleston used the 100-acre creek and surrounding wetlands as a landfill which either completely filled the historic Gadsden Creek or diminished the creek to four acres.

In 2015, plans by the developers of a nearby high-end housing development, WestEdge, to fill the ecologically-damaged creek created controversy in the city of Charleston. Opponents of filling Gadsden Creek believe that filling the creek disenfranchises the historic African American Gadsden Green (also known as the Back Da Green) community. While proponents of the plan believe that modern-day Gadsden Creek is just a "reiteration" of the waterway with historic ties to the African American community and that filling the creek will cut off the creek's pollutants from leaking into the Ashley River.

In 2021, the South Carolina Department of Health and Environmental Control approved WestEdge's plan to fill the creek.

== History of the creek and area ==
Gadsden Creek was included in an 1852 plat that subdivided Thomas Gadsden's extensive real estate for resale.

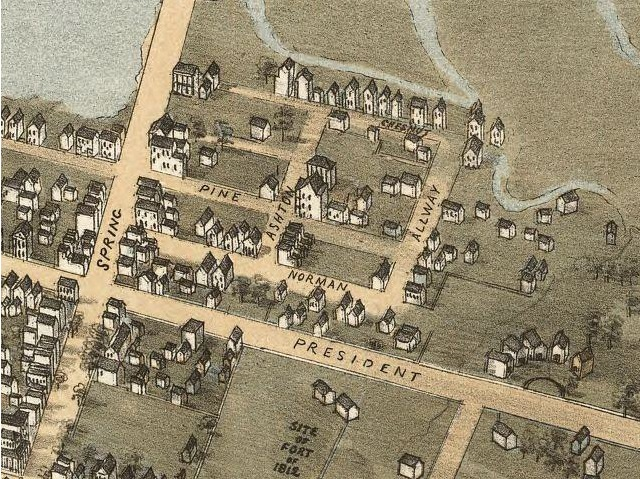
Gadsden Creek was shown on the 1872 Bird's Eye View of Charleston as a creek curving around the corner of "Chesnut" (now Hagood Ave.) and Allway Street. (North is to the right in this view.)

Gadsden Creek was a popular and undeveloped swimming spot throughout the eighteenth and nineteenth centuries. It derives its name from Thomas Gadsden, the grandson of Christopher Gadsden, who once owned the land. Beginning in the late-nineteenth century, structures appeared nearby in an area which became known as Butcher Town. By the early-1920s, an African-American neighborhood called Fiddler's Green was located where Butcher Town once stood near the upper portion of the creek. Many of the Fiddler's Green homes wear destroyed by a tornado in 1938 and the debris from their destruction filled a portion of the creek. Fiddler's Creek later became known as Gadsden Green and from the 1930s to the 1970s, the city of Charleston seized land from African Americans in the neighborhood to build public housing. In 1958, Charleston's mayor, William Morrison talking about that process of filling in the creek stated to the city's Ways and Means committee that:

"We [the city] are reclaiming more than 100 acres of marshland in the area between Spring Street and The Citadel on the Ashley River waterfront [the Gadsden Green neighborhood]. Numerous suggestions have been made as to the uses to which these properties should be put ... We are now producing through landfill development an average of 15 plus acres per year, when converted into cash means one-half-million dollars per year in city assets which, as I have said before, and I say again, is cash in the bank."

Gadsden Creek was once one of many tidal creeks on the Charleston peninsula, the historic center of the city, but it is now the last creek remaining. From the 1950s to the 1970s, the city filled the unlined 100-acre creek and the surrounding wetlands with an estimated 1.5 million pounds of garbage. In 2020, the creek consisted of just four acres which are considered heavily-polluted. But, the idea that Gadsden Creek is even a creek, much less the Gadsden Creek recorded in antebellum accounts, is disputed.

== Plans to fill and ongoing controversy ==
In 2014, city officials and developers announced the plan for a mixed-use project consisting of apartments, parking garages, and biotechnical research facilities with the aim that it would become a "global hub for research." At the time of the Horizon District's announcement (later renamed WestEdge), the future of Gadsden Creek was uncertain. But, on April 15, 2015, the Horizon Project Foundation filed for a permit with the South Carolina Department of Health and Environmental Control to fill the majority of the creek with concrete and to construct a drain to replace the creek's draining function. In June 2021, DHEC approved the plan to fill the creek. The Corps of Engineers has the final say on whether the creek will be filled.

=== Opponents and proponents ===
An organization called Friends of Gadsden Creek formed in 2018 to oppose the filing of the creek. The group believes that WestEdge's plans to fill the Gadsden creek disenfranchises the local African American community called Gadsden Green (also known as Back Da Green) and that pollutant tests conducted by companies hired by the developer were unreliable. The city of Charleston hired its own environmental firm to conduct tests which will be released in August 2020. Local state representative, Wendell Gilliard, came out against WestEdge's plans in 2019. Gilliard stated that he believed that the plan could lead to more flooding. Additionally, the city-sponsored Dutch Dialogues flood management report did not recommend for Gadsden Creek to be filled.

The CEO of the WestEdge Foundation, Michael Maher, wrote in support of his organization's plan that what is perceived to be the historic Gadsden Creek is actually a perimeter ditch and that:

"The ditch was moved twice by re-excavating into the trash. Archival photos and soil testing confirm the ditch sits above 10-15 feet of methane-producing waste containing pollutants that continuously risk leaching into tides and out to the Ashley River. Our only protection is an eroded soil cap that tries to keep the unlined landfill from mixing with every tidal flow."

Many environmental groups initially opposed the filling of the creek, including Charleston Waterkeeper and the Coastal Conservation League. But in 2019, the executive directors of both organizations released an op-ed declaring support for WestEdge's plan. They stated that "today's creek has little in common" with the creek in the 1940s, that its pollution poses an enormous risk to people and wildlife living nearby, and that the creek no longer drained naturally. Additionally, they cited WestEdge's promise to improve drainage in the area as well as to restore twenty acres in the same watershed as "making sense" for the site. In 2020, leaders of Friends of Gadsden Creek criticized both organizations for their stance and for lacking diversity on their staff and board.
