= 2017 Lincoln Nebraska Women's March =

Political rallies for women's rights

The 2017 Lincoln Nebraska Women's March was a political demonstration of approximately 3,000 to 4,000 women in Lincoln, Nebraska. It took place on January 21, 2017, the day after the inauguration of President Donald Trump. The Lincoln march was part of a larger movement of anti-Trump women's marches that happened across the United States.

Protesters gathered in downtown Lincoln, Nebraska to express their solidarity for women's rights issues. They marched from the UNL Student Union to the State Capitol seven blocks away. Lincoln was one of three locations that hosted a march in Nebraska, with Omaha and Loup City being the other two. The nationwide Women's March of January 21, 2017 has been estimated as the largest single-day demonstration in United States history. The Lincoln March reoccurs every year, including 2020, when held virtually due to the COVID-19 pandemic.

== 2017 Event Logistics ==
=== Organizers ===
The local march was primarily organized through Facebook by Gwendolen (Wendy) Hines, a resident of Lincoln, Nebraska.

=== Candidates/Speakers ===
Three speakers addressed the crowd at the Nebraska capitol building: Rev. Karla Cooper, who is ordained in the African Methodist Episcopal Church, Danielle Conrad, Executive Director of ACLU Nebraska, and Meg Mikolajczyk, Public Affairs Manager at Planned Parenthood of the Heartland. Rev. Cooper closed the ceremony with song, and together thousands of participants joined arms and sang "This Little Light of Mine."

Across the country, over 670 affiliate marches popped up in collaboration with the Women's March on Washington. It is estimated that over 4.5 million people attended the marches, according to the Women's March on Washington's official website. The event was created to promote unity and equal rights for all regardless of gender, race, or religion in the wake of President Donald Trump's election.

== Controversy ==
=== UNL Fraternity Scandal ===
The event started at the University of Nebraska–Lincoln campus. As the crowd passed the Phi Gamma Delta fraternity, commonly referred to as Fiji, fifty members were outside harassing protest participants, counter-protesting, or supporting Trump shouting phrases such as "No means yes" while flying Trump flags from their balcony, bringing media attention to the event.

==== Campus Response ====
The university investigated the students’ actions at the event, ultimately suspending the chapter for multiple violations, including alcohol abuse, hazing, and inappropriate sexual behavior. The house was not on active status until 2019, when members were allowed to return.

=== Nebraska State Senator Twitter Scandal ===
Nebraska State Senator Bill Kintner retweeted a controversial tweet by conservative political radio host Larry Elder during the day of protest, a picture of three women protesting at the rally, Elder quoted the tweet and said "Ladies I think you're fine." The Nebraska State Senate was planning on voting for Kinter's removal, but he resigned before the vote was held.

== See also ==
- 2017 Women's March
- List of 2017 Women's March locations
