= Charleston Pride =

Annual LGBT event in Charleston, South Carolina

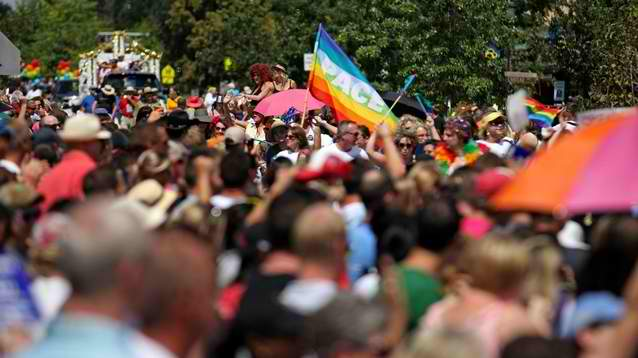
- Charleston Pride Parade on July 14, 2012
- Genre: Pride parade
- Location: Charleston, South Carolina

Charleston Pride is a week-long festival that takes place annually in Charleston, South Carolina. The festival is a celebration of the Charleston LGBT community, highlighted by educational events, parties, networking opportunities, and its popular parade and rally.

Charleston's first Pride event, a three-day event including a parade, rally and before and after-party and beach day, was organized by Charleston Pride Organization in 2009 with the first Annual Parade on May 15, 2010. Over 4,000 people showed up for the first parade. Charleston Pride Festival, Inc. was established in 2011 to build on the momentum of that first Pride event, and organizers continued festivities for three days, adding the film festival and art walk. In its third year, 2012, a fourth day was added to the schedule for beach activities. In 2013, the festival was lengthened to fill an entire week and it also marked Charleston Pride's move to downtown Charleston.

Local organizers and media report attendance of 8,000 to 11,000 at the rally in Riverfront Park during Charleston's third annual event, and is showing to be a possible force in Charleston's tourist industry. Along with the annual festival, the organization fundraises throughout the year to support its mission to educate the community on LGBT issues, and assists with handling crisis intervention and suicide prevention among youth who identify as LGBT or question their sexuality. Charleston Pride Festival, Inc. is a 501(c)(3) public charity.
