= Women's March on Portland =

2017 protest in Portland, Oregon

- Part of 2017 Women's March
- Promotional artwork for the event
- Date: January 21, 2017
- Location: Portland, Oregon, United States
- Goals: Women's rights; human rights; immigrant rights; civil liberties; social justice
- Methods: Demonstration

Number
- Estimated 100,000

The Women's March on Portland, also known as the Portland Women's March, the Women's March on Washington, Portland, and Women's March Portland, was an event in Portland, Oregon. Scheduled to coincide with the 2017 Women's March, it was held on January 21, 2017, the day after the inauguration of Donald Trump. The march was one of the largest public protests in Oregon's history with crowd estimates as high as 100,000 participants. No arrests were made during the demonstration.

Plans for the Portland march began with a small group of women in Eastern Oregon on November 11, 2016, following Trump's election. Thousands of people expressed interest in attending the event on its Facebook page just days after its creation. Organizers wanted to focus on women's rights but were criticized for not addressing issues of diversity. On December 27, Oregon's liaison to the national Women's March overtook the original event page. A new page was created, inviting participation by a group of women who had complained about the lack of diversity. Margaret Jacobsen became the march's lead organizer on January 6, 2017.

Sponsors of the event included the Oregon chapter of the National Organization for Women (Oregon NOW) and the Greater Portland NOW chapter, PDX Trans Pride, and a regional affiliate of Planned Parenthood. The NAACP of Portland withdrew its support, citing the original organizers' failure to discuss discrimination affecting minority groups, specifically immigrants, Muslim women, and women of color. Following the march, the Oregon Department of Justice launched an investigation into a dispute between organizers over funds raised.

== Demonstration ==
=== Motivation ===
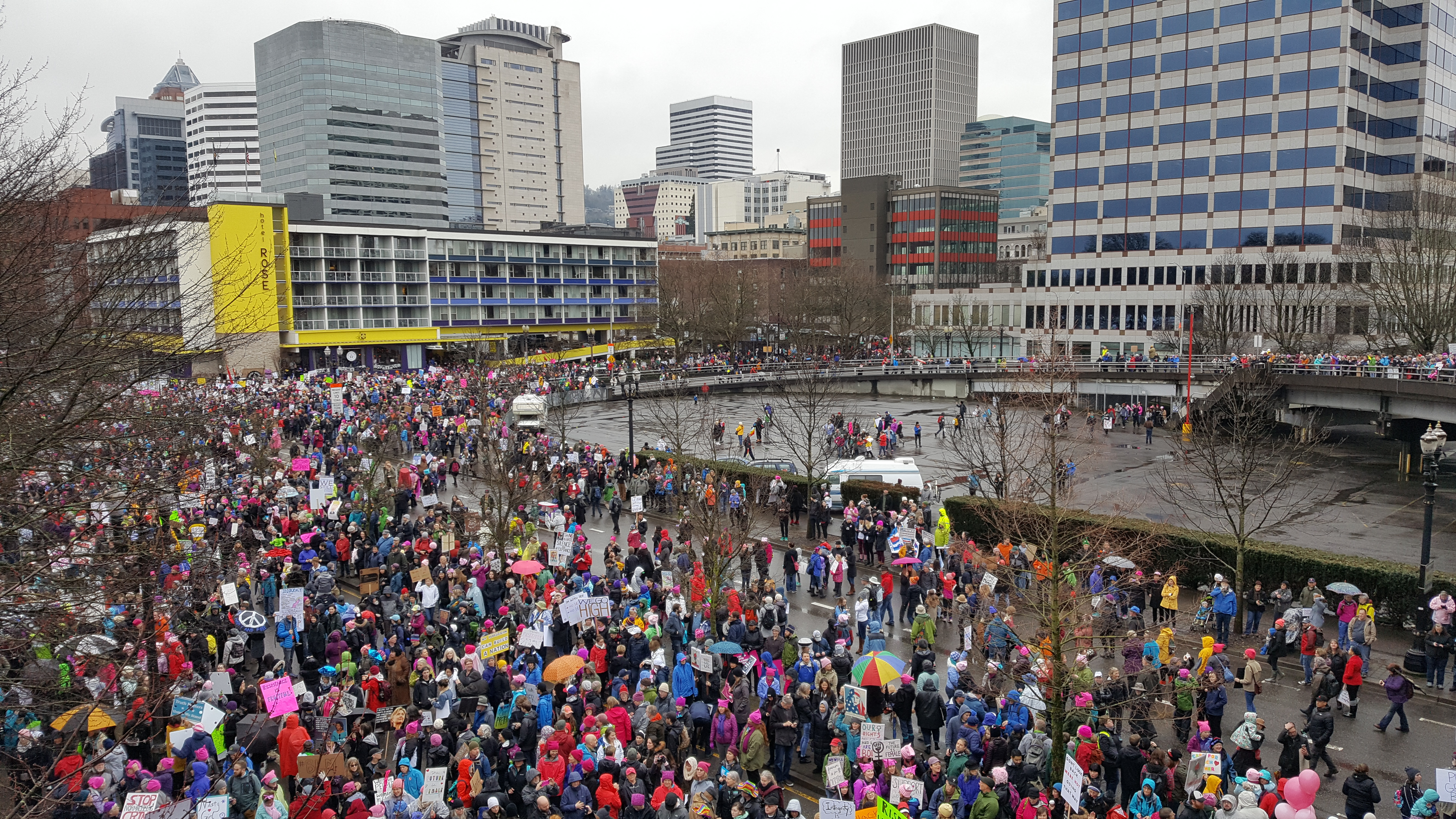
Protestors gathering along Southwest Naito Parkway before the noon rally

Many participants marched to support women's rights and to reinforce protests against Donald Trump, even though it was not officially billed as an "anti-Trump" event. Leading up to the march, The Portland Mercury's event description read: "Portland will absolutely be one of the cities engaging in this series of nationwide marches to show support for women's rights in the face of a serial sex-offender and his white supremacist friends entering the White House."

Shasta Kearns Moore of the Portland Tribune called the demonstration, "a reaction to the election of Donald Trump, and nearly all of the forces at work to upset politics in the 2016 presidential race were also in play in organizing the Portland march: social media, race, gender, the urban-rural divide, generational concepts of feminism and, most of all, lots of people feeling like they weren't being heard."

Organizers released a statement about the purpose of the demonstration:

The Women's March on Washington, Portland is aligned with the mission of the national march, which is a national movement to unify and empower everyone who stands for women's rights, human rights, immigrant rights, civil liberties, and social justice for all. This is a non-partisan, permitted and peaceful event where we march in solidarity with our partners and children for the protection of our rights, our safety, our health, and our families — recognizing that our vibrant and diverse communities are the strength of our country. Oregon and Greater Portland NOW and Planned Parenthood Columbia Willamette are two of our several sponsors and allies.

=== Logistics ===
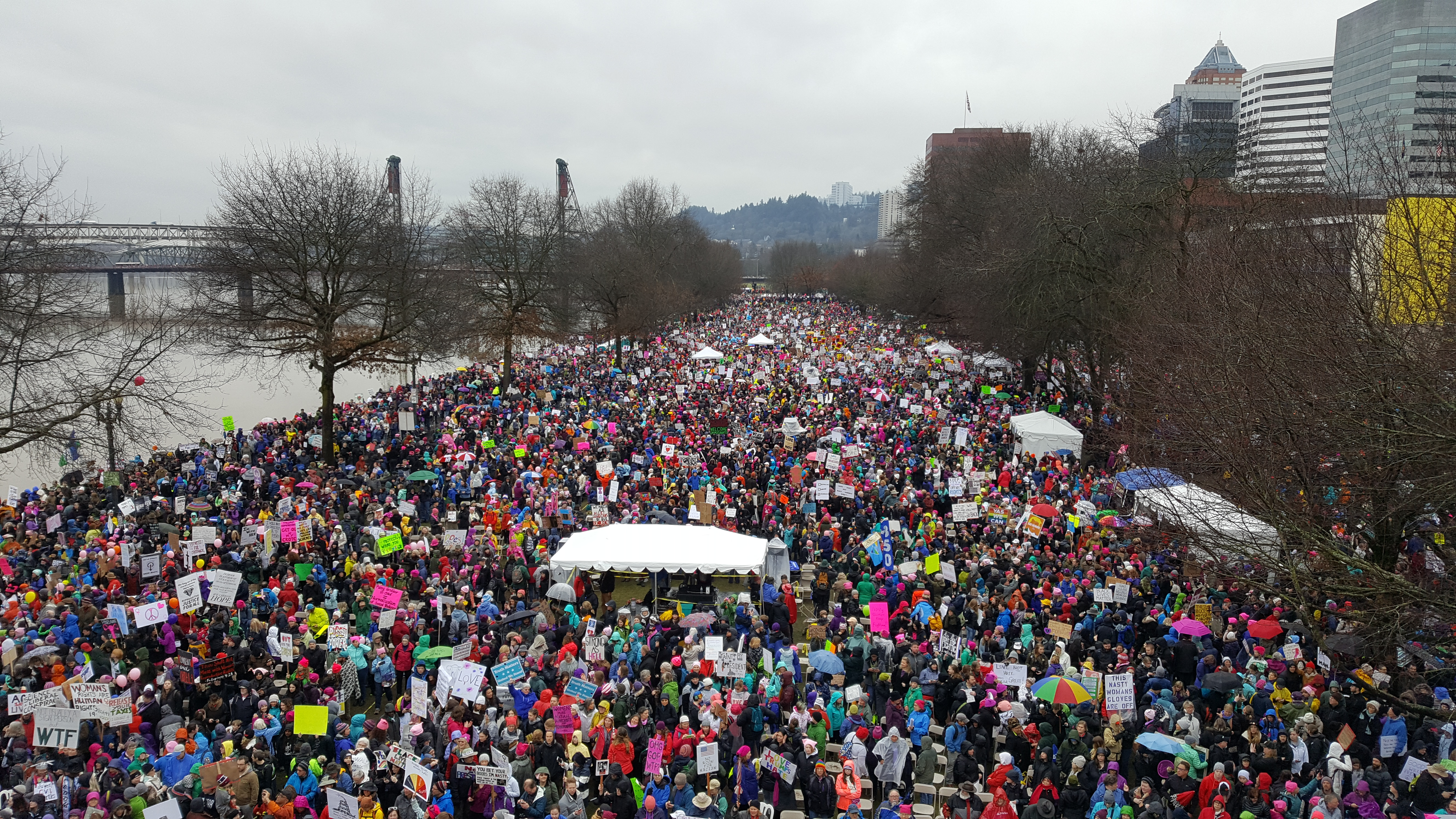
Marchers at Tom McCall Waterfront Park, south of the Morrison Bridge

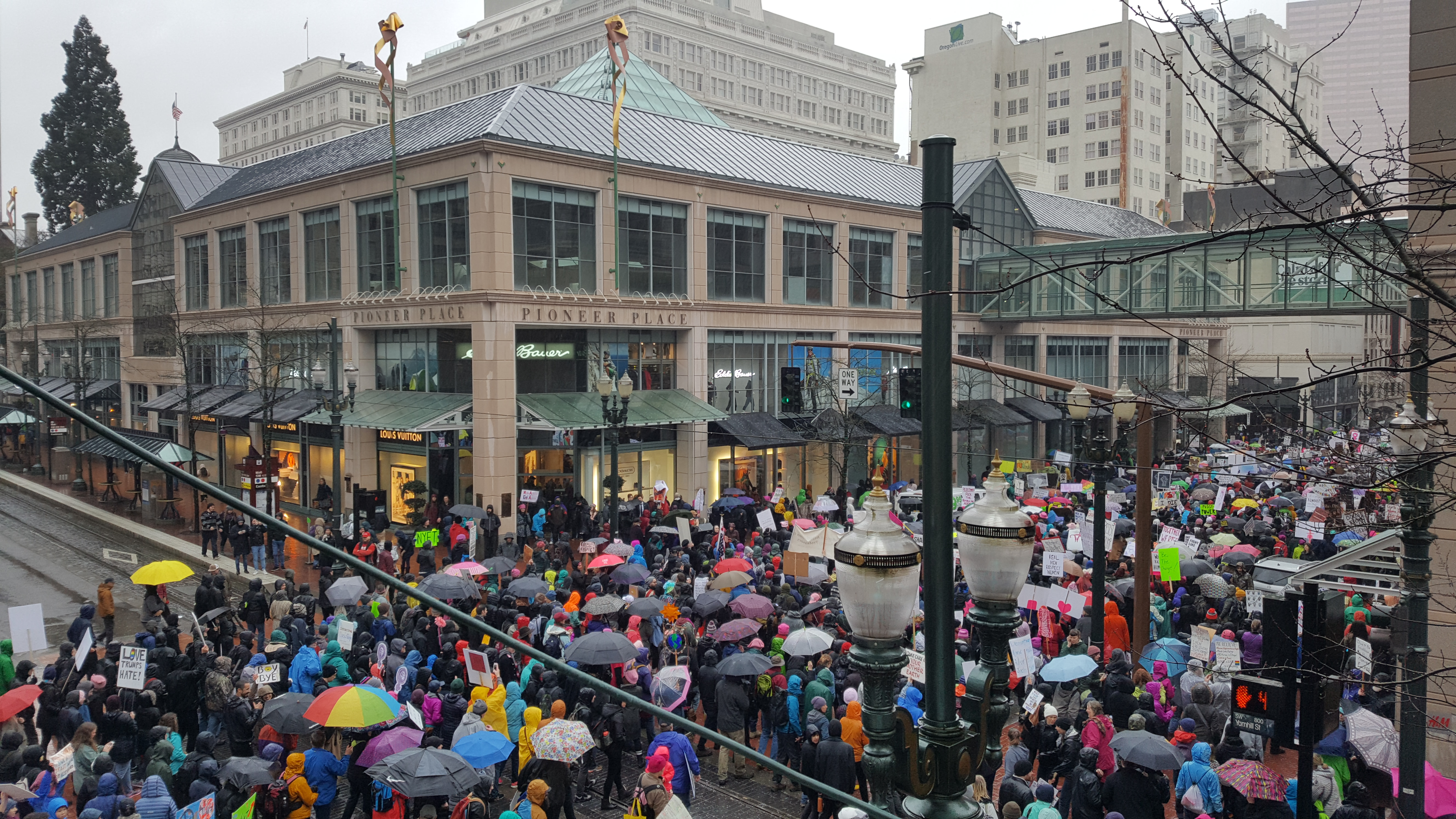
Demonstrators in front of Pioneer Place on Southwest Fourth Avenue

Prior to the event, the Women's March on Portland was expected to attract between 20,000 and 30,000 participants, potentially the largest demonstration in the city's history. More than 50,000 people had said they planned to attend on its Facebook page. Unlike some events held in conjunction with the national Women's March, Portland's protest was permitted, and the parade route was made public beforehand.

Preceding the march, which was billed as a family-friendly event, there was a rally for children and families, starting at 11:00 am. Speakers followed, along with chants, songs, and safety instructions for demonstrators with children. The protest was free to attend, but organizers were trying to raise $10,000 to cover event costs. Also preceding the march was a pro-labor rally at the South Park Blocks, after which 150 attendees joined the Women's March.

Participants assembled near the Morrison Bridge at Tom McCall Waterfront Park, then marched through a 44-block area of downtown Portland around noon before returning to the park. With an estimated length of between 1.3 and 2.2 mi (2.1 and 3.5 km), their route followed Southwest Naito Parkway to Jefferson Street, then Fourth Avenue to Pine Street. Marchers finished at Waterfront Park's Battleship Oregon Memorial, most of them dispersing by 3:30 pm.

=== Impact ===
The march became one of the largest public protests in Oregon history. Following the protest, organizers said 100,000 people attended. The Portland Police Bureau said the demonstration was "easily one of the largest marches ever in Portland", and reportedly estimated that between 50,000 and 100,000 people participated. News outlets published crowd estimates ranging from 70,000 to 100,000 demonstrators. The Portland Tribune said:

The rain-soaked event took on a festive atmosphere. So many people attended that it was impossible for everyone to see or hear speakers on the stage south of the Morrison Bridge. At 1:15 p.m., the official start time of the march, thousands were still crammed motionless in Waterfront Park.

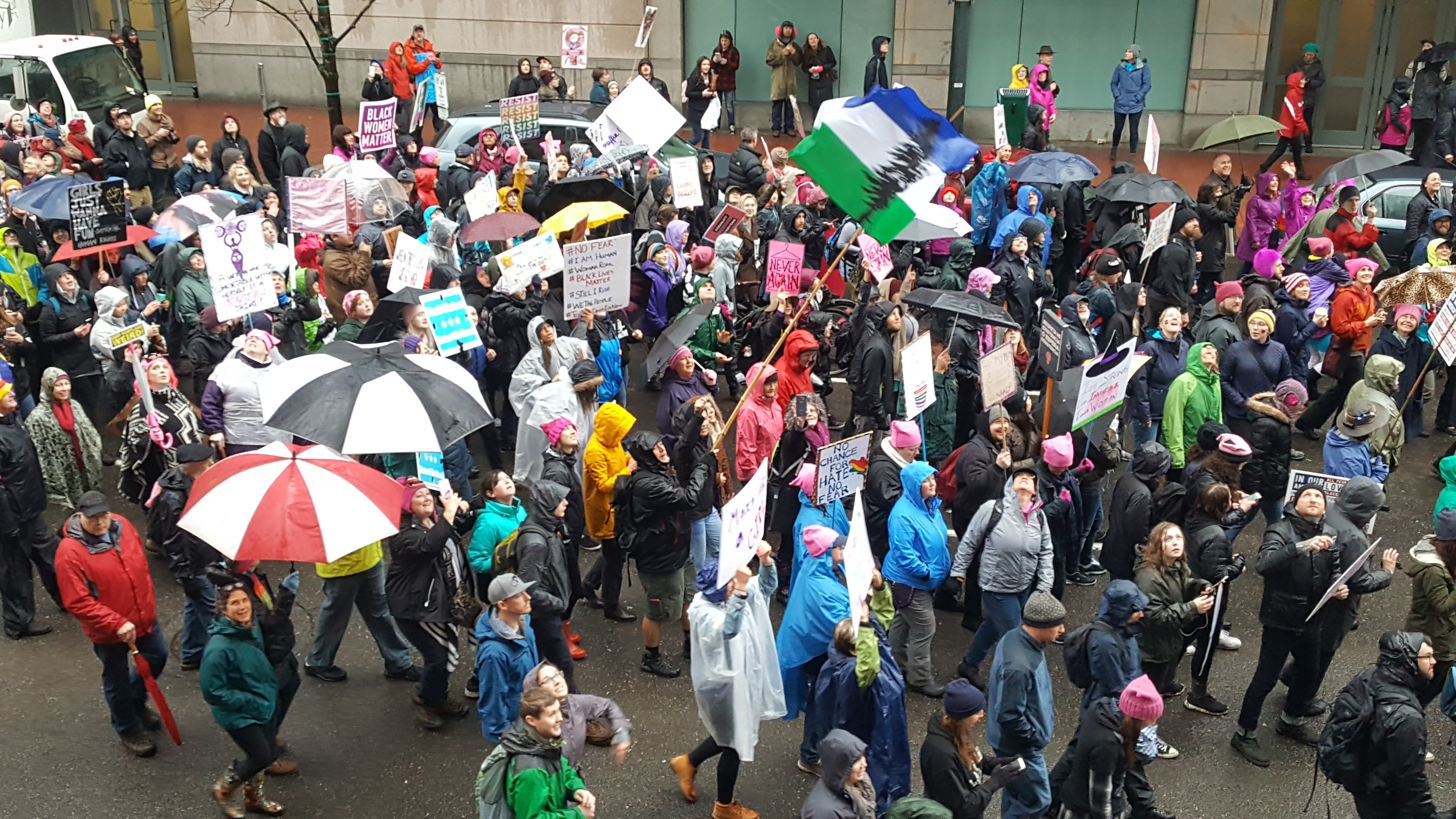
Protestors on Fourth Avenue

Local media outlets reported that, unlike other protests leading up to the march, there was a positive relationship between demonstrators and police. The Portland Tribune contrasted the event with the previous evening's protests and said the Women's March had a "carnival atmosphere full of smiles". The Oregonian's Kale Williams called the crowd "jubilant, almost to a person". The Portland Mercury's Dirk VanderHart described the event as "massive, jubilant, and lit", and called the crowd "a crush of wet, jubilant, Trump-hating humanity". Police said the march was "100 percent peaceful", and made no arrests. Sergeant Pete Simpson said, "This march was, we think, one of the largest in Portland history... and absolutely zero incidents or problems were reported. The credit really goes to the organizers for working with the city, meeting with the police bureau to help plan the route and allow us to get the proper resources in place."

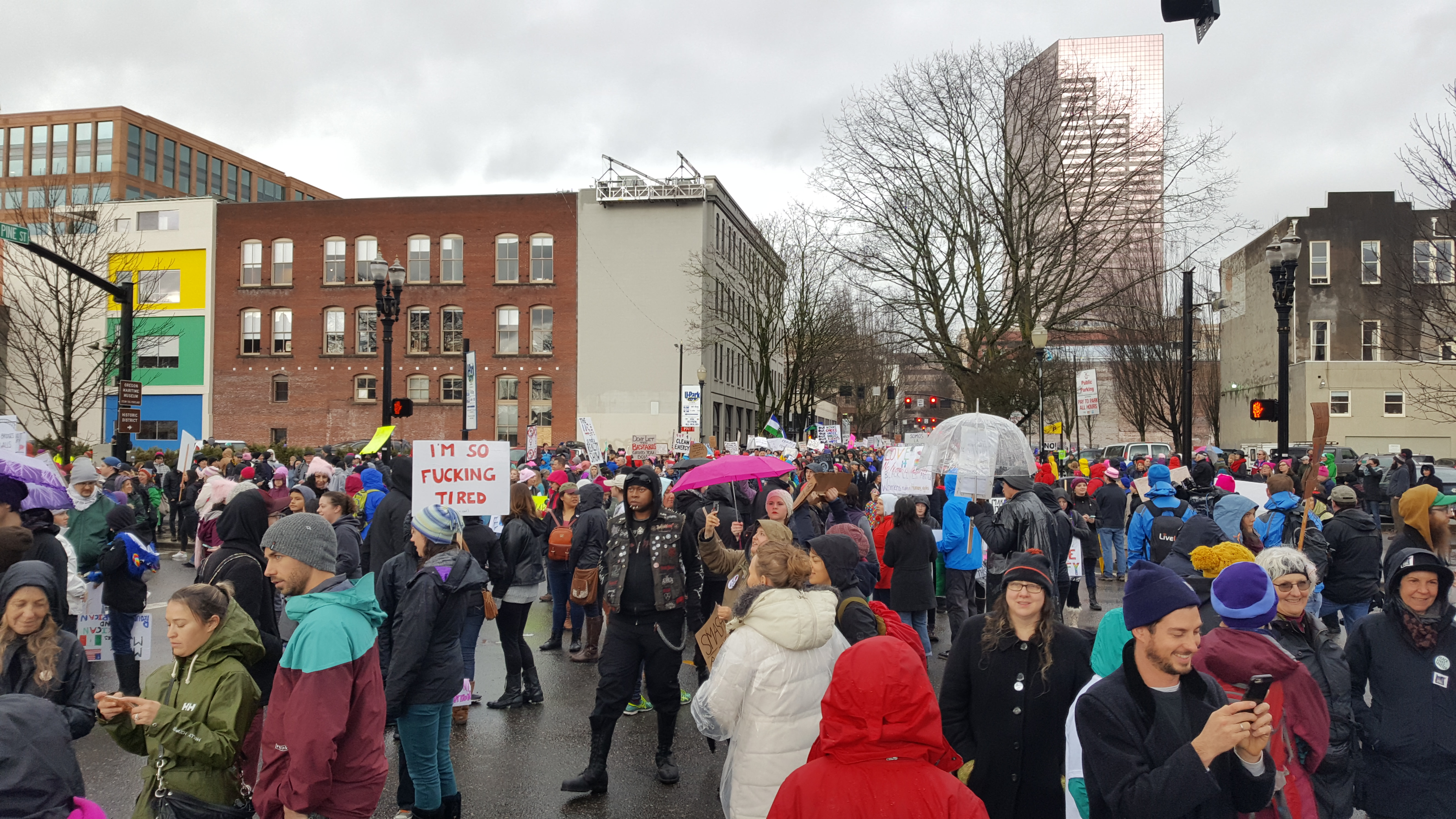
Marchers at the end of the route, along Waterfront Park

According to TriMet, the public transit agency served "a record number of people in a short amount of time". MAX Light Rail riders experienced delays because of increased usage, and shuttle buses carried riders between the Providence Park and Pioneer Courthouse/Southwest 6th and Pioneer Place/Southwest 5th stations. TriMet's bus services were also impacted, with passengers experiencing delays and detours as large crowds were bypassed. Increased demand caused the agency's ticketing app to stop working briefly just after noon. MAX Light Rail services resumed in the downtown core around 3:45 pm. TriMet services were altered the day before the Women's March because of anti-Trump protests in downtown Portland, but the agency did not anticipate service suspensions on the day of the march. Traffic backed up on Interstate 5 northbound, and was blocked by police on Southwest Naito Parkway near Tom McCall Waterfront Park and the Morrison Bridge.

== Leadership ==
=== Organizers ===
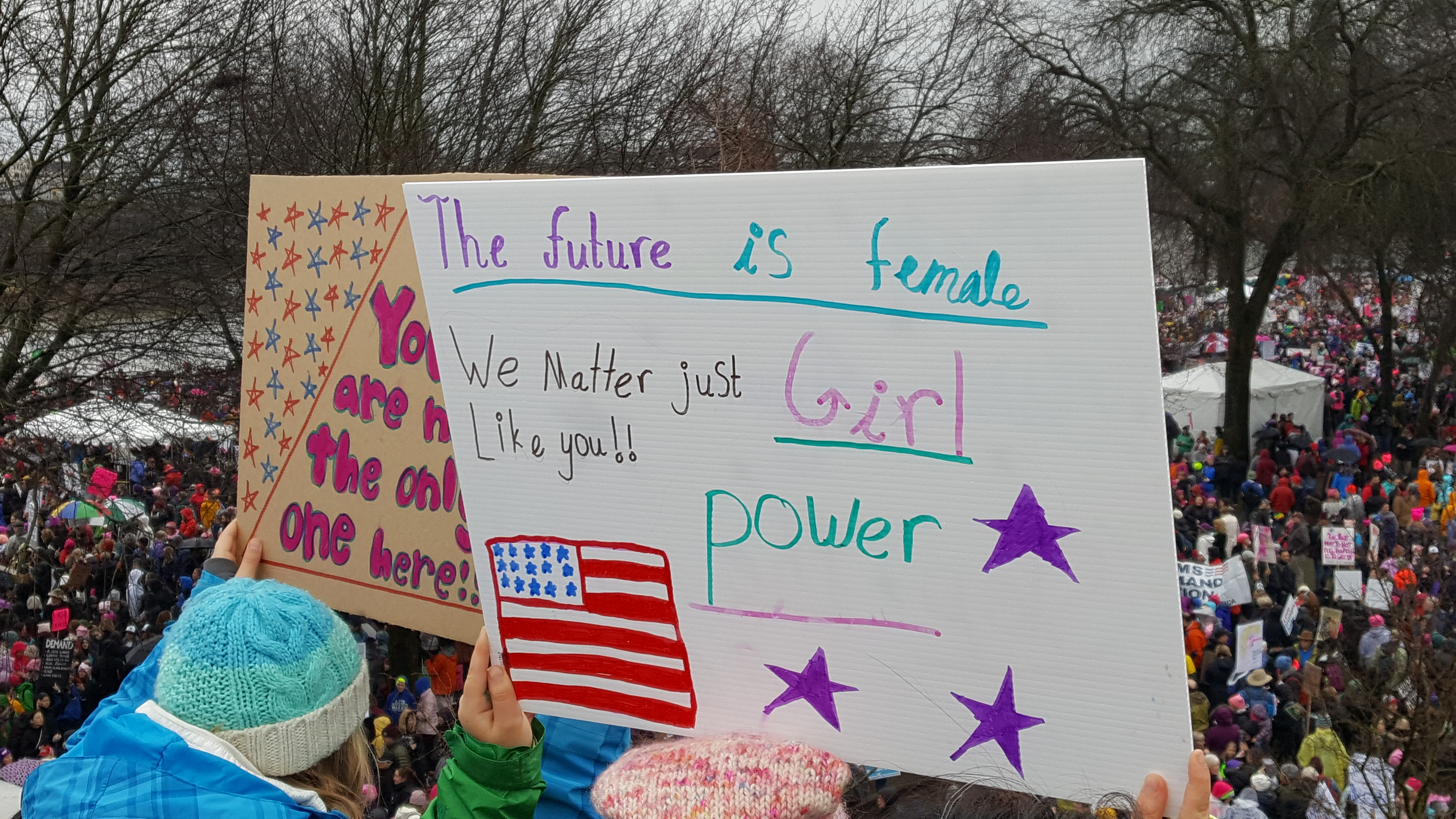
Demonstrators holding signs

Four women in Eastern Oregon initiated plans for a Portland demonstration on November 11, 2016, following the election of Donald Trump. Among them was Dara Glass, who described the group as "dots of blue in a sea of red". One of the organizers created a Facebook page announcing the event, and within a few days, thousands of people expressed their interest in attending. While 600 volunteers were recruited to help, the original organizers became frustrated as various groups began advocating for issues affecting them most. Leaders wanted to focus on women's rights; one of the original organizers explained, "It didn't matter what color you were, who you identified with. It was about the bigger picture."

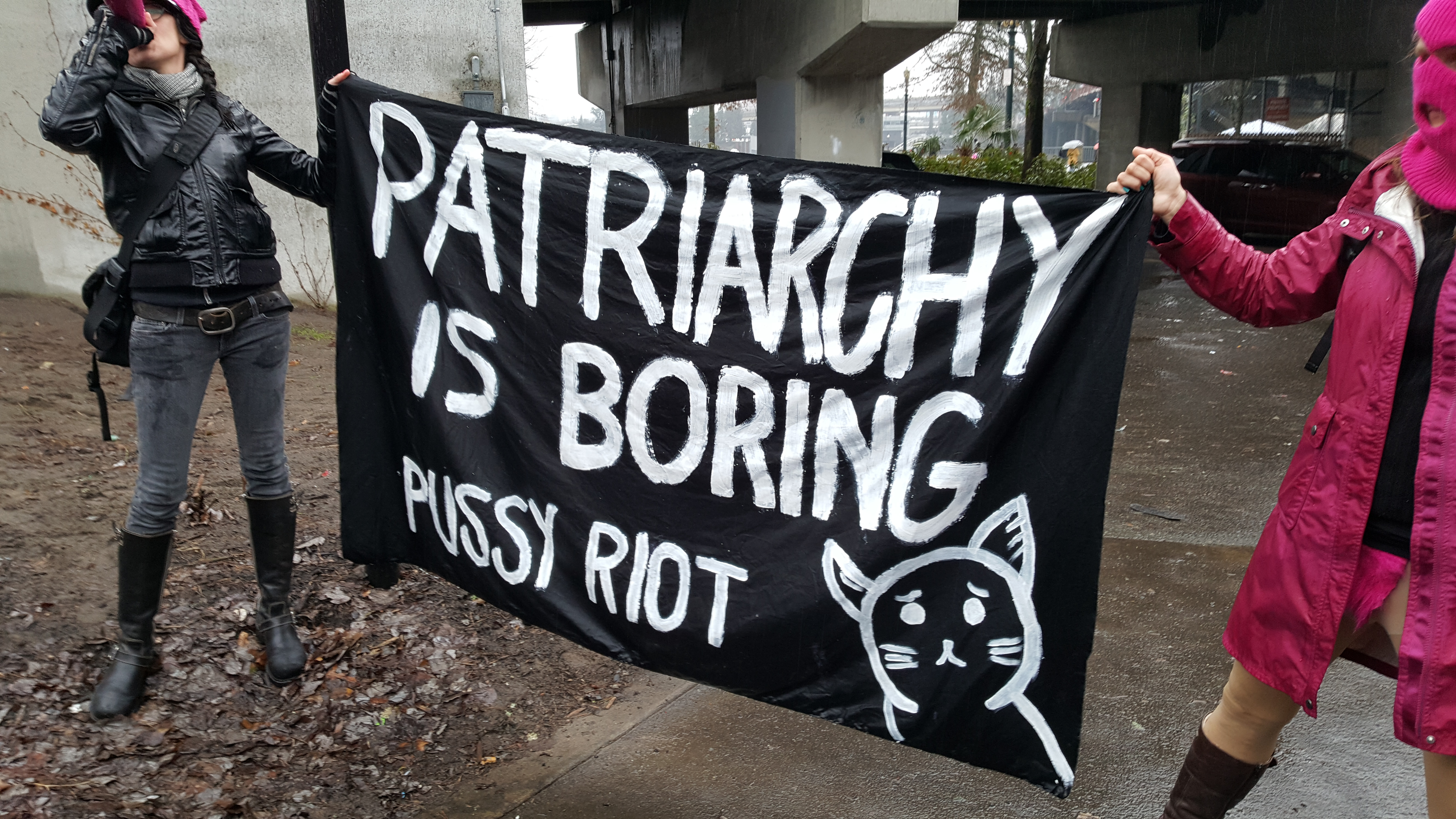
Signage referencing Pussy Riot

Despite their inclusion of a woman to speak about rights for trans women and adding an opportunity for Black Lives Matter supporters to stage a die-in to the program, the original organizers were criticized for not addressing issues of diversity. Online arguing resulted in moderators removing personal attacks and other comments. The conflict was not unique to Portland: Eugene resident Constance Van Flandern, serving as Oregon's "official liaison" to the national Women's March on Washington, was told similar disputes were taking place in cities throughout the United States. Moore attributed the disagreements to "how different generations view feminism". Similarly, Rachel Monahan of Willamette Week commented, "The conflict in Portland reflected strife that also occurred among national women's march planners. An older generation of feminists disagreed with younger activists about whether there could be unity on women's issues without reference to discrimination against racial, ethnic and sexual identities."

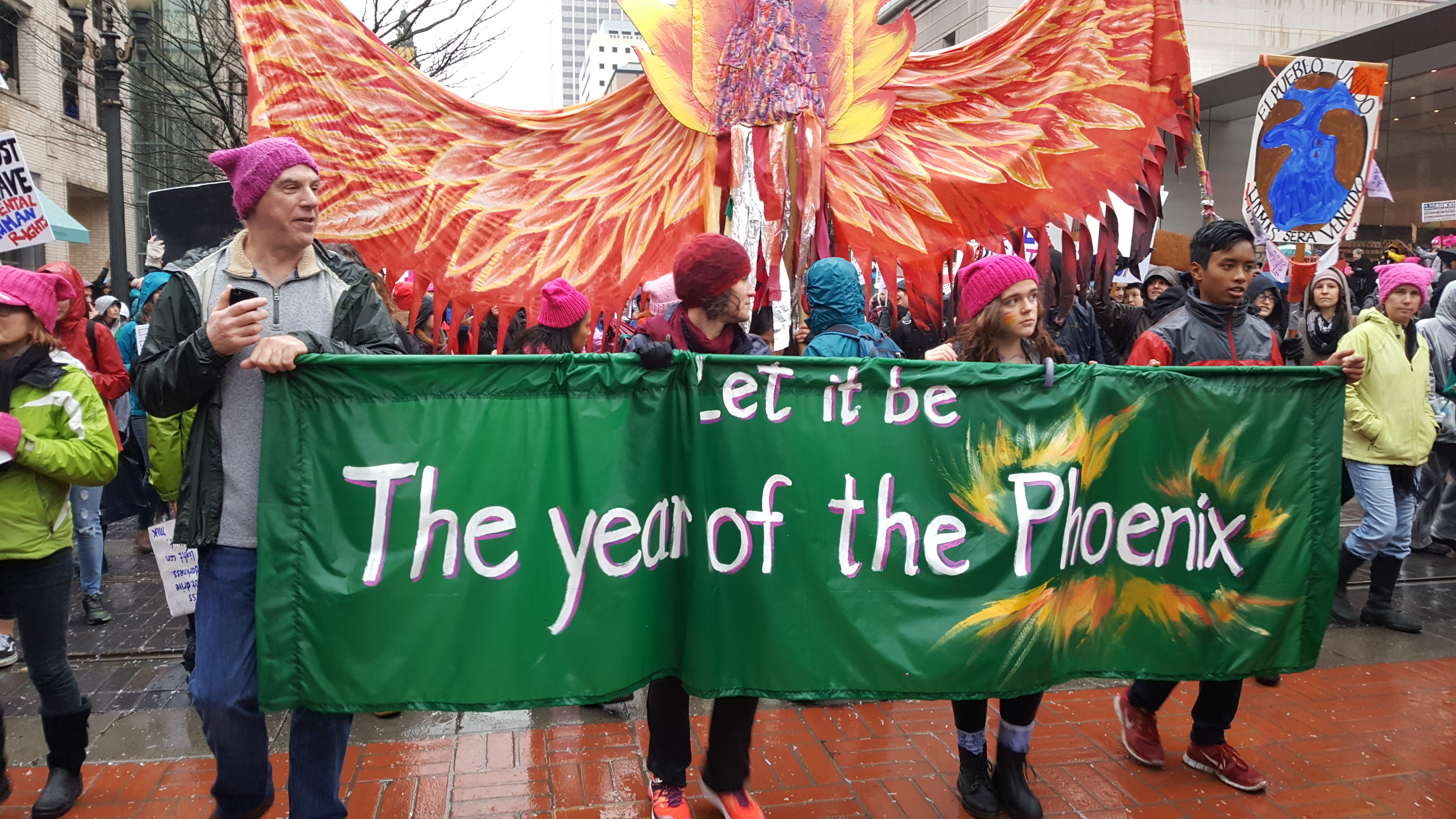
Protestors carrying a banner

On December 27, Van Flandern "stage[d] a hostile takeover" of the event's Facebook page and created a new one titled "Women's March on Washington: Portland". Her first nine invitations were extended to women who had previously complained about the lack of diversity. After the organizers in Eastern Oregon asked for assistance, Van Flandern appointed new administrators to the original Facebook group, removed blocks on previously banned individuals, and changed the graphics to mirror the new event page. In response, thousands more people said they planned to attend the demonstration. Margaret Jacobsen, a 29-year-old activist and writer identifying as a nonbinary polyamorist, joined the campaign on January 5, 2017, and became the march's lead organizer the following day. Rebekah Brewis, executive legal director of PDX Trans Pride, Nora Colie, Erica Fuller, and Kat Lattimer also served as organizers.

Seeking to make the march inclusive for people of any age, gender, or physical ability, the new organizers released a statement which read: "The Portland team has also made sure to have diverse representation, and is working hard to make sure the Portland march is an event of inclusion, and that the voices of women of color are heard and centered during the event." The women, along with mayor Ted Wheeler, police chief Michael Marshman, and members of the Portland Business Alliance, attended a press conference on January 18 during which organizers emphasized the importance of "self-policing". Wheeler said violence and vandalism would not be tolerated, and Marshman expressed the Bureau's support of the right to protest.

=== Politicians ===
Calling the march "an incredible day for Portland", Wheeler commented: "This has been a very positive, family friendly event. A lot of people out here expressing their First Amendment rights and doing so in a peaceful way. There is a strong value in this community to be engaged, active and expressive, and I strongly support that. We support peaceful protest." Earl Blumenauer, the U.S. representative for Oregon's 3rd congressional district, attended the march instead of Trump's inauguration. Senator Ron Wyden attended Trump's inauguration and the Women's March in Washington, D.C.

== Partnerships and participant groups ==
Major sponsors of the event included the Oregon chapter of the National Organization for Women (Oregon NOW) and the Greater Portland NOW chapter, PDX Trans Pride, and Planned Parenthood's Columbia Willamette affiliate. The Planned Parenthood chapter had previously elected not to participate when early march leaders failed to incorporate the organization's issues into the event's platform. Oregon Physicians for Social Responsibility also claimed to be a co-sponsor.

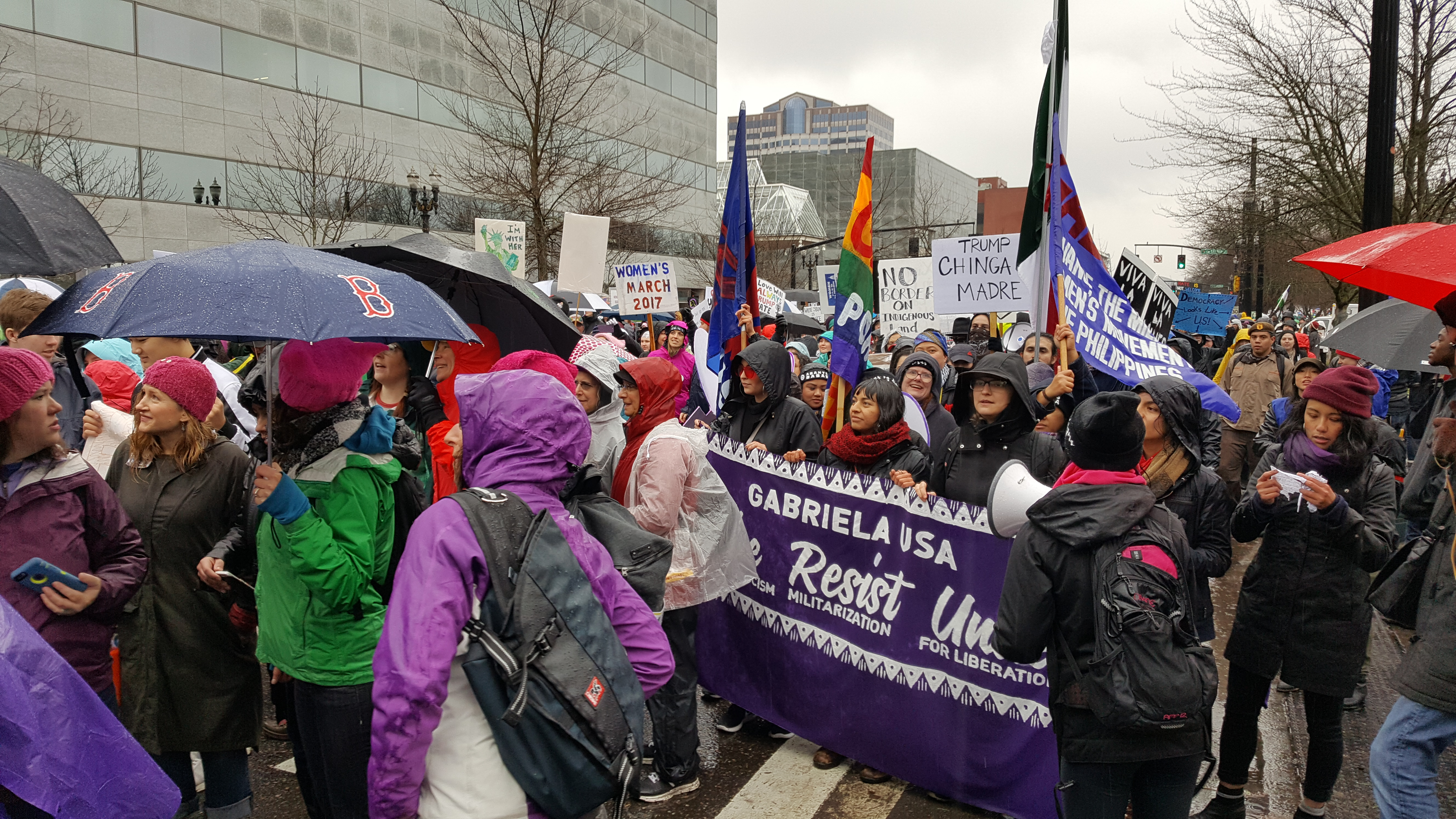
Protestors marching on behalf of GABRIELA USA, the national chapter of the Filipino organization, Gabriela Women's Party

The NAACP of Portland withdrew its support of the protest, accusing the original organizers of failing to discuss discrimination affecting minority groups, specifically immigrants, Muslim women, and women of color. The group's president, Jo Ann Hardesty, said she was told that those issues, along with anti-Trump and Black Lives Matter messaging and signage, were "too political". As a result of the affiliate's criticism, the small group of women from Eastern Oregon who served as the original organizers of the Portland event were replaced with new leaders to "[give] a larger platform to women of color". After the NAACP chapter was made aware of the leadership changes, Hardesty explained: "I felt it was important that we not miss this teachable moment about what role of race and religion and class were playing in pulling this march together." Furthermore, she told Willamette Week: "Putting a black woman's face at the beginning of the march doesn't fundamentally change the reason we withdrew our support. It's always been the case that if somebody suffers a racist incident, you're just supposed to suck it up and then, for the sake of unity, let's all join hands and pretend it didn't happen. I'm just at a place where I don't think that's healthy or wise anymore."

The executive director of the Women's Foundation of Oregon also participated in the march.

=== Funding dispute ===
Following the march, organizers had a dispute over approximately US$22,000 in funds raised via T-shirt sales and direct contributions. Jacobsen said PDX Trans Pride agreed to serve as a fiscal sponsor, and accused the organization of keeping donations intended to support the event as well as future Women's March activities. Brewis insisted "The allegations are absolutely unfounded". There was no written agreement between the two groups. In March 2017, the Oregon Department of Justice confirmed a complaint had been filed; however, the department did not launch a formal investigation until January 2018, and questions started being referred to its criminal division. Reporting on the dispute, The Oregonian also noted that some donations thought to be tax deductions were possibly not because PDX Trans Pride did not have 501(c)(3) status at the time donations were being accepted. The paper also noted that PDX Trans Pride's website had gone dormant.

The funding dispute, along with other disagreements between activist groups, was a main reason no Women's March was held in Portland in 2018.

== See also ==
- Civil liberties in the United States
- Culture of Portland, Oregon
- Feminism in the United States
- List of protests in the United States
