= Women's March on Seattle =

Seattle-based protest

- Part of 2017 Women's March
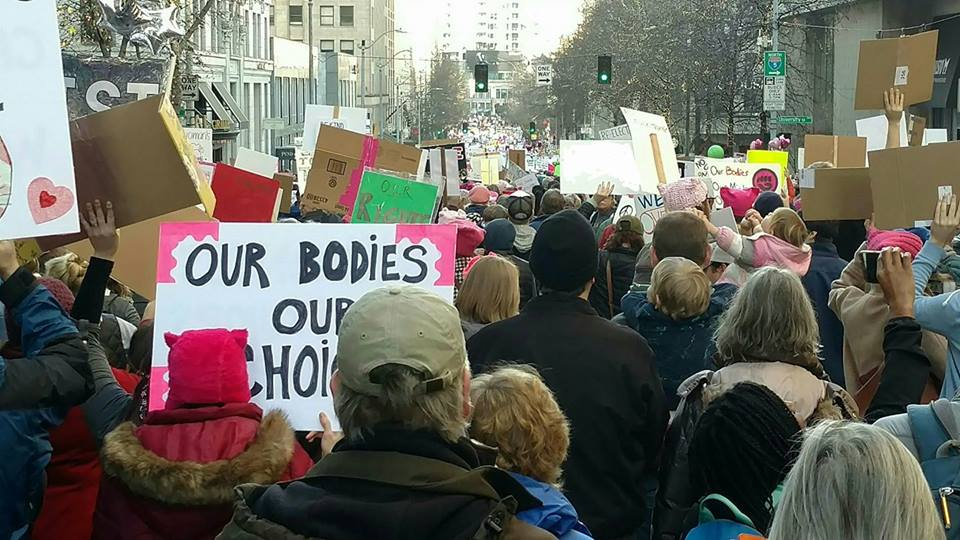
- Date: January 21, 2017
- Location: Seattle, Washington, United States; 47.622°N 122.352°W
- Caused by: Inauguration of Donald Trump
- Methods: Protest march

Number
- 120,000-175,000

The Women's March on Seattle (stylized as the Womxn's March on Seattle) was the Seattle affiliate of the worldwide 2017 Women's March protest on January 21, 2017. Newspapers including The Seattle Times said it was Seattle's largest protest march in history.

The march route was from Seattle's Central District through Westlake Park in Downtown Seattle to the Seattle Center. Drawing an estimated 120,000 to 175,000 marchers according to police and organizers respectively, more than the 1999 Seattle WTO protests, the March filled the entire 3-mile (4.8 km) route through downtown by early afternoon, making vehicle traffic across the route impossible. It was expected to be the third largest protest march in the United States on January 21, after the Women's March on Washington (D.C.) and the march in Los Angeles. An unusual feature of the march is that it was planned to be held in silence.

The event was named using the spelling "womxn"; organizers stated that this naming was meant to symbolize intersectionality with the transgender community.

== Effects ==
Sound Transit and King County Metro rerouted many bus routes and added additional Link light rail service in anticipation of disruption to the city's transportation grid.

The march was routed on South Jackson Street through the Chinatown-International District neighborhood, causing major traffic disruptions. Some businesses in the neighborhood reported large losses in sales, taking place in the lead-up to the Lunar New Year (the largest shopping day of the year in the neighborhood). While restaurants reported good sales, grocery stores that rely on bulk purchases reported losses of up to 65 percent. Prior to the march, business leaders warned that the march would disrupt sales and wrote open letters in the International Examiner asking march participants to return to the neighborhood to offset losses.

== Participation by people outside of Seattle ==
Hundreds of participants came to Seattle in organized groups from Eastside cities including Sammamish and Kirkland by charter bus, the Kitsap Peninsula by Washington State Ferries, and other Washington locales.

=== Other Pacific Northwest marches ===
Other events in Twisp, Spokane, Yakima and Walla Walla in Eastern Washington and numerous cities in Western Washington, as well as Portland, Oregon drew additional thousands of marchers. The event at the state capitol in Olympia had 10,000 attendees. For days, regional knitting shops were sold out of pink yarn used to make pussy hats crafted and worn by the protestors.

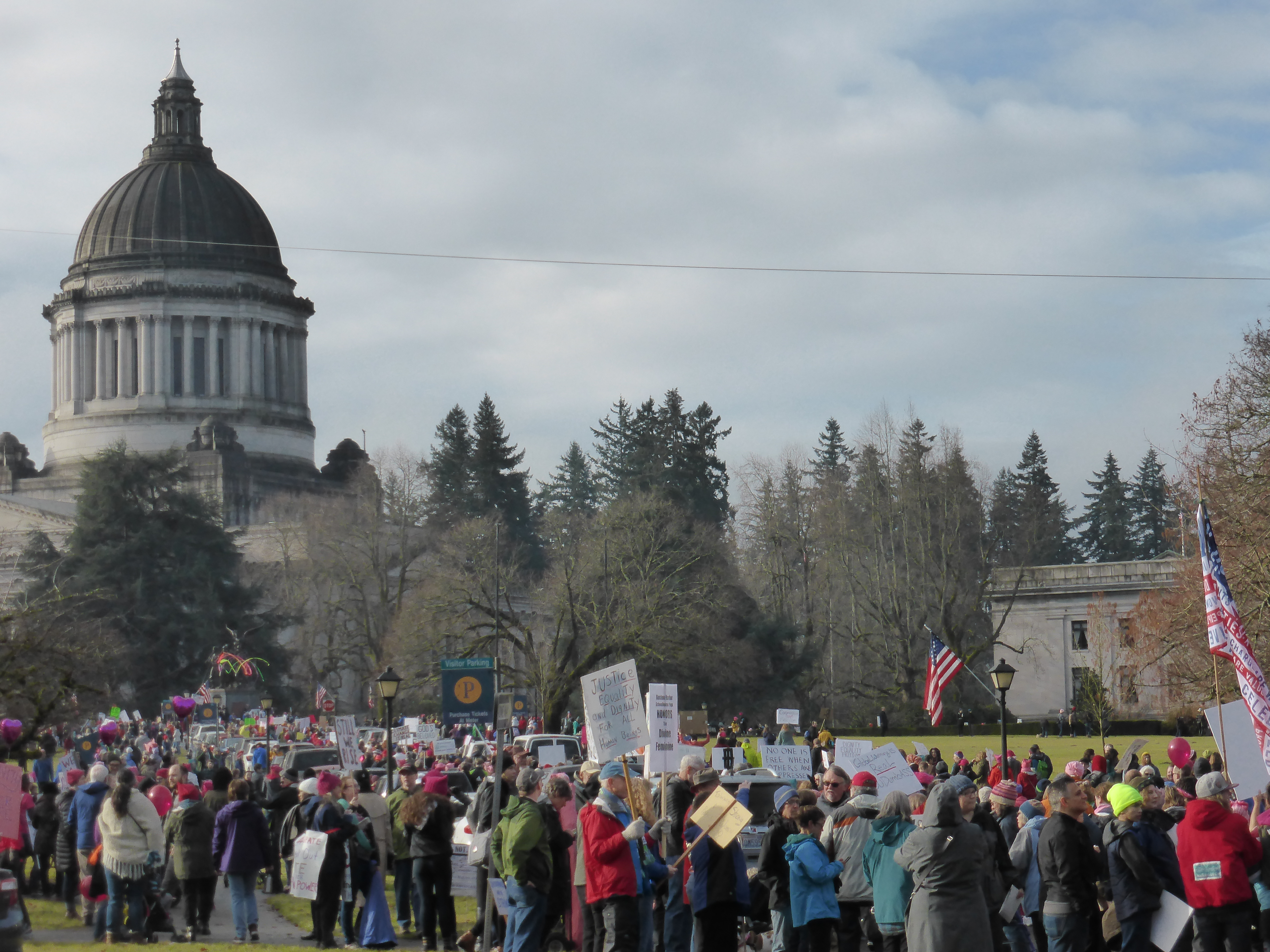
State capitol in Olympia

== Endorsements ==
The Seattle march was endorsed by Washington's senior United States senator, Patty Murray, who said she would be physically present at the D.C. event. The King County AFL–CIO chapter officially participated in the event. The mayor of Seattle, Ed Murray, marched.
