= List of universities and colleges in Shaanxi =

The following is List of Universities and Colleges in Shaanxi.

== National ==
- Xi'an Jiaotong University (西安交通大学) Project 985, Project 211, Double First Class University Plan
- Northwest A&F University (西北农林科技大学) Project 985, Project 211, Double First Class University Plan
- Xidian University (西安电子科技大学) Project 211, Double First Class University Plan
- Shaanxi Normal University (陕西师范大学) Project 211, Double First Class University Plan
- Chang'an University (长安大学) Project 211, Double First Class University Plan

== Ministry of Industry and Information Technology ==
- Northwestern Polytechnical University (西北工业大学) Project 985, Project 211, Double First Class University Plan

== Military ==
- Air Force Engineering University (空军工程大学)
- The Fourth Military Medical University (第四军医大学) Double First Class University Plan
- PLA Rocket Force University of Engineering (解放军火箭军工程大学)
- PLA Xi'an Telecommunication College (解放军西安通信学院)
- PLA Xi'an College of Political Sciences (解放军西安政治学院)

== Provincial ==
Institution	Chinese name	City	Website	Others
Northwest University Ω	西北大学	Xi'an	https://www.nwu.edu.cn/	Project 211, Double First Class University Plan
Northwest University of Politics and Law	西北政法大学	Xi'an	https://www.nwupl.edu.cn/	
Ankang University	安康学院	Ankang	https://www.aku.edu.cn/	
Baoji University of Arts and Sciences	宝鸡文理学院	Baoji	https://www.bjwlxy.edu.cn/	
Shaanxi University of Chinese Medicine	陕西中医药大学	Xianyang	http://www.sntcm.edu.cn/	
Shaanxi University of Science & Technology Ω	陕西科技大学	Xianyang	http://www.sust.edu.cn/	
Shaanxi University of Technology	陕西理工大学	Hanzhong	http://www.snut.edu.cn/	
Shangluo University	商洛学院	Shangluo	http://www.slxy.cn/	
Weinan Normal University	渭南师范学院	Weinan	http://www.wntc.edu.cn/	
Xi'an Academy of Fine Arts	西安美术学院	Xi'an	https://www.xafa.edu.cn/	
Xi'an Conservatory of Music	西安音乐学院	Xi'an	https://web.archive.org/web/20100108020002/http://www.xacom.edu.cn/	
Xi'an Institute of Arts and Science	西安文理学院	Xi'an	https://www.xawl.org/	
Xi'an International Studies University	西安外国语大学	Xi'an	https://www.xisu.edu.cn/	
Xi'an Medical University	西安医学院	Xi'an	https://www.xiyi.edu.cn/	
Xi'an Physical Education University	西安体育学院	Xi'an	https://www.xaipe.edu.cn/	
Xi'an Polytechnic University	西安工程大学	Xi'an	https://web.archive.org/web/20100302011242/http://www.xaist.edu.cn/	
Xi'an Shiyou University	西安石油大学	Xi'an	http://www.xapi.edu.cn/	
Xi'an Technological University	西安工业大学	Xi'an	https://www.xatu.edu.cn	
Xi'an University of Architecture and Technology	西安建筑科技大学	Xi'an	https://www.xauat.edu.cn/	
Xi'an University of Finance and Economics	西安财经学院	Xi'an	https://www.xaufe.edu.cn/	
Xi'an University of Posts & Telecommunications	西安邮电大学	Xi'an	https://www.xiyou.edu.cn/	
Xi'an University of Science and Technology	西安科技大学	Xi'an	https://www.xust.edu.cn/	
Xi'an University of Technology	西安理工大学	Xi'an	https://www.xaut.edu.cn/	
Xianyang Normal University	咸阳师范学院	Xianyang	http://www.xysfxy.cn/	
Yan'an University	延安大学	Yan'an	https://www.yau.edu.cn/	
Yulin University	榆林学院	Yulin	http://www.yulinu.edu.cn/	
Shaanxi Railway Institute	陝西鐵路工程職業技術學院	Weinan	http://www.sxri.net/	

== Private ==
Note: Institutions without full-time bachelor programs are not listed.

Institution	Chinese name	City	Website
Xi'an Eurasia University	西安欧亚学院	Xi'an	https://www.eurasia.edu/
Xi'an Fanyi University	西安翻译学院	Xi'an	https://web.archive.org/web/20101207013048/http://www.xfuedu.org/
Xi'an International University	西安外事学院	Xi'an	https://www.xaiu.edu.cn/
Xijing University	西京学院	Xi'an	http://www.xijing.com.cn/
Xi'an Peihua University	西安培华学院	Xi'an	https://www.peihua.cn/
Xi'an Siyuan University	西安思源学院	Xi'an	https://web.archive.org/web/20061114114555/http://www.xasyu.cn/
