= Michael Meadows (professor) =

South African Professor of physical geography (1955-)

Professor Michael Meadows FAAS FRSSAf
- Born: Michael Edward Meadows; 25 July 1955 (age 70); Liverpool, UK
- Citizenship: South Africa; UK
- Education: University of Sussex (BSc); University of Cambridge (PhD)
- Scientific career
- Fields: Physical Geography; Palaeoecology; Quaternary environmental change Geomorphology; Land degradation Anthropocene studies
- Institutions: University of Cape Town; Rhodes University; Liverpool John Moores University; International Geographical Union

Michael Edward Meadows FAAS FRSSAf (born 25 July 1955 in Liverpool) is a British-South African Emeritus Professor of physical geography at the Department of Environmental and Geographical Sciences, University of Cape Town.

== Early life and education ==
Michael Edward Meadows was born on 25 July 1955 in Liverpool, UK. He attended the University of Sussex between 1973 and 1976. He graduated with a Bachelor of Science in Geography and Biological Science, before obtaining a Doctor of Philosophy from the Department of Geography, University of Cambridge in 1979.

== Career and research ==
After his PhD, Meadows joined Liverpool John Moores University (1979–1983) before moving to Rhodes University, South Africa, from 1983 until 1986, when he since joined the University of Cape Town and became a professor in 2003. Since 2019, he has been an emeritus professor at the University of Cape Town. He is a visiting professor at Nanjing University, China, after being awarded a fellowship by the Geographical Research and Natural Resources Research of the Chinese Academy of Sciences in 2021. Meadows is a distinguished professor at East China Normal University, Jian Feng Professor at Zhejiang Normal University, visiting professor at Beijing Normal University and Yulin University.

Meadows was the head of the Department of Environmental and Geographical Sciences (2001–2017) and chair of the Science Faculty Ethics Committee and the University Sports Council. He has been the president of the International Geographical Union since 2021 and served before as Secretaries-General and Treasurer from 2010.

Meadows research focuses on physical geography, namely geomorphological and biogeographical effects of both natural and human-caused climate change, as well as Quaternary environmental change, land degradation and desertification, and Palaeoecology. He has used a variety of proxies, including pollen, diatoms, biomarkers, stable isotope geochemistry, sedimentology, and evidence from lakes, wetlands, and, more atypically, accumulations of faecal and urine material deposited by Hyrax capensis, in his reconstructions of past southern African environments. He is a member of the Academia Europaea, Royal Geographical Society, Royal Society of South Africa, African Academy of Sciences, Society of South African Geographers and Southern African Quaternary Association. He is on the editorial board of Natural Hazards (Springer Nature).

== Awards and honours ==
Meadows was elected a Fellow of the Society of South African Geographers and Southern African Quaternary Association in 2000, a Fellow of the Royal Geographical Society in 2016, a Fellow of the Royal Society of South Africa in 2015, a Fellow of the University of Cape Town since 2016, and a Fellow of the African Academy of Sciences in 2018.

== Selected publications ==
- Chase, Brian M.; Meadows, Michael E. (2007–10). Late Quaternary dynamics of southern Africa's winter rainfall zone. Earth-Science Reviews. 84 (3–4): 103–138. doi:10.1016/j.earscirev.2007.06.002.
- Chase, B.M.; Meadows, M.E.; Scott, L.; Thomas, D.S.G.; Marais, E.; Sealy, J.; Reimer, P.J. (2009–08). A record of rapid Holocene climate change preserved in hyrax middens from southwestern Africa. Geology. 37 (8): 703–706. doi:10.1130/G30053A.1. ISSN 0091-7613.
- Chase, Brian M.; Meadows, Michael E.; Carr, Andrew S.; Reimer, Paula J. (2010–07). Evidence for progressive Holocene aridification in southern Africa recorded in Namibian hyrax middens: Implications for African Monsoon dynamics and the African Humid Period. Quaternary Research. 74 (1): 36–45. doi:10.1016/j.yqres.2010.04.006. ISSN 0033-5894.
- Truc, Loïc; Chevalier, Manuel; Favier, Charly; Cheddadi, Rachid; Meadows, Michael E.; Scott, Louis; Carr, Andrew S.; Smith, Gideon F.; Chase, Brian M. (2013–09). Quantification of climate change for the last 20,000years from Wonderkrater, South Africa: Implications for the long-term dynamics of the Intertropical Convergence Zone. Palaeogeography, Palaeoclimatology, Palaeoecology. 386: 575–587. doi:10.1016/j.palaeo.2013.06.024.
- Carr, Andrew S.; Boom, Arnoud; Grimes, Hannah L.; Chase, Brian M.; Meadows, Michael E.; Harris, Angela (2014-02-01). Leaf wax n-alkane distributions in arid zone South African flora: Environmental controls, chemotaxonomy and palaeoecological implications. Organic Geochemistry. 67: 72–84. doi:10.1016/j.orggeochem.2013.12.004.
- Meadows, M. E.; Linder, H. P. (1993-07-01). Special Paper: A Palaeoecological Perspective on the Origin of Afromontane Grasslands. Journal of Biogeography. 20 (4): 345. doi:10.2307/2845584.
