= Harold St. John Loyd Winterbotham =

British soldier and surveyor (1879–1946)

Brigadier Harold St. John Loyd Winterbotham CB CMG DSO ADC
- Honours: Companion of the Distinguished Service Order (1916); Companion of the Order of St Michael and St George (1918); Aide-de-Camp (1931); Companion of the Order of the Bath (1935)

Harold St. John Loyd Winterbotham CB CMG DSO ADC (5 February 1879 – 10 December 1946) was a British soldier and surveyor who from 1930 to 1934 was Director of the Ordnance Survey.

== Biography ==
Born in Northampton and educated at Fettes College as well as the Royal Military Academy, Winterbotham was commissioned in the Royal Engineers in 1897. He fought in the South African War, and his service there was recognized by a Queen's South Africa Medal with three clasps. After the war, Winterbotham served as garrison adjutant in Saint Helena, later returning to South Africa in 1908 to carry out a topographical survey until 1911. He joined the Ordnance Survey out of Southampton in 1911, being in charge of the Trigonometrical and Topographical Division.

When World War I broke out in 1914, he left for France to serve as commander of a unit. During the war, it is remembered that he was nicknamed "The Astrologer" because he could pinpoint far-away targets with guns. For his service in the war, he was honored as both a Companion of the Distinguished Service Order and a Companion of the Order of St Michael & St George, as well as receiving a brevet of lieutenant-colonel.

In 1920, Winterbotham returned to the same division of the Ordnance Survey, and from 1922 to 1929 was chief of the Geographical Section, General Staff. One year after his appointment to the directorship of the Ordnance Survey in 1930, he became an Aide-de-Camp to the King. From the 1930 general assembly until 1935, he served as Secretary General of the International Union of Geodesy and Geophysics.

Winterbotham retired from both the Ordnance Survey and the Army in 1935; he was placed on retirement pay 5 February, and was granted the honorary title of Brigadier. In 1939, George Washington University awarded him an honorary Doctor of Science degree.

Winterbotham died in his Sutton Courtenay home on 10 December 1946, aged 68.

During both of their lifetimes, Winterbotham and Charles Close were close geographical collaborators.

== Awards ==
- Distinguished Service Medal (1919)
- Victoria Medal (1920)
