= Kazimierz Dziewoński =

Polish geographer

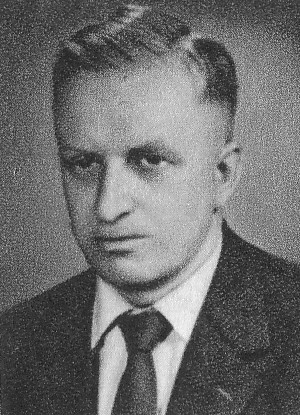

Kazimierz Dziewoński (10 July 1910 in Ivanovo – 4 November 1994 near Warsaw) was a human geographer.

Professor at the Polish Academy of Sciences since 1954. President of the Commission for Methods of Economic Regionalization of the International Geographical Union in 1960-1964. Honorary member of numerous learned societies. His research focuses on cities, localization and methodology.
