= Directors of the Ordnance Survey =

The following is a list of those in charge of the Ordnance Survey of Great Britain from its inauguration in 1791 to present. The title of the post was originally Superintendent of the Ordnance Survey (under the Board of Ordnance) but it evolved during the tenure of Henry James. He was appointed in 1854 as Superintendent but he had made himself Director by 1863 and then Director-General by 1874. More recently, between 1985 and 1991, the title became Director-General and Chief Executive.

| 1791–1798 | Colonel Edward Williams |
| 1798–1820 | Major General William Mudge |
| 1820–1847 | Major General Thomas Frederick Colby |
| 1847–1854 | Colonel Lewis Alexander Hall |
| 1854–1875 | Lieutenant General Sir Henry James |
| 1875–1878 | Lieutenant General John Cameron |
| 1878 | Colonel Alexander Ross Clarke |
| 1878–1883 | Major General Anthony C. Cooke |
| 1883–1886 | Colonel Richard H. Stotherd |
| 1886–1894 | Colonel Sir Charles William Wilson |
| 1894–1899 | Colonel John Farquharson |
| 1899–1905 | Colonel Sir Duncan A. Johnston |
| 1905–1908 | Colonel R.C. Hellard |
| 1908–1911 | Colonel Samuel Charles Norton Grant |
| 1911–1922 | Colonel Sir Charles Frederick Close |
| 1922–1930 | Brigadier Evan MacLean Jack |
| 1930–1934 | Brigadier Harold St John Loyd Winterbotham |
| 1935–1943 | Major-General Malcolm Neynoe MacLeod |
| 1943–1949 | Major-General Geoffrey Cheetham |
| 1949–1953 | Major–General Reginald Llewelyn Brown |
| 1953–1957 | Major-General John Christopher Temple Willis |
| 1957–1961 | Major-General L.F. de Vic Carey |
| 1961–1965 | Major-General Arthur Henley Dowson |
| 1965–1969 | Major-General R.C.A. Edge |
| 1969–1977 | Major-General Brian St-G. Irwin |
| 1977–1985 | Walter P. Smith |
| 1985–1991 | Peter McMaster |
| 1992–1998 | Professor David Rhind |
| 1998–1999 | Geoffrey Robinson |
| 1999–2000 | David Willey |
| 2000–2014 | Vanessa Lawrence |
| 2014–2015 | Neil Ackroyd |
| 2015–2018 | Nigel Clifford |
| 2018–2019 | Neil Ackroyd |
| 2019–2021 | Steve Blair |
| 2021–2023 | Stephen Lake |
| 2023– | Nick Bolton |

== See also ==
Ordnance Survey
