= Annette Summers Engel =

American earth scientist

- Education: University of Cincinnati; Wittenberg University; University of Texas at Austin
- Scientific career
- Workplaces: Louisiana State University; University of Tennessee
- Thesis: Geomicrobiology of sulfuric acid speleogenesis : microbial diversity, nutrient cycling, and controls on cave formation (2004)

Annette Summers Engel is an American earth scientist who has served as the Inaugural Executive Director of the National Speleological Society since August 2025. From August 2011 to July 2025, she was the Donald and Florence Jones Professor of Aqueous Geochemistry at the University of Tennessee. Her research considers how microbes and invertebrates interact with rocks and minerals in groundwater, rivers, estuaries, and other environments. She was elected Fellow of the American Association for the Advancement of Science in 2019.

== Early life and education ==
Engel is from Ohio. Whilst at summer camp at Carter Caves State Resort Park, Engel realised she wanted to be a geologist. She met Horton H. Hobbs Jr., a member of the Wittenberg University Speleological Society. She eventually became an undergraduate student in geology at the Wittenberg University, where she spent her weekends doing field work. During one of her adventures she became aware of the Movile Cave ecosystems, and was eventually offered a position on the research team in Romania. She stayed in Ohio for her graduate studies, and completed her Master's dissertation on the Movile Cave at the University of Cincinnati. She remained at the University of Cincinnati for a second master's degree, focusing on biology. Alongside her work on the Movile Cave, Engel studied the Frasassi Caves. She was a doctoral researcher at the University of Texas at Austin, where she studied geochemistry and geomicrobiology. Her doctoral research focused on the Lower Kane Cave in Wyoming. She identified a novel group of sulphur bacteria, which were closely related to bacteria found in deep sea hydrothermal vents. She was the first to identify that microorganisms were involved with sulfuric acid speleogenesis.

== Research and career ==
Engel investigates how microbes interact with rocks and minerals. She joined the faculty at Louisiana State University in 2004. Her early research involved the Edwards Aquifer, as well as research into the microbial diversity of salt marshes. Alongside caves, Engel worked on coastal systems, particularly focusing on how ecosystems were impacted by the Deepwater Horizon oil spill.

In 2011, Engel moved to the University of Tennessee. She was appointed the Donald and Florence Jones Professor of Aqueous Geochemistry in 2016. She has investigated the biological diversity of lava tubes in Hawaii. In addition, she studied lucinid bivalves from coastal biomes, and how changes in the coastal biome will impact lucinid chemosymbiotic associations. She was elected President of the International Society for Environmental Biogeochemistry in 2020.

In 2025, Engel transitioned from a faculty member at University of Tennessee to the Inaugural Executive Director of the National Speleological Society. She maintains an adjunct affiliation at the University of Tennessee and continues some research.

== Awards and honors ==
- 1996 National Speleological Society James G. Mitchell award
- 1997 Charles A. and Anne Morrow Lindbergh Foundation award
- 2003 Elected Fellow of the National Speleological Society
- 2012 Elected Fellow of the Geological Society of America
- 2014 National Speleological Society Science Award
- 2015 Elected Fellow of The Explorers Club
- 2019 Elected Fellow of the American Association for the Advancement of Science
- 2021 Karst Waters Institute Karst Award

== Selected publications ==
- Barbara J Campbell; Annette Summers Engel; Megan L Porter; Ken Takai (1 June 2006). "The versatile epsilon-proteobacteria: key players in sulphidic habitats". Nature Reviews Microbiology. 4 (6): 458–468. doi:10.1038/nrmicro1414. ISSN 1740-1534. PMID 16652138. Wikidata Q33241702.
- Justin E. Birdwell; Annette Summers Engel (March 2010). "Characterization of dissolved organic matter in cave and spring waters using UV–Vis absorbance and fluorescence spectroscopy". Organic Geochemistry. 41 (3): 270–280. doi:10.1016/j.orggeochem.2009.11.002. ISSN 0146-6380. Wikidata Q57867064.
- Annette Summers Engel; Philip C. Bennett (2004). "Microbial contributions to cave formation: New insights into sulfuric acid speleogenesis". Geology. 32 (5): 369. Bibcode:2004Geo....32..369S. doi:10.1130/g20288.1. ISSN 0091-7613. Wikidata Q58874739.
