= Alexander Ross Clarke =

British geodesist (1828–1914)

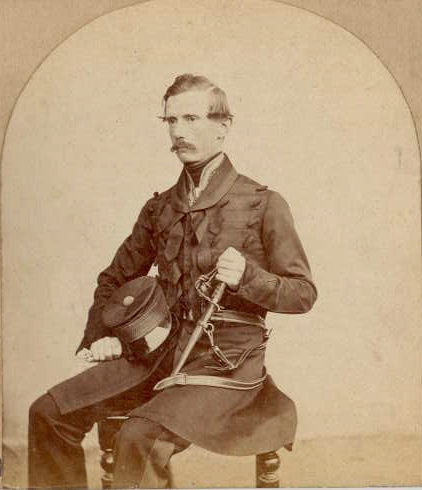
- Alexander Ross Clarke in 1861
- Born: 16 December 1828; Reading, England
- Died: 11 February 1914 (aged 85); Reigate, England
- Known for: The Principal Triangulation of Great Britain, Reference ellipsoids, Textbook on geodesy.
- Awards: Royal Medal of the Royal Society, Companion of the Order of the Bath
- Scientific career
- Fields: Geodesy
- Workplaces: Ordnance Survey

Alexander Ross Clarke FRS FRSE (1828–1914) was a British geodesist, primarily remembered for his calculation of the Principal Triangulation of Britain (1858), the calculation of the Figure of the Earth (1858, 1860, 1866, 1880) and one of the most important text books of Geodesy (1880). He was a military officer of the Royal Engineers employed on the Ordnance Survey, attaining the rank of colonel.

== Biographical details ==
=== Sources ===
The basic sources of material on Clarke are the two articles by Charles Close, one of the Directors of the Ordnance Survey. The first was an article for the Royal Engineers Journal (Close 1925) and the second, a revised and expanded version, appeared in the Empire Survey Review(Close 1943). Although Close was almost thirty years younger than Clarke, and joined the Ordnance Survey only after Clarke's retirement, they knew each other well and they collaborated on the article Map for the eleventh edition of Encyclopædia Britannica. Much of Close's material is incorporated in the web page REubique (de Santis 2002) along with details of his military career and further information communicated by one of Clarke's living descendants. Other sources of information are to be found in the Times of London and obituaries in several learned societies. Two recent histories of the Ordnance Survey include information on Clarke: Owen and Pilbeam, and Seymour.

=== Family background and education 1828–1850 ===
Clarke was born in Reading, Berkshire, England on 16 December 1828. His Scottish father, David Ross Clarke, had travelled to Jamaica as a young merchant and there he married Elizabeth (Eliza) Ann Hall, the daughter of Colonel Charles William Hall and Isabella Ann Ford, on 8 March 1827 in Kingston. They came to England for the birth of Alexander but they must have returned to Jamaica very soon afterwards for Alexander would later regale his own children with stories of his childhood experiences in the colony.(Close1925)

The parents, David and Eliza, were back in England by 1834 but they soon moved up to David's family home at Eriboll in the far north of Scotland. The school teaching there was primitive but effective. Close (1943) repeats an anecdote told by Alexander's younger brother: "I do not know what schooling he had in those young days, but I remember his telling me of a dominie putting him under his desk and kicking him from time to time, also how taws were used. Anyway he learned Latin and mathematics." Close adds that "The mathematics that was thus kicked into him determined his career in after life."

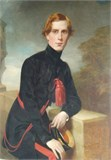
Clarke at 22

David Clarke and his family moved to London, before 1846, and eventually settled at 35 Devonshire Place, where he died in 1861. His wife, Eliza Ann, died in 1887. It was from this London address that Alexander Clarke, at the age of seventeen in 1846, applied to the Royal Military Academy, Woolwich as a Gentleman Cadet. Clarke was very unprepared for the entrance examination, having left a space of only three weeks for revision, and he was placed bottom of the list of candidates. At Woolwich he would undergo basic military training and formal teaching in subjects such as mathematics and engineering. Clarke excelled at his studies and he passed out first, with "the reputation of being an exceptionally capable young man" (Close 1943). He was commissioned as a second lieutenant in the Royal Engineers on 1 October 1847.

After his commissioning, Clarke attended the Young Officers Course at the Royal School of Military Engineering at Chatham and there he would have studied surveying as well as military engineering. He was promoted to the rank of Lieutenant on 11 July 1849 at the end of that course.

=== Ordnance Survey 1850–1881 ===
In 1849, during the last months of his time at Chatham, Clarke decided to try for the Ordnance Survey and he made an indirect approach to the Superintendent, Colonel Hall, through the good offices of Colonel Reid, his former professor at the Royal Military Academy (Close 1925). Hall had no funds to employ Clarke that year but he recruited him the following year when the government approved funding for the preparation of the final report on the Principal Triangulation of Great Britain. This was an opportune moment, for the Survey had recently lost some of its senior staff and, at the same time, Hall had banished Captain William Yolland, the most able member of the Survey, to its remotest office in Enniskillen.

Before Clarke could make progress on the calculation of the triangulation, the War Office intervened and abruptly dispatched him to military service in Canada. The nature of the posting is not recorded but it had one happy outcome. Clarke met, and married, Frances Maria, youngest daughter of Colonel Matthew C. Dixon, his commanding officer.

Superintendent Hall retired in 1854 and Yolland, the most competent member of the Survey, was passed over in favour of Colonel Henry James. Yolland resigned immediately and Clarke was the only qualified candidate for the analysis of the triangulation. (James was not a mathematician.) The magnitude of this task is discussed below. The report was accomplished by 1858, an exceedingly short period of time. His endeavour was rewarded by his military promotion to 2nd Captain in 1855 and by being appointed head of the Trigonometrical and Levelling Departments of the Ordnance Survey in 1856.

Clarke worked intensely on a number of major projects (below) during the 27 years to 1881, all of which were described in voluminous reports. Clarke appears to have got on well enough with Superintendent James despite James's habit of having his name well to the forefront on these reports. The total experience of these years was distilled in Clarke's famous textbook, Geodesy.

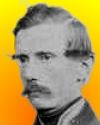

Clarke's contribution to the Survey greatly enhanced its reputation. He himself was acknowledged as one of greatest geodesists in the world and he was honoured with fellowships at the Royal Society of London (1862) and the Philosophical Society of Cambridge (1871). He was also elected a Corresponding Member of the Russian Imperial Academy of Sciences (1868). He was made a Companion of the Most Honourable Order of the Bath in 1870. His army promotions were to Captain (1861), Major of Army Rank (1871), Major of Regimental Rank (1872), Lieutenant Colonel (1872) and Colonel (1877). (See de Santis 2002).

The Clarke family lived in Southampton from 1854 to 1881, the last twenty years in a fashionable Georgian property at 21, Carlton Crescent. The family was large, nine daughters, and four boys, one of whom died young. During the time of intense activity with the Survey, Clarke preferred to work at home with this large family around him. (Close 1925). Two of the girls and the three boys married. One son, Eric Manley Clarke, later was the first teacher in mathematics at the Lincoln Agricultural College (now Lincoln University) in Lincoln, New Zealand.

=== Retirement and legacy 1881–1914 ===
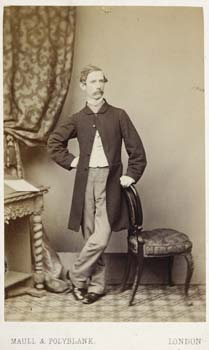

Superintendent James retired in 1875 and he was succeeded by his deputy, Colonel John Cameron. He died suddenly in 1878 and after his death Clarke was made acting head of the Survey until the appointment of Colonel Anthony C. Cooke. It was surprising that Clarke himself was not appointed. Three years later the War Office intervened in his career once again; "an official of a well-known type woke up to the fact that he had been at a home station (i.e. the Survey at Southampton) for twenty-seven years, and he was ordered to go to Mauritius" (Close 1943). Clarke, a man of some-what hasty temper (Close), strongly resented this summary order which involved such a complete break with his life's work and he promptly sent in his resignation from the Army. Despite protestations to the War Office from the scientific establishment, Clarke's resignation was allowed to stand. "Clarke's retirement was a veritable disaster for the Survey, and his departure lowered the whole tone and scientific status of the department for many a long year." (Close 1925).

From 1881 Clarke's involvement with geodesy becomes more and more tenuous. In October 1883 he and Airy were the British delegates at the International Geodetic Conference in Rome, and in 1884 he represented Britain at the International Meridian Conference. Thereafter he published no further work on the subject apart from his revision, with Helmert, of his Encyclopædia Britannica articles. His fame was not diminished in any way: he was made an honorary Fellow of both the Royal Society of Edinburgh (1892) and the Royal Astronomical Society. His most prestigious award was the Royal Medal of the Royal Society of London in 1887. The text of the citation is as follows:

"The medal which, in accordance with the usual rule has been devoted to mathematics and physics, has this year been awarded to Colonel A. Clarke for his comparison of standards of length, and determination of the figure of the earth. Col. Clarke was for some 25 years the scientific and mathematical adviser for the Ordnance Survey, and while acting in that capacity he became known to the whole scientific world as possessing unique knowledge and power in dealing with the complex questions which arise in the science of geodesy. His laborious comparison of the standards of length, carried out under General Sir Henry James, R.E., are universally regarded as models of scientific precision. His determination of the ellipticity and dimensions of the earth from the great arcs of meridian and longitude involved a very high mathematical ability and an enormous amount of labour. The conclusion at which he arrived removed an apparent discrepancy between the results of pendulum experiments and those derived from geodesy, and is generally accepted as the best approximation hitherto attained as to the figure of the earth."

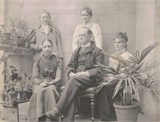
Clarke with daughters

On retirement Clarke moved to Reigate with his wife and several unmarried daughters. His wife died in 1888. With only his army pension to support the family he was in straitened circumstances and he was forced to cancel his subscriptions to London clubs and the learned societies. These included his membership of the Royal Society but, in 1888, he was honoured by re-admission without fees. His son recounts that he even sold his Royal Medal, for forty pounds, but gave half away to charity. Although Clarke disengaged from the study of geodesy he was clearly mentally active until a very good age. The accounts by Close mention microscopy, the four colour problem, music and, above all, religion.

Alexander Ross Clarke died on 11 February 1914 in Reigate. There is a brief obituary in the Times (1914) but the Royal Society obituary and the Nature obituary are more comprehensive. For many years he was the most prominent geodesist in Britain.

== Major geodetic contributions ==
=== Principal Triangulation, 1858 ===
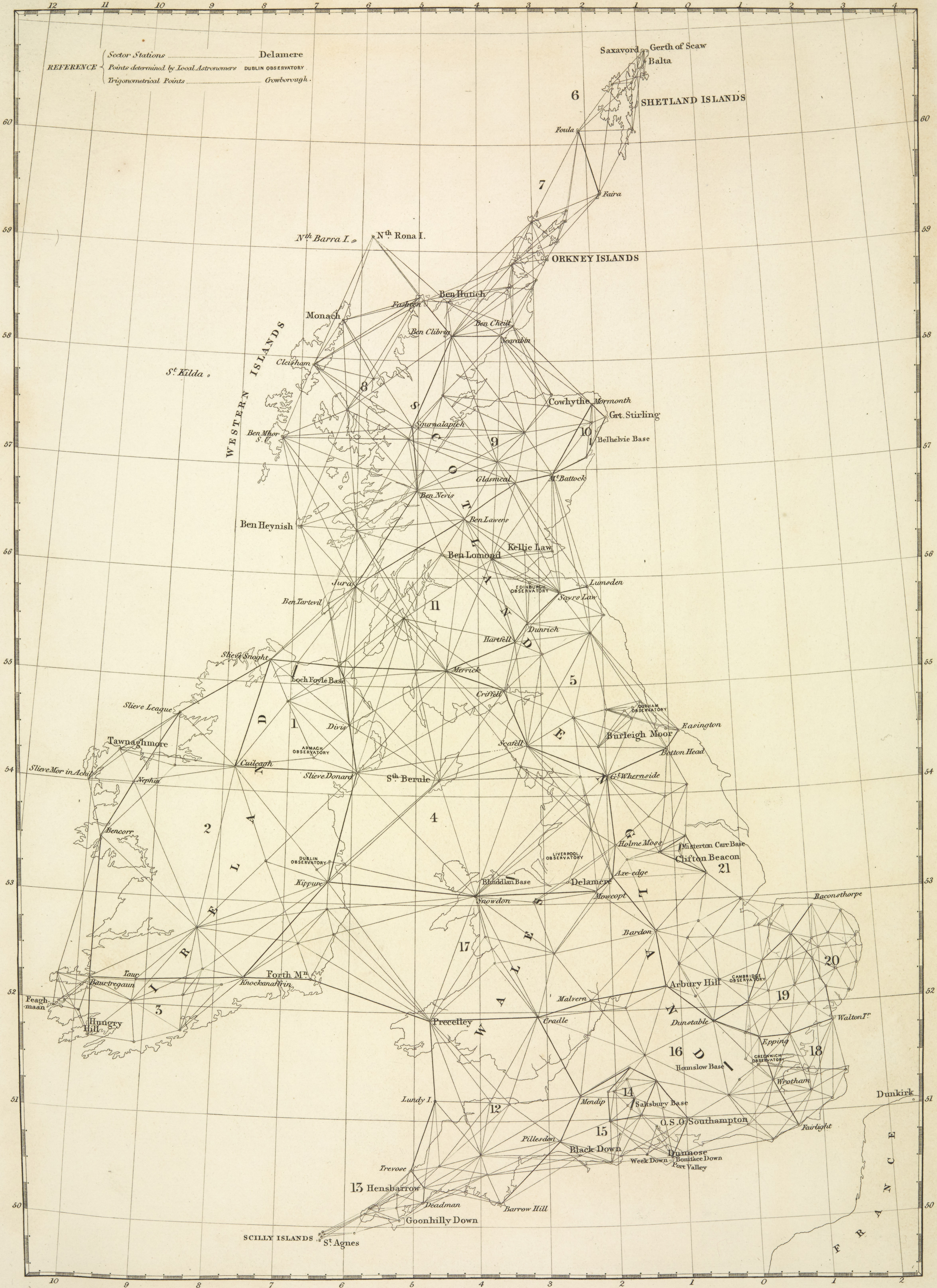
The principal triangulation mesh over Britain, 1860.

The Principal Triangulation of Great Britain was initiated by the Board of Ordnance in 1791 and carried out under the direction of William Mudge and Thomas Frederick Colby. The field work was completed in 1853, just as Clarke joined the Board. The methods of analysis had been planned in outline by William Yolland, his predecessor at the head of the Trigonometric Section, but it fell to Clarke to finalize the methods and carry them through to completion. This he achieved in the four years from 1854 to 1858: the report was published as Clarke & James (1858b) but it is entirely Clarke's work. The basic data was the collection of angle bearings taken from each of the 289 stations towards a number of other stations, typically from three to ten in number. The multiple observations were first subjected to a least squares error analysis to extract the most likely angles and then the triangles formed by the corrected bearings were adjusted simultaneously, again by least squares methods, to find the most likely geometry for the whole mesh. This was an immense undertaking which involved the solution of 920 equations without the aid of matrix methods or digital computers. The only available computers were the living personnel of the Trigonometric Section, twenty one of them. Once the triangles had been fixed it was then possible to calculate all the sides of the mesh in terms of the length of either of the bases, one by Lough Foyle in Ireland and the other on Salisbury plain. The accuracy of the survey was such that when the length of the Lough Foyle base was calculated through the triangulation mesh from the Salisbury base the error was only 5 inches when compared with its measured length (of 41,640.887 feet or about 8 miles). The final step was to use the distances and angles to work out the latitude and longitude of each triangulation point on the Airy ellipsoid.

The natural course of events after a primary triangulation is to construct a secondary triangulation with sides of a few miles, and then a tertiary triangulation at a parish level to show all significant details. Unfortunately this did not happen because the infilling had been going on for fifty years of topographic surveying, with maps already published on a county basis. Some of those maps had origins that were connected to the primary triangulation, and some did not. As a result, the county maps were only loosely tied to the principal triangulation and no attempt was made to revise them.

=== Figure of the Earth, 1858 ===
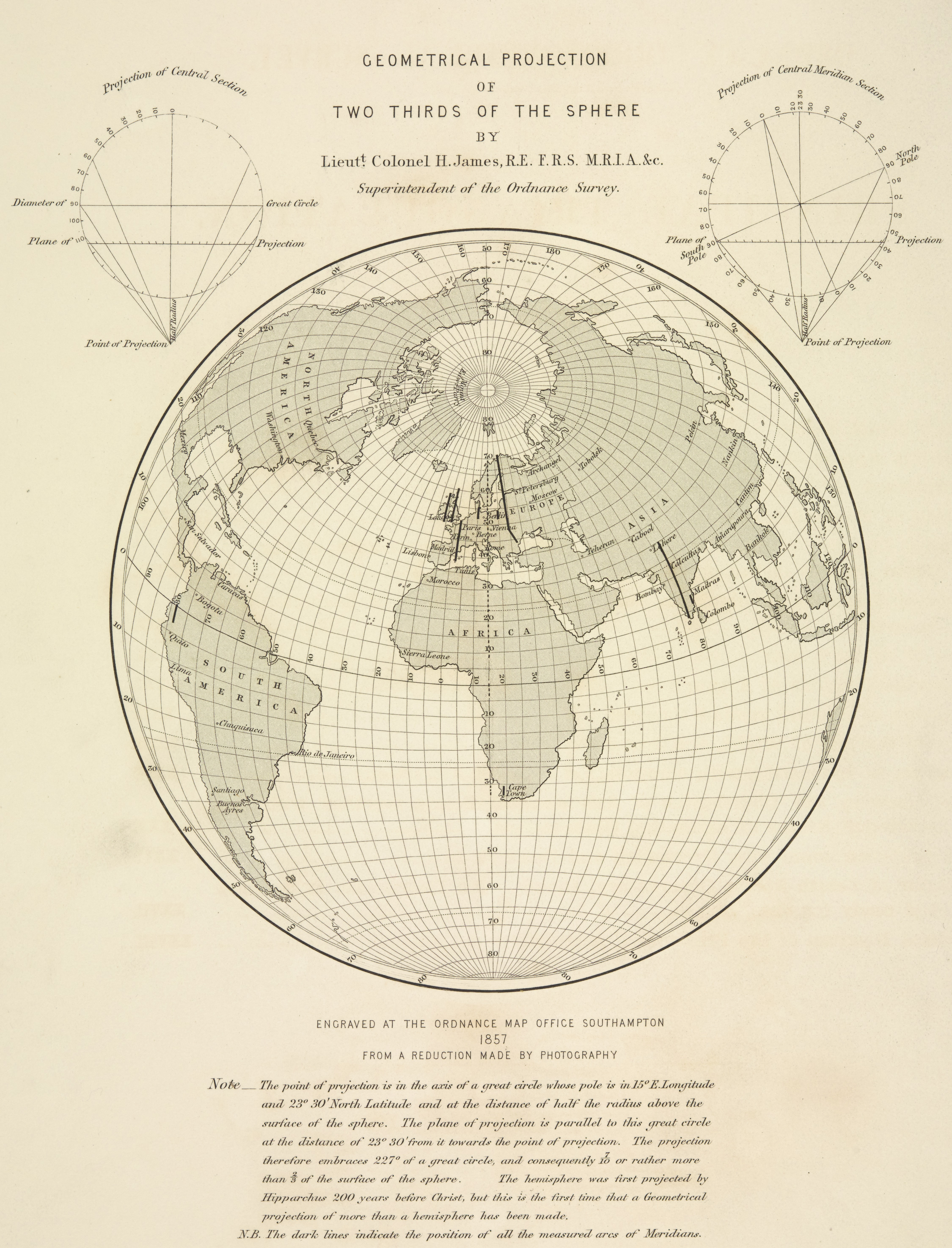
A perspective projection showing the meridian arcs used in computing the figure of the Earth, 1860.

The latitudes and longitudes of the triangulation were calculated on the Airy ellipsoid for which the semimajor axis (a) and inverse flattening (c=1/f with f=1-b/a) are

- a=20923713 ft., c=280.4. (Airy 1830)

In the penultimate section of the Principal Triangulation Clarke compared the calculated latitudes with the actual observed values and he adjusted the ellipsoid parameters so that the differences were minimized in a least squares fit. The result was

- a=20927005 ft., c=299.33. (Best fitting ellipsoid for GB, 1858)

These values were of academic value only since Britain continued to define latitude and longitude on the Airy ellipsoid or, after 1936, a slightly modified version.

In the final section of the report Clarke combined the British data with that for the meridian arcs of France, Russia, India, Prussia, Peru, Hanover and Denmark. The result was

- a=20926348 ft., c=294.26. (Clarke 1858.)
- a=6378350.87 m., c=294.26, (Clarke 1858.)

=== Triaxial Figure of the Earth, 1860 ===
In Clarke (1861) he notes that General T. F. de Schubert had published a paper in which he claimed that the meridian arc data established that the equator of the Earth was elliptical in form. Clarke was prompted to analyze a larger data set from which he deduced that if the Earth was indeed a tri-axial ellipsoid with a polar semi-axis (c) and semi-axes a (maximum) and b (minimum) in the equatorial plane, then

- c=20853768 ft., a=20926485 ft., at 13°58′30″E b=20921177 ft., at 103°58′30″E

so that the inverse flattening varied between 309.4 and 286.8. (The difference in the equatorial semi-axes is approximately one mile.) However, Clarke estimated the errors of the results and found that the error in longitudes could be as much as 20°. Therefore, he maintained that the data were not accurate enough to justify a tri-axial model.

=== Levelling of Great Britain, 1861 ===
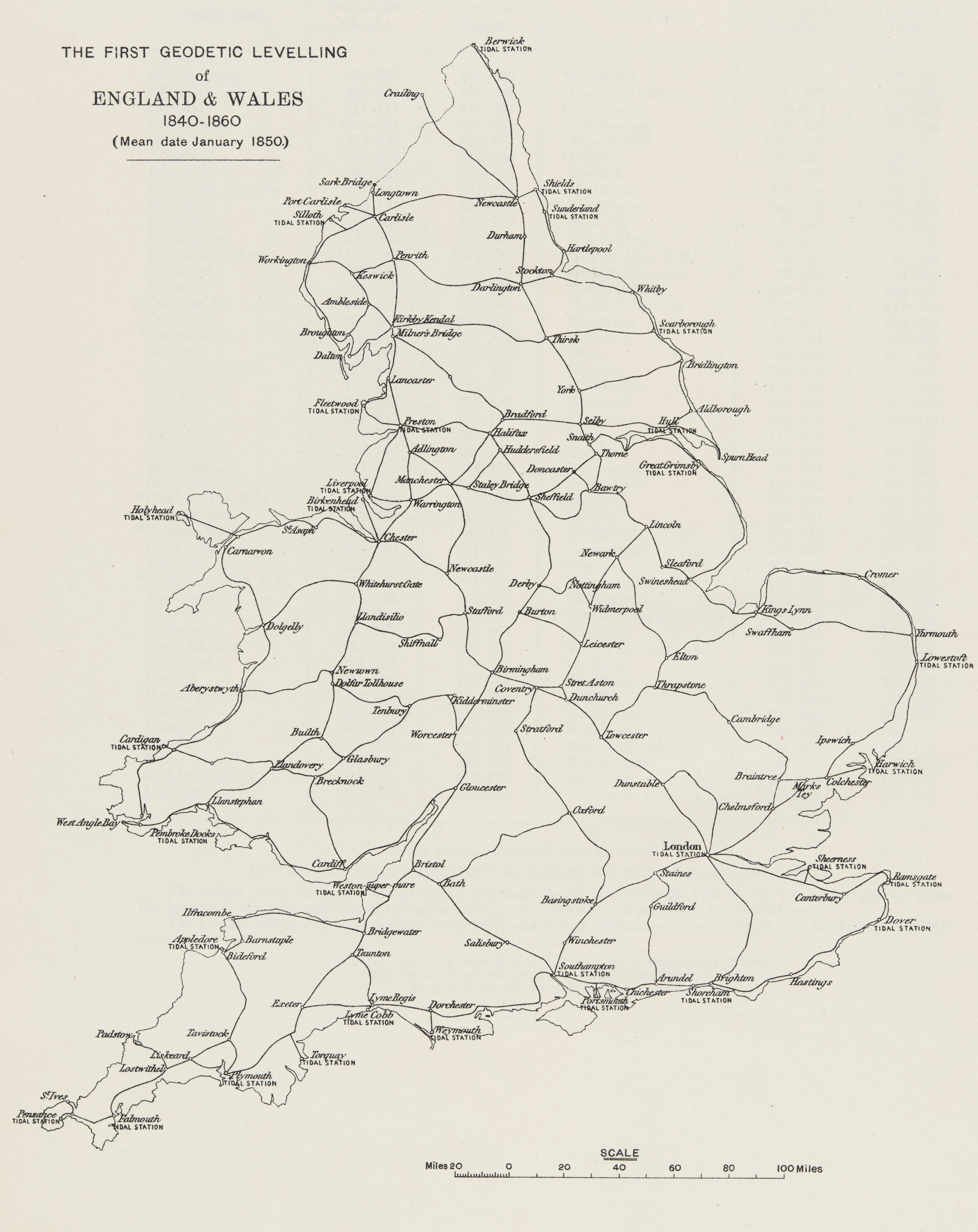
Principal lines of spirit levelling in England, 1860

In addition to the determination of the precise location of the trigonometric points the Survey established the precise altitude of a number of fundamental benchmarks by spirit levelling over the years 1839 to 1860. This height survey was completely independent of the position survey, in contrast to modern GPS fixes which give both. The report of the levelling in Ireland had been published in 1855, and it fell to Clarke to prepare the reports for England and Scotland. For England this involved a least squares analysis for the 62 lines of primary levelling with 91 fundamental benchmarks at the end points and at points of intersection. The reference level was the height of Mean Water at Liverpool. 32 end points were connected to tidal stations and therefore the variation of mean water around the country was fixed. The benchmarking proceeded along the roads, but side lines were taken to, and over, many of the mountain top trig points, from which other trig point altitudes were measured by trigonometric levelling. The reports were published in 1861. Unlike the Principal Triangulation report no theory was included in Clarke's levelling reports.

=== International connections: the longitudinal arc at 52°N, 1863 ===
In James (1863) there is a discussion of the European cooperation proposed by Otto Struve, namely that the Triangulations of Russia, Prussia, Belgium, France and Britain be connected so that arc along the parallel at 52°N could be measured. This large arc, of 75° of longitude, would provide a very valuable constraint on attempts to calculate the figure of the Earth. The Ordnance Survey had completed a cross-channel survey over 50 years previously and, as part of the Principal Triangulation in 1858, had measured the distance from Valentia Island (51°28′N, 10°20′W) to Greenwich (51°55′N). The accuracy of the cross-channel survey was poor by the standards of 1860, and there were also doubts about the Triangulation in Valentia, so it was decided to repeat both sets of measurements.

The extension to France and Belgium is reported in James (1863), providing data for the section of the 52°N arc between Valentia and Mount Kemmel in Belgium. The calculations were carried out by Clarke, who used the data to give a further improvement for the Figure of the Earth. That same data also provided a much tighter foundation for the Anglo-French meridional arc. The data for the re-analysis of the triangulation near Valentia is reported in Clarke & James (1867).

The full 52°N arc as proposed took another thirty years to complete. It is discussed in the article on the Figure of the Earth in Britannica (1911a).

=== Length comparisons and Figure of the Earth, 1866 ===
As soon as the proposal to unite a number of European triangulations had been made it was apparent that the effort would be of little benefit unless conversions between the different length units were established as accurately as possible. This had already been done for some pairs of standards, but a new, high precision comparison of all the standards was now required. The results would also have implications for combining arc measurements to determine the Figure of the Earth, so for this reason non-European standards were also included. The comparisons were carried out under Clarke's supervision in a special building constructed at Survey headquarters in Southampton. He presented the results in two reports: Clarke & James (1866a) compared versions of the standard foot/yard (used in surveys of Britain, India and Australia), versions of the toise (from Russia, Belgium and France), the French metre, and the British copy of the metre. In each case one of the yard standards was taken as the basic unit. Next, Clarke & James (1872) extended the comparisons to a second Russian toise, the Austrian klafter (and two of its copies), and Spanish and American copies of the metre. Clarke found that nominally identical standards differed by small amounts measurable in millionths of a yard (or thousandths of a millimetre).

Clarke & James (1866a) includes an appendix in which Clarke considers the Figure of the Earth once again. He finds:

- a=20926062 ft., c=294.98, (Clarke 1866)
- a=6378263.7 m., c=294.98, (Clarke 1866)

The conversion is 1 metre = 3.280869367 feet (as given in the 1866 paper). This ellipsoid became important because the USCGS adopted it for surveys in 1880. It remains relevant because many US topographic maps are still based on Clarke's 1866 ellipsoid. Moreover, many US legal documents include boundary definitions in terms of latitude and longitude values defined on that ellipsoid.

=== Textbook Geodesy, 1880 ===
Geodesy (Clarke 1880) was the first major survey of the subject since the work of Airy. It was well received throughout Europe and it was translated into a number of languages. It contained 14 chapters. Geodetical Operations — Spherical Trigonometry — Least Squares — Theory of the Figure of the Earth — Distances, Azimuths and Triangles on the Spheroid — Geodetic Lines — Measurement of Base Lines — Instruments and observing — Calculation of Triangulation — Calculation of Latitudes and Longitudes — Heights of Stations — Connection of Geodetic and Astronomical Operations — Figure of the Earth — Pendulums.

The penultimate chapter includes yet another set of values for the Figure of the Earth. This ellipsoid is referred to as Clarke 1880: it is used by many African countries.

- a=20926202 ft., c=293.465, (Clarke 1880)
- a=6378306.37 m., c=293.465, (Clarke 1880)

== Other articles and encyclopedia contributions ==
In addition to his contributions to the reports of the Ordnance Survey, Clarke also published a small number of papers in the learned journals. The papers listed in the Bibliography are almost all related to some aspect of geodesy, the only exceptions being a student publication entitled Propositions on the Tetrahedron and a short paper on Just Intonation which reflects his interest in music.

Clarke also contributed two important articles to the ninth edition of the Encyclopædia Britannica (1878), one on Geodesy and a second on the Figure of the Earth (with the title of the latter being Earth, Figure of the). These articles appear unchanged in the tenth edition (1903). Greatly extended versions, co-authored with Helmert, appear in the eleventh edition (1911) along with a new article on Map co-authored with Close. For details see the Bibliography.

== See also ==
- Alwyn Robbins
- History of the metre
- Seconds pendulum

== Bibliography ==
=== General ===
- Close, Charles Frederick (1910). The second geodetic levelling of England and Wales, 1912—1921. London: H.M.S.O.
- Conolly, T. W. J. (1898). Roll of Officers of the Corps of Royal Engineers From 1660 to 1898. Chatham, Kent: Royal Engineers Institute. p. 31.
- de Santis, Edward (2002). "The Royal Engineers Ubique". Archived from the original on 14 December 2013.
- English Heritage (14 July 1953). "17-22 Carlton Crescent". The National Heritage List for England. Archived from the original on 3 November 2014.
- Hewitt, Rachel (1898). Map of a Nation: a biography of the Ordnance Survey. Granta Books. ISBN 978-1-84708-254-1.
- James, Henry (1873). Account of the field surveying and the preparation of the manuscript plans of the Ordnance Survey. London: HMSO.
- James, Henry (1902). Account of the methods and processes adopted for the production of the Ordnance Survey of the United Kingdom (second ed.). London: H.M.S.O.
- Leonard, A. G. K. (2010). "Carlton Crescent: Southampton's most spectacular Regency development" (PDF). Southampton Local History Forum Journal (Autumn 2010). Southampton City Council. p. 42. Archived from the original (PDF) on 3 November 2014.
- Owen, Tim; Pilbeam, Elaine (1992). Ordnance Survey, map makers to Britain since 1791. Southampton: Ordnance Survey (HMSO). ISBN 9780319002490. OCLC 28220563. Freely available online at the Ordnance Survew, Owen and Pilbeam
- Seymour, W. A., ed. (1980). A History of the Ordnance Survey. Folkestone, England: Dawson. ISBN 978-0-7129-0979-2. OCLC 654935343. Freely available online at the Ordnance Survey, Seymour

=== Biographical ===
- Arden-Close, Charles Frederick (1943). "A Great British Geodesist: Alexander Ross Clarke (1828–1914)". Empire Survey Review. 7 (49): 107–116. doi:10.1179/sre.1943.7.49.107. (Issue 49 of the Review) Charles Close changed his surname to Arden-Close by deed poll in 1938. PDF transcription
- Close, Charles Frederick (1925). "The life and work of Alexander Ross Clarke". Royal Engineers Journal. 39: 658–665. PDF transcription
- "Obituary Notices of Fellows Deceased". Proceedings of the Royal Society of London. 90 (622): xvi–xviii. 1914. JSTOR 93537.
- Sekord, J. A.; Baigent, Elizabeth (2004). "Oxford Dictionary of National Biography". In Baigent, Elizabeth (ed.). Oxford Dictionary of National Biography. Vol. 1 (online ed.). Oxford University Press. doi:10.1093/ref:odnb/37289. (Subscription, Wikipedia Library access or UK public library membership required.)
- "Marriages". The Times of London. 22 November 1853. (p.10, c.4). The actual ceremony took place on 1 November 1853. PDF clipping
- "From the London Gazette, Tuesday, June 14". The Times of London. 15 June 1870. (p.10, c.4). PDF clipping
  - "No. 23624". The London Gazette. 14 June 1870. p. 2957.
- "The Royal Society". The Times of London. 1 December 1887. (p.8, c.1). Royal Medal presented at the anniversary meeting of the Royal Society held on 30 November 1887. PDF clipping
- "Obituary: Colonel A. R. Clarke, C.B., F.R.S.". The Times of London. 12 February 1914. (p.11, c.4). (Death 11 February 1914.) PDF clipping
- "Science To-day: Work of British Association: The Southampton Meeting". The Times of London. 26 August 1925. (p.11, c.4). Opening address PDF clipping
- "Neglected Art of Mapmaking: An English Pioneer". The Times of London. 28 August 1925. (p.11, c.4). British Association. Address by Hinks PDF clipping
- "Clarke, Col Alexander Ross". Who Was Who (1897-1916). Vol. 59. 1907. pp. 339–340. doi:10.1093/ww/9780199540884.013.U184701. Google Books
- Winterbottom, H. S. L. (1914). "Obituary". Nature. 92 (2312): 692–693. doi:10.1038/092692b0.

=== Clarke's Ordnance Survey publications ===
The following list contains the major reports prepared by Clarke, as well as his text book. The title pages of many of the reports mention only Colonel Henry James, Superintendent of the Ordnance Survey, but in every case it is made clear that Clarke was de facto author.

- Clarke, Alexander Ross; James, Henry (1858b). Account of the observations and calculations of the Principal Triangulation; and of the figure, dimensions and mean specific gravity of the Earth as derived therefrom. London: G.E. Eyre and W. Spottiswoode. OCLC 757179661. PLATES. An excellent summary of the report was published in the Monthly Notices of the Royal Astronomical Society.
- Clarke, Alexander Ross (1861). "On the figure of the Earth". Memoirs of the Royal Astronomical Society. 29: 25–44.
- James, Henry (1861a). Abstract of the principal lines of spirit levelling in England and Wales. London: G.E. Eyre and W. Spottiswoode. Two volumes, the second comprising a map and 24 other plates. The title page credits Clarke as the principal author. No web copy available.
- James, Henry (1861b). Abstract of the principal lines of spirit levelling in Scotland. London: G.E. Eyre and W. Spottiswoode. Two volumes, the second comprising a map and 24 other plates. The title page credits Clarke as the principal author. No web copy available.
- James, Henry (1863). Extension of the Triangulation of the Ordnance Survey into France and Belgium with the measurement of an arc of parallel in latitude 52°N. from Valentia in Ireland to Mount Kemmel in Belgium. London: G.E. Eyre and W. Spottiswoode. OCLC 69084263. An appendix to the account of the principal triangulation of Great Britain and Ireland.
- Clarke, Alexander Ross; James, Henry (1866a). Comparisons of the standards of length of England, France, Belgium, Prussia, Russia, India, Australia, made at the Ordnance survey office, Southampton. London: G.E. Eyre and W. Spottiswoode for H.M. Stationery Office. OCLC 906501. Appendix on Figure of the Earth pp. 281–287. A brief summary of this paper was published in the proceedings of the Royal Society. This summary does not include the appendix on Figure of the Earth.
- Clarke, Alexander Ross; James, Henry (1867). Determination of the positions of Feaghmain and Haverfordwest, longitude stations on the great European arc of parallel. London: G.E. Eyre and W. Spottiswoode. OCLC 682068428. An appendix to the account of the principal triangulation of Great Britain and Ireland.
- Clarke, Alexander Ross; James, Henry (1872). "Results of the Comparisons of the Standards of Length of England, Austria, Spain, United States, Cape of Good Hope, and of a Second Russian Standard, Made at the Ordnance Survey Office, Southampton". Phil. Trans. R. Soc. Lond. 163: 445–469. doi:10.1098/rstl.1873.0014. The Preface by Henry James includes a determination of the cubit (of Egypt) against the British foot.
- Clarke, Alexander Ross (1880). Geodesy. Oxford: Clarendon Press. OCLC 2484948. Freely available online at Archive.org and Forgotten Books (ISBN 9781440088650). In addition the book has been reprinted by Nabu Press (ISBN 978-1286804131).

=== Clarke's other scientific papers ===
- Royal Society of London (1914). Catalogue of scientific papers, 1800-1900. Cambridge University Press. OL 7029325M. Volumes 1 (p. 934), 7 (p. 395) and 9 (p. 526) list the following papers:
  - Clarke, Alexander Ross (1850). "Propositions on the tetrahedron". Mathematician. 3: 182–189.
  - —— (1851). "On the measurements of azimuths on a spheroid". Monthly Notices of the Royal Astronomical Society. 11 (6): 147–148. doi:10.1093/mnras/11.6.147.
  - —— (1858a). "Note on Archdeacon Pratt's Paper on the effect of local attraction in the English Arc". Philosophical Transactions of the Royal Society. 148: 787–790. doi:10.1098/rstl.1858.0033. See John Pratt (Archdeacon of Calcutta)
  - —— (1859a). "Note on the figure of the Earth". Monthly Notices of the Royal Astronomical Society. 19: 36–38. doi:10.1093/mnras/19.1.36.
  - —— (1859b). "On the reduction of occultations". Memoirs of the Royal Astronomical Society. 27: 97–110.
  - —— (1860). "Description of the Projection Used in the Topographical Department of the War Office for Maps Embracing Large Portions of the Earth's Surface". Journal of the Royal Geographical Society of London. 30: 106–111. doi:10.2307/1798292. JSTOR 1798292. This article appears under the name of the Superintendent James but he does acknowledge that it was actually written by Clarke.
  - —— (1861). "On the figure of the Earth". Memoirs of the Royal Astronomical Society. 29: 2544.
  - —— (1866b). "On Archdeacon Platt's Figure of the Earth". Philosophical Magazine. 31: 193–196.
  - —— (1866c). "On the figure of the earth". Philosophical Magazine. 32: 236–237.
  - —— (1870a). "On a determination of the direction of the meridian with a Russian diagonal transit instrument". Memoirs of the Royal Astronomical Society. 37: 57–74.
  - —— (1870b). "On the course of geodesic lines on the Earth's surface". Philosophical Magazine. 39: 352–363.
  - —— (1876). "On the elasticity of brass". Philosophical Magazine. 2 (9): 131–134. doi:10.1080/14786447608639175.
  - —— (1877a). "Just intonation". Nature. 15 (373): 159–160. doi:10.1038/015159a0. Page 159, page 253, page 353.
  - —— (1877b). "On a correction to observed latitudes". Philosophical Magazine. 4 (25): 302–305. doi:10.1080/14786447708639342.
  - —— (1877c). "On the potential of an ellipsoid at an external point". Philosophical Magazine. 4 (27): 458–61. doi:10.1080/14786447708639369.
  - —— (1878). "On the figure of the Earth". Philosophical Magazine. 6 (35): 81–93. doi:10.1080/14786447808639480.

=== Clarke's encyclopedia articles ===
- Clarke, Alexander Ross (1878). "Earth, Figure of the". In Baynes, T. S. (ed.). Encyclopædia Britannica. Vol. 7 (9th ed.). New York: Charles Scribner's Sons. pp. 597–608.***Please note a wikilink to the article [Earth, Figure of the] in EB9 is not available***
- —— (1879). "Geodesy". In Baynes, T. S. (ed.). Encyclopædia Britannica. Vol. 10 (9th ed.). New York: Charles Scribner's Sons. pp. 163–172.***Please note a wikilink to the article [Geodesy] in EB9 is not available***
- ——; Helmert, Friedrich Robert (1911). "Earth, Figure of the" . In Chisholm, Hugh (ed.). Encyclopædia Britannica. Vol. 8 (11th ed.). Cambridge University Press. pp. 801–814. Better formatted mathematics at Wikisource.
- ——; —— (1911). "Geodesy" . In Chisholm, Hugh (ed.). Encyclopædia Britannica. Vol. 11 (11th ed.). Cambridge University Press. pp. 607–615.
- ——; Close, Charles (1911). "Map" . In Chisholm, Hugh (ed.). Encyclopædia Britannica. Vol. 17 (11th ed.). Cambridge University Press. pp. 629–663.
