= Arthur Henley Dowson =

British Army officer (1908–1989)

Major-General Arthur Henley Dowson CBE CB
- Portrait by Walter Bird (National Portrait Gallery)
- Born: 7 December 1908; Alexandria, Egypt
- Died: 15 December 1989 (aged 81); Kings Lynn, Norfolk, England
- Military career
- Allegiance: United Kingdom
- Branch: British Army
- Service years: 1928–1961
- Rank: Major-General
- Service number: 40372
- Unit: Royal Engineers
- Conflicts: Second World War: North African Campaign; Italian Campaign
- Awards: Companion of the Order of the Bath; Commander of the Order of the British Empire; Bronze Star Medal
- Other work: ADC to Queen Elizabeth II; Director-General of the Ordnance Survey

Major-General Arthur Henley Dowson (7 December 1908 – 15 December 1989), known as Henley Dowson, was an officer in the Royal Engineers. He graduated at the Royal Military Academy, Woolwich in 1928, then at King's College, Cambridge for an engineering degree in 1931. His British Army career included active service in several theatres during World War 2, and post-war he headed the Ordnance Survey and served as ADC to Queen Elizabeth II.

He made a significant contribution whilst attached to the US Fifth Army during the Italian Campaign and was awarded the Bronze Star Medal by them in 1948 in recognition of his service. In 1961 he was made CBE and in 1964 a Companion of the Bath. He retired with the rank of major-general in 1961.

His work at the Ordnance Survey included overseeing some of the more difficult transitions from hand-work to modern technology.

After retirement, he was active in local affairs in Herefordshire and in Norfolk, where he died aged 81, leaving a wife and daughter.

== Early years ==
Dowson was born in Alexandria on 12 December 1908. He attended Haileybury School.

== Royal Engineers ==
After training at the Royal Military Academy, Woolwich, Dowson graduated as a 2nd lieutenant in the Corps of Royal Engineers, which was gazetted on 31 August 1928. He went on to King's College, Cambridge, to take an engineering degree which, as it does now, would have included surveying.

His first post was to 5 Field Company at Aldershot Garrison, then as Garrison Engineer. He then joined the Field Division of the Ordnance Survey.

=== World War II ===
At the start of World War II in 1939, Dowson was sent with the British Expeditionary Force to France as staff captain, HQ 2 Corps, and then returned to England, where he formed, and subsequently commanded, 516 Field Survey Company. In 1943 he took the company to North Africa to join the First Army. He was promoted to lieutenant-colonel and joined the Survey Staff of HQ First Army. A post to Allied Forces HQ followed, and that same year he was attached to HQ of the US 5th Army in Italy as senior British engineer. Part of his work was to coordinate British and South African units as well as liaising with the US Army Engineer and Topographic units. Some surveying had to be done from scratch, and military activity could frustrate efforts to establish reliable maps. Maps had to be produced and printed in their hundreds, and demolition and repair works had to be organised. Dowson worked with 5th Army HQ until the end of the war.

=== Post-war ===
In 1945, Lt. Col. Dowson was appointed Officer of the Military Division of the Order of the British Empire (OBE) in recognition of his war service. Returning to the War Office after hostilities ended, he was awarded the Bronze Star Medal for his service while attached (as senior British Royal Engineer officer) to the US Army in Italy.

In 1949, Dowson was the chief instructor, and then commandant, of the Royal School of Military Survey, and later director of field surveys at the Ordnance Survey.

In 1958, Brigadier Dowson was appointed aide-de-camp (ADC) to The Queen on 27 November. In 1959, he was an ex-officio member of the council of the Institution of Royal Engineers. In 1960, he was honorary colonel of 135 Engineer Regiment (Territorial Army).

In 1961, Dowson's honour of OBE was elevated to CBE for his army service in the Military Division of the New Year Honours list. On promotion to major-general, he stepped down from the post of ADC.

In the Ordnance Survey, and civilian and government surveyors, particular difficulties arose over the clear need to level up qualifications between civilian and military surveyors. This led to some resignations (including the director general of the OS) and acrimony, but Dowson in his role as a director of the OS, was able to bring about a satisfactory conclusion over a period of time. Dowson retired from the army with the rank of major-general in 1961 and in the same year took up the post of Director of the OS. During his tenure at the helm, he oversaw significant changes: the start of the new premises in Southampton; the retriangulation of Britain nearing its completion; much remapping having to be done. In addition, the National Grid system had been fully incorporated, and some of the work was being automated. Above all, the OS had become entrenched in methods of working and the technology being used, and Dowson was able to resolves these issues despite some controversy and opposition, resisting the temptation to resign before the problems had been resolved.

In 1964, Dowson was photographed by Walter Bird for the National Portrait Gallery and a further honour was bestowed on him: Companion of the Bath.

== Awards ==
- 1945 OBE (Military)
- 1948 Bronze Star Medal (USA)
- 1961 CBE
- 1964 CB

== Personal life ==
In 1932 Dowson was living at the 17th century Frith Manor in Lingfield parish near East Grinstead with Kenneth and Dorothy Wynford Dowson. He married Mary Evelyn (Eve) Savage at Holy Trinity Church, South Kensington, on 26 March 1933. In 1936, they were living in Bexley, Kent. After the war, they lived in London.

Henley Dowson was variously described by colleagues as neat, well-organised, highly intelligent, cheerful, athletic and reliable, and "an imaginative and sensitive friend".

Following his retirement in 1965, they moved to Norfolk permanently, and Henley was able to enjoy more leisure activity, including sailing, golf, skiing, music and gardening, and he involved himself in the preservation of the Norfolk coast, including fundraising and several years as chairman of the Norfolk Broads Consortium Committee.

Dowson had not lost interest in his former profession, and in 1971 he collaborated with Sir Lawrence Bragg on a book about artillery in World War I, and in 1980 he contributed to the comprehensive A History of the Ordnance Survey. A principal contributor was Major-General Edge, who had succeeded Dowson as Director General of the Ordnance Survey, and had praised his predecessor's perseverance.

In 1973 they moved to Herefordshire with its excellent fishing, and they worked for Hereford Cathedral and the Three Choirs Festival.

In 1984 the Dowsons returned to live in Norfolk, and not long afterwards, Henley was diagnosed with Parkinson's Disease. After spending his last months in a nursing home, he died on 19 December 1989, survived by his wife and daughter.

Obituaries were published by several organisations, including King's College and the Daily Telegraph. He has a memorial bench at Brancaster.
