= Wittenberg University Speleological Society =

Caving grotto

- Abbreviation: WUSS
- Formation: May 14, 1980; 46 years ago
- Location: Springfield, Ohio
- Affiliations: National Speleological Society (#G-268)
- Website: WUSS Official Website
- Formerly called: Wittenberg Caving Club

The Wittenberg University Speleological Society (WUSS) is a student-run grotto of the National Speleological Society (NSS) created in 1980, dedicated to the advancement of speleology. WUSS has more than 500 members, current and past students, faculty and staff of Wittenberg University, as well as community members dedicated to the scientific study, exploration, and preservation of caves and karst environments. The organization is based out of Wittenberg University in Springfield, Ohio.

== History ==
WUSS received its official charter (Internal Organization #G-268) from the NSS on 14 May 1980. The organization was created as a successor to the Wittenberg Caving Club, which was formed in 1977 by Dr. Horton H. Hobbs III and Jeff Marion. After its induction into the NSS, WUSS elected Michael Flynn as its first grotto president.

- 1980 - A grant from the Ohio Department of Natural Resources helped to support the survey of more than 40 caves during the summer.
- 1981 - Work on the Carter Caves State Resort Park karst survey began. The first issue of Pholeos was published.
- 1985 - WUSS published a map of Freeland's Cave in Adams County, Ohio, the longest surveyed, non-commercial, cave in the state.
- 1986 - A grant from the Ohio Department of Natural Resources funded the survey of 11 caves in six counties throughout Ohio.
- 1988 - Six members of WUSS accompanied Ronald Reagan Jr. to northern Alabama to do a TV spot for ABC's Good Morning America which aired 16 February. The Ohio Cave Protection Act, authored by WUSSes was passed by the Ohio House and Senate.
- 1989 - WUSS received the NSS Conservation Award for its outstanding contributions to cave conservation at the NSS annual meeting in Sewanee, Tennessee.
- 1992 - A two-year study, funded by the National Park Service, into assessing the ecological resources of caves in the Russell Cave National Monument, Alabama was initiated. Also, a three-year study began, funded by the U.S. Department of Agriculture, to examine the biota and general ecological resources of 28 caves within the boundaries of the Hoosier National Forest in southern Indiana.
- 2007 - A four-year grant from the Ohio Department of Natural Resources funded WUSS to conduct an extensive study into the cave and karst regions of the state. The study increased the number of known caves in the state as well as the number of cave specific, endemic, species.

== Activities ==
=== Publications ===
WUSS produces a biannual scientific journal called Pholeos (from Greek φολεος - cave) . The first issue was published in 1981, and currently is sent out to more than 500 subscribers throughout all fifty states and 28 countries.

=== Cave Research ===
Members have published more than 150 articles in scientific journals, and continue to make contributions in the areas of speleology, geology, biology, limnology, ecology, and microbiology.

=== Cave Survey ===
The organization has a long history of contributing to cave survey and mapping work, beginning in 1978 with Dry Cave, Highland County, Ohio. Since then, members have surveyed more than 32 kilometers (19.86 miles) of passage in more than 200 caves in four states.

=== Vertical Work ===
As part of its commitment to promoting safety in caves, WUSS conducts a variety of workshops, clinics, and trainings related to high-angle rope work, as well as providing public resources. Clinics, initially intended for grotto members, have expanded over the years to include workshops at nearby Wright State University and an annual training during the Winter Adventure Weekend at Carter Caves State Resort Park.

== Accolades ==
- 1986 - Horton Hobbs III (WUSS #0001) received the NSS Fellow Award during the NSS Convention.
- 1994 - Kevin Simon (WUSS #0221) received The James G. Mitchell Award for Best Student Paper presented at the NSS Convention in Brackettville, Texas.
- 1995 - Kevin Simon (WUSS #0221) received the James G. Mitchell Award for Best Student Paper presented at the NSS Convention.
- 1996 - Annette Summers Engel (WUSS #0244) received the James G. Mitchell Award for Best Student Paper presented at the NSS Convention.
- 1998 - Megan Porter (WUSS #0262) received the James G. Mitchell Award for Best Student Paper presented at the NSS Convention.
- 2000 - Don Conover (WUSS #0356) received the NSS Fellow Award during the NSS Convention.
- 2003 - Annette Summers Engel (WUSS #0244) and Megan Porter (WUSS #0262) received NSS Fellow Awards during the NSS Convention.
- 2005 - Bill Stitzel (WUSS #0132) received the NSS Fellow Award and Lindsay Walker (McCullough) (WUSS #0469) received The James G. Mitchell Award for Best Student Paper presented at the NSS Convention.
- 2007 - Horton Hobbs III (WUSS #0001) received the Cardinal Award, the state of Ohio's highest award for conservation.
- 2014 - Annette Summers Engel (WUSS #0244) received the Science Award at the NSS Convention.

== See also ==
- Caving
- Speleology
- Cave survey
- Pit cave
