= Marguerite Lefèvre =

Belgian geographer

Marguerite Alice Lefèvre (1894–1967) was an academic geographer and the first woman to hold a professorship at the Catholic University of Leuven. A prize at the Katholieke Universiteit Leuven and a street in Leuven are named in her honour.

== Life ==
Lefèvre was born in Steenokkerzeel on 1 March 1894, the daughter of Théophile Lefèvre and Elisabeth Verhulst. She had two brothers, Jean and Maurice. In 1913 she qualified as a teacher at the Paridaens Institute, and started teaching at the Miniemeninstituut. In 1917 she became secretary to Paul Lambert Michotte. In 1921, a year after Leuven university began to accept female students, she enrolled in the business school, going on to obtain a licentiate degree in Commercial and Consular Sciences. In 1925 she completed her doctorate in Paris with a thesis on "L'Habitat rural en Belgique" supervised by Albert Demangeon.

Lefèvre was appointed an assistant at Leuven university in 1927 and in 1931 spent six months on a fellowship at Columbia University. Throughout the 1930s she organised student excursions to experience geographical features first hand, leading to the nickname "le cheftaine" ("the scoutmistress"). At Paul Michotte's death in 1940 she took over from him as Secretary General of the International Geographical Union, serving until 1949. While building an international reputation as a geographer, her career at the university of Leuven progressed very slowly, with appointment as full professor only in 1960, despite having been Director of the Geographical Institute for years. She was the first woman appointed to a professorship at the university. She died in Leuven on 27 December 1967.

== Publications ==
- La densité des maisons rurales en Belgique, Annales de Géographie, 179 (1923), pp. 395–417.
- Le congrès International de Géographie (1928), Annales, 1 (1929), pp. 73–75.
- La morphologie glaciaire de la Haute Tatra, Revue de Géographie Alpine, 17:4 (1929), pp. 747–755.
- Excursion no 8: Amazonie, Annales de Géographie, 353 (1957), pp. 75–77.
