= Southern California Grotto =

Chapter of the National Speleological Society

The Southern California Grotto (usually shortened to SoCal Grotto) is a chapter of the National Speleological Society (NSS) based in the Greater Los Angeles area.

Founded in 1948, the Southern California Grotto, is one of the oldest chapters of the NSS and is one of the largest grottos in the western United States. The Southern California Grotto has a long history of active caving and cave related projects throughout California and other states, and extending to other areas of the world. Members of the Grotto endorse the goals of the National Speleological Society – the study, exploration, and conservation of caves. The motto: "Take nothing but pictures. Leave nothing but footprints. Kill nothing but time." summarizes the ideals practiced by Southern California Grotto cavers while exploring the underground world.

== History ==
William Halliday organized the first meeting of the Southern California Grotto on September 29, 1948, at Huntington Memorial Hospital, where he was working as an intern. Twenty prospective members attended the first meeting and of these, five were members of the National Speleological Society: Denny Constantine worked at the Los Angeles County Museum and is now known for his expertise in bat species. Karl Heinize was an astronaut who died on a climbing expedition to Mount Everest. Richard Logan was a professor of geography at the University of California. George Neuerburg was an expert in hard rock mining.

On December 10, 1948, the Southern California Grotto was chartered as the sixteenth grotto of the NSS and the first grotto in California. However, the official charter was not issued until July 1, 1958, and it listed the Southern California Grotto as being active since January 31, 1949. Bill Halliday was the first grotto chair and meetings at the Pasadena Public Library Auditorium started in November 1948. During the first year, grotto membership increased from 8 to 34. Also in that first year, the grotto had 13 official trips to caves in California, Arizona, Nevada, and New Mexico. The first grotto trip was to Lilburn Cave on October 2–3, 1948. Kokoweef Cave was the second grotto trip in November 1948.

== Cave conservation ==
Members of the SoCal Grotto volunteer on conservation projects each year. Work is done California, the western United States, and in international projects. In California, the grotto assists state and federal agencies such as Providence Mountains State Recreation Area, Sequoia, Kings Canyon, Death Valley National Parks, and the Mojave National Preserve.

== Cave research ==
Members of the grotto participate in a number of research projects as both principal investigators, and as field assistants. Current projects include the Earth-Mars Cave Detection Expedition, in the Mojave Desert, several projects at Cathedral and other caves in Arizona, and the XMET project in Belize.

== Media ==
The SoCal Grotto has assisted media companies in Hollywood, as it is the closest caving organization and members have consulted on a number of feature films, documentaries, TV shows, news programs, and newspapers.
