= Holy Trinity Church, South Kensington =

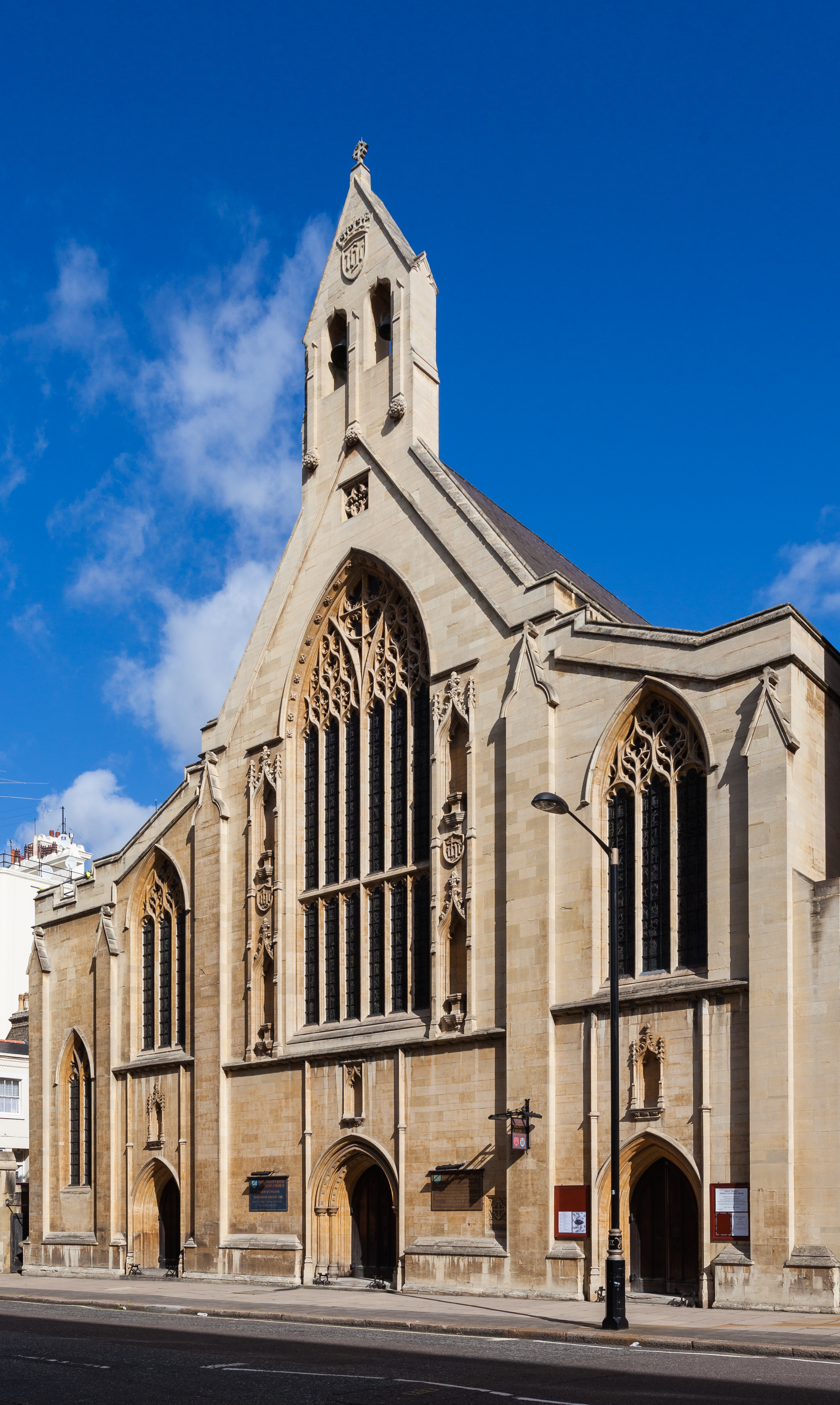
- The exterior of the church on Prince Consort Road
- Holy Trinity Church, South Kensington
- 51°30′0.16″N 0°10′43.69″W
- Location: Prince Consort Rd, London SW7 2BA
- Country: England
- Denomination: Church of England
- Churchmanship: Prayer Book Anglican
- Website: http://www.htsk.co.uk/

Architecture
- Architect: George Frederick Bodley
- Style: In the 14th century Perpendicular style
- Years built: 1901

Administration
- Diocese: Diocese of London

Clergy
- Priest: Liz Russell

Holy Trinity Church, South Kensington, is an Anglican church located on Prince Consort Road in the City of Westminster, London, England. The current building dates from 1901 and was built by George Frederick Bodley and Cecil Greenwood Hare.

Edward Ashmore, Arthur Henley Dowson and Gilbert Spencer were married in the church.

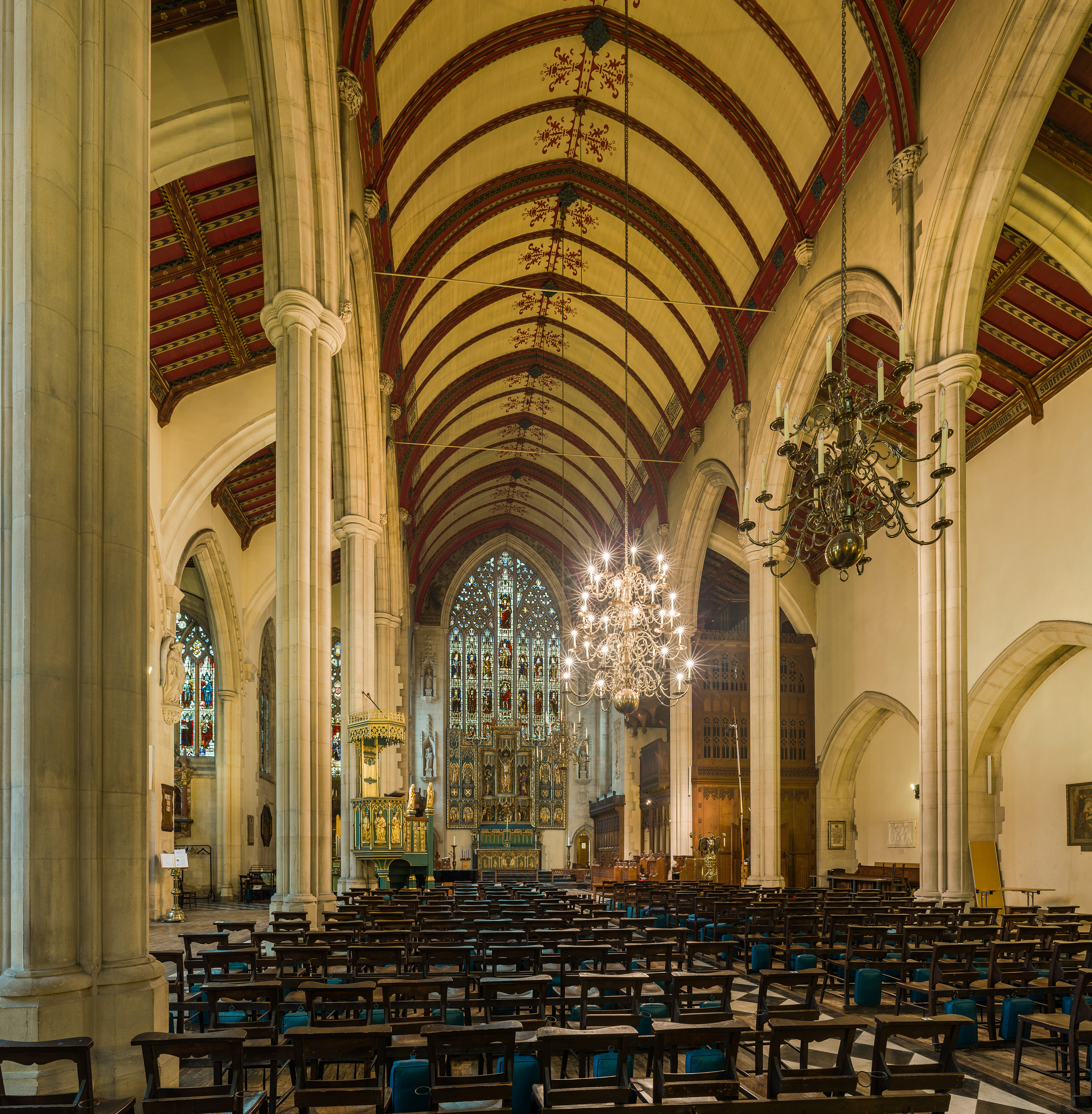
The interior

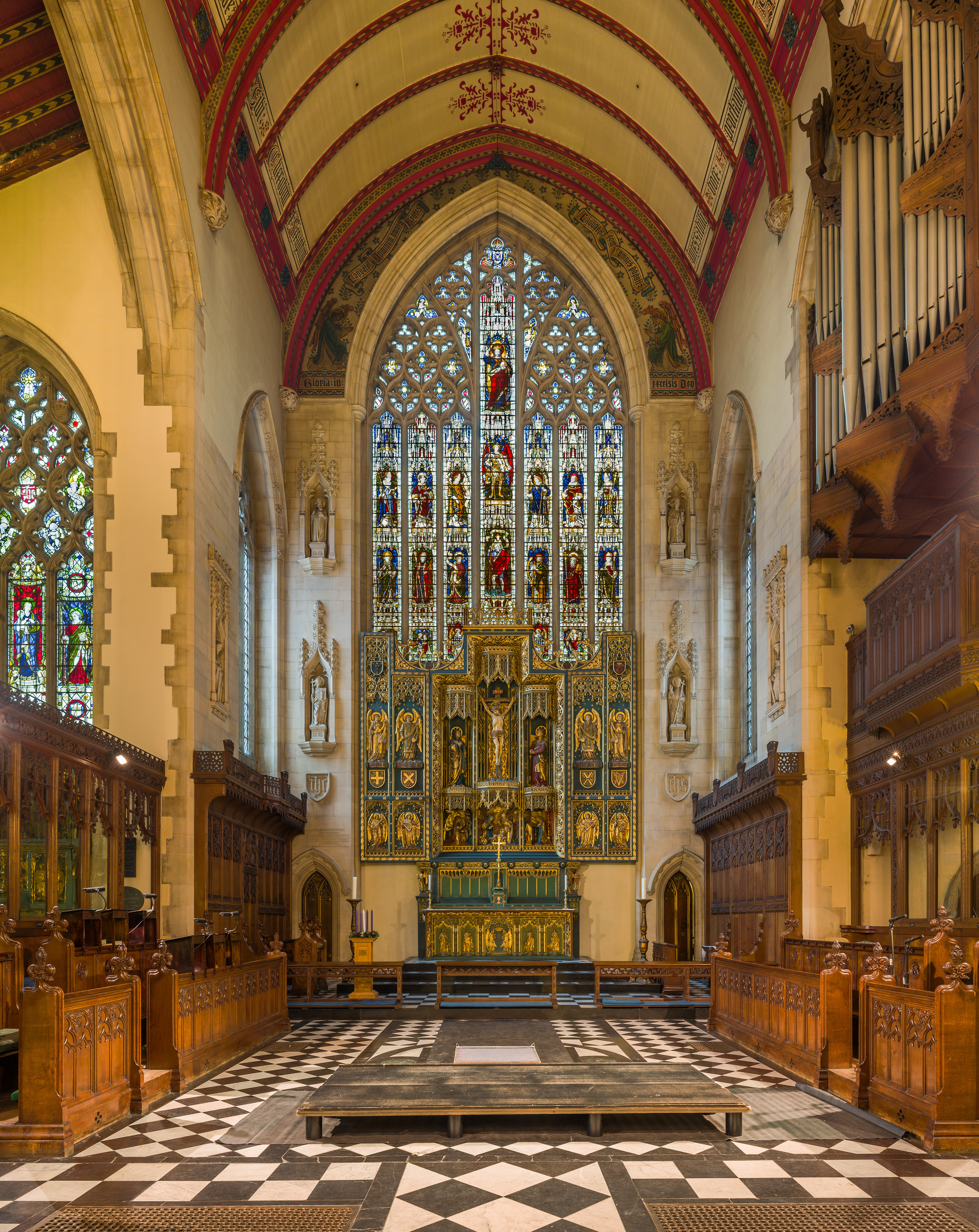
The reredos
