= Grotto (National Speleological Society) =

Internal organization of the National Speleological Society

A Grotto is an internal organization of the National Speleological Society (NSS). They generally function as the local NSS chapter/club. Many Grottos however, operate in areas outside their local area, with many operating in several states. Most Grottos also participate in Regions which are loose associations of Grottos. Regions are also an internal organization of the National Speleological Society.

== Organization ==
Grottos are required to meet certain organizational requirements as outlined by the National Speleological Society. These include:

- A constitution and bylaws that are submitted to, and approved by, the NSS
- A minimum of at least five members of the Society
- It is NSS policy that full membership in a Grotto requires NSS membership. However, in practice, this is often not the case.

An annual report describing various aspects of the Grotto is submitted to the NSS.

== History ==
The New England Grotto was the first NSS Grotto. It was chartered in 1941 with Clay Perry as president and Ned Anderson as vice-president.

== Grottos of the NSS ==
Below are the Grottos of the NSS as listed in June 2026. Each grotto links to its own website where one exists, otherwise to its page on the NSS site.

=== Alabama ===
- Birmingham Grotto
- Central Alabama Grotto
- Cullman Grotto
- Druid City Grotto
- Gadsden Grotto
- Huntsville Grotto
- Jackson County Grotto
- Montgomery Grotto
- RAT Grotto

=== Alaska ===
- Glacier Grotto

=== Arizona ===
- Central Arizona Grotto
- Cochise County Cavers
- Escabrosa Grotto
- Mule Mountain Caving Club
- Northern Arizona Grotto
- Southern Arizona Grotto

=== Arkansas ===
- Boston Mountain Grotto
- Central Region Arkansas Grotto
- COBRA Grotto
- Little Rock Grotto
- Middle Ozark Lower Earth Society MOLES

=== California ===
- Desert Dog Troglodytes
- Diablo Grotto
- Mother Lode Grotto
- Redwood Grotto
- San Diego Grotto
- San Francisco Bay Chapter of the NSS
- San Joaquin Valley Grotto
- Shascade Caving Society
- Shasta Area Grotto
- Southern California Grotto
- Stanislaus Speleology Association

=== Colorado ===
- Colorado Grotto
- Colorado School of Mines Grotto
- Colorado Western Slope Grotto
- Front Range Grotto
- Grotto of the Ancients
- Northern Colorado Mountain Grotto
- Southern Colorado Mountain Grotto
- Timberline Grotto

=== Connecticut ===
- Central Connecticut Grotto

=== Delaware ===
- Commander Cody Caving Club

=== District of Columbia ===
- District of Columbia Grotto

=== Florida ===
- Central Florida Grotto
- Flint River Grotto
- Florida Speleological Society
- River City Grotto
- Tampa Bay Area Grotto

=== Georgia ===
- Athens Speleological Society
- Augusta Cave Masters
- Clayton County Cavers
- Clock Tower Grotto
- Dogwood City Grotto
- Middle Georgia Grotto
- Pigeon Mountain Grotto
- Team Poseidon

=== Hawaii ===
- Hawaii Grotto

=== Idaho ===
- Gem State Grotto
- Rowdy Rendezvous
- Silver Sage Grotto

=== Illinois ===
- Little Egypt Grotto
- Near Normal Grotto
- Sub-Urban Chicago Grotto
- Windy City Grotto

=== Indiana ===
- Bloomington Indiana Grotto
- Central Indiana Grotto
- Eastern Indiana Grotto
- Evansville Metropolitan Grotto
- Harrison Crawford Grotto
- Northern Indiana Grotto
- Saint Joseph Valley Grotto
- Western Indiana Grotto

=== Iowa ===
- Iowa Grotto

=== Kansas ===
- Kansas City Area Grotto
- Kansas Speleological Society

=== Kentucky ===
- Blue Grass Grotto
- Green River Grotto
- Louisville Grotto
- Pine Mountain Grotto
- Rockcastle Regional Grotto

=== Louisiana ===
- Crescent City Cavers

=== Maine ===
- Boston Grotto
- Vermont Cavers Association

=== Maryland ===
- Baltimore Grotto
- Frederick Grotto
- Sligo Grotto
- Western Maryland Grotto

=== Massachusetts ===
- Boston Grotto

=== Michigan ===
- Detroit Urban Grotto
- Michigan Interlakes Grotto

=== Minnesota ===
- Minnesota Caving Club
- Minnesota Speleological Survey

=== Mississippi ===
- JUST Cavers

=== Missouri ===
- Branson Area Tri-Lakes Grotto
- Chouteau Grotto
- Daedalus Cavers Grotto
- Kansas City Area Grotto
- Meramec Valley Grotto
- Middle Mississippi Valley Grotto
- Missouri School of Mines Spelunkers Club
- Ozark Highlands Grotto
- Roubidoux Grotto
- SEMO Grotto
- Springfield Plateau Grotto
- Stygian Grotto

=== Montana ===
- Northern Rocky Mountain Grotto

=== Nebraska ===
- Armpit Grotto
- Hole-in-the-Wall Grotto
- Paha Sapa Grotto

=== Nevada ===
- Northern Nevada Grotto
- Southern Nevada Grotto

=== New Hampshire ===
- Boston Grotto
- Vermont Cavers Association

=== New Jersey ===
- Central New Jersey Grotto
- New Jersey Tri-State Speleological Society
- Northern New Jersey Grotto

=== New Mexico ===
- Gila Area Grotto
- Grotto of the Ancients
- Mesilla Valley Grotto
- New Mexico Tech Student Grotto
- Pajarito Grotto
- Pecos Valley Grotto
- Sandia Grotto
- Sierra Blanca Grotto
- White Sands Grotto

=== New York ===
- Helderberg-Hudson Grotto
- Met Grotto
- Niagara Frontier Grotto
- Rensselaer Outing Club
- Shawangunk-Catskill Area Grotto
- Syracuse University Outing Club

=== North Carolina ===
- Charlotte Caving Club
- Flittermouse Grotto
- Triangle Troglodytes

=== North Dakota ===
- Paha Sapa Grotto

=== Ohio ===
- Central Ohio Grotto
- Cleveland Grotto
- Dayton Underground Grotto
- Greater Cincinnati Grotto
- Miami Valley Grotto
- Ohio Cavers and Climbers
- Standing Stone Grotto
- Wittenberg University Speleological Society

=== Oklahoma ===
- Arbuckle Mountains Grotto
- Central Oklahoma Grotto
- Tulsa Regional OK Grotto

=== Oregon ===
- Oregon Grotto
- Oregon High Desert Grotto
- Willamette Valley Grotto

=== Pennsylvania ===
- Bald Eagle Grotto
- Bucks County Grotto
- Franklin County Grotto
- Greater Allentown Grotto
- Huntingdon County Cave Hunters
- Loyalhanna Grotto
- Nittany Grotto
- Philadelphia Grotto
- Pittsburgh Grotto
- Seven Valleys Grotto
- York Grotto

=== Puerto Rico ===
- Puerto Rico Grotto (GEO)

=== Rhode Island ===
- Boston Grotto
- Vermont Cavers Association

=== South Carolina ===
- South Carolina Interstate Grotto

=== South Dakota ===
- Paha Sapa Grotto

=== Tennessee ===
- Chattanooga Grotto
- East Tennessee Grotto
- Mountain Empire Grotto
- Nashville Grotto
- Sewanee Mountain Grotto
- Six Ridges Grotto
- Smoky Mountain Grotto
- Southport Chronic Cavers
- Spencer Mountain Grotto
- Upper Cumberland Grotto

=== Texas ===
- Aggie Grotto
- Bexar Grotto
- Dallas-Fort Worth Grotto
- Greater Houston Grotto
- GUAD Grotto
- Lubbock Area Grotto
- Permian Basin Speleological Society
- UT Grotto

=== Utah ===
- Grotto of the Ancients
- Salt Lake Grotto
- Timpanogos Grotto
- Wasatch Grotto

=== Vermont ===
- Vermont Cavers Association

=== Virginia ===
- Battlefield Area Troglodyte Society
- Blue Ridge Grotto
- Charlottesville Grotto
- Fredericksburg Underground Network
- Front Royal Grotto
- James River Grotto
- Madison University Student Grotto
- New River Valley Grotto
- Richmond Area Speleological Society
- Tidewater Grotto
- Virginia Highlands Grotto
- VPI Cave Club
- Walker Mountain Grotto

=== Washington ===
- Cascade Grotto

=== West Virginia ===
- Charleston Grotto
- ESSO Grotto
- Germany Valley Grotto
- Greater Randolph Organization for Speleological Science
- Greenbrier Grotto
- Monongahela Grotto
- Monroe County Cavers
- Mountain State Grotto
- Parkersburg Area Grotto
- Tri-State Grotto
- West Virginia University Student Grotto
- Western Maryland Grotto

=== Wisconsin ===
- Wisconsin Speleological Society

=== Wyoming ===
- Armpit Grotto
- Hole-in-the-Wall Grotto
- Rowdy Rendezvous

=== International ===
- Anthros Costa Rica Grotto

=== Traveling ===
- Gypsy Underground Grotto
- Out of Bounds Grotto
- Stonewall Cavers
