= Stanisław Leszczycki =

Polish geographer

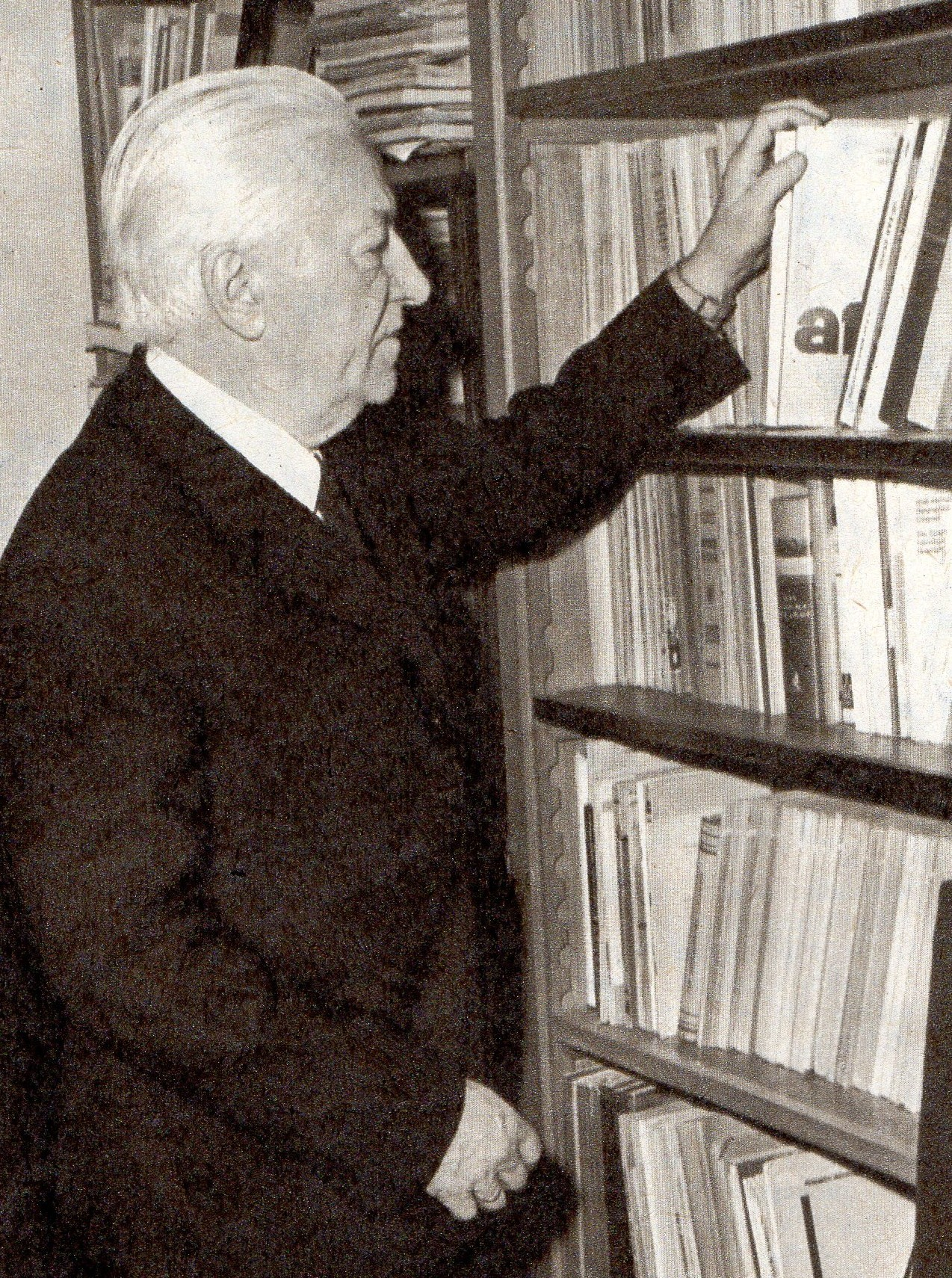
Stanisław Leszczycki

Stanisław Leszczycki (8 May 1907, in Mielec – 17 June 1996, in Warsaw) was a Polish geographer.

He was a professor at the University of Warsaw since 1948 and the Polish Academy of Sciences since 1952 (in each of them he created an Institute of Geography). He was President of the International Geographical Union in 1968–1972, as well as a member of many learned societies and the author of 200 scientific publications on various subdisciplines.
