= Xi'an Shiyou University =

University in Xi'an, China

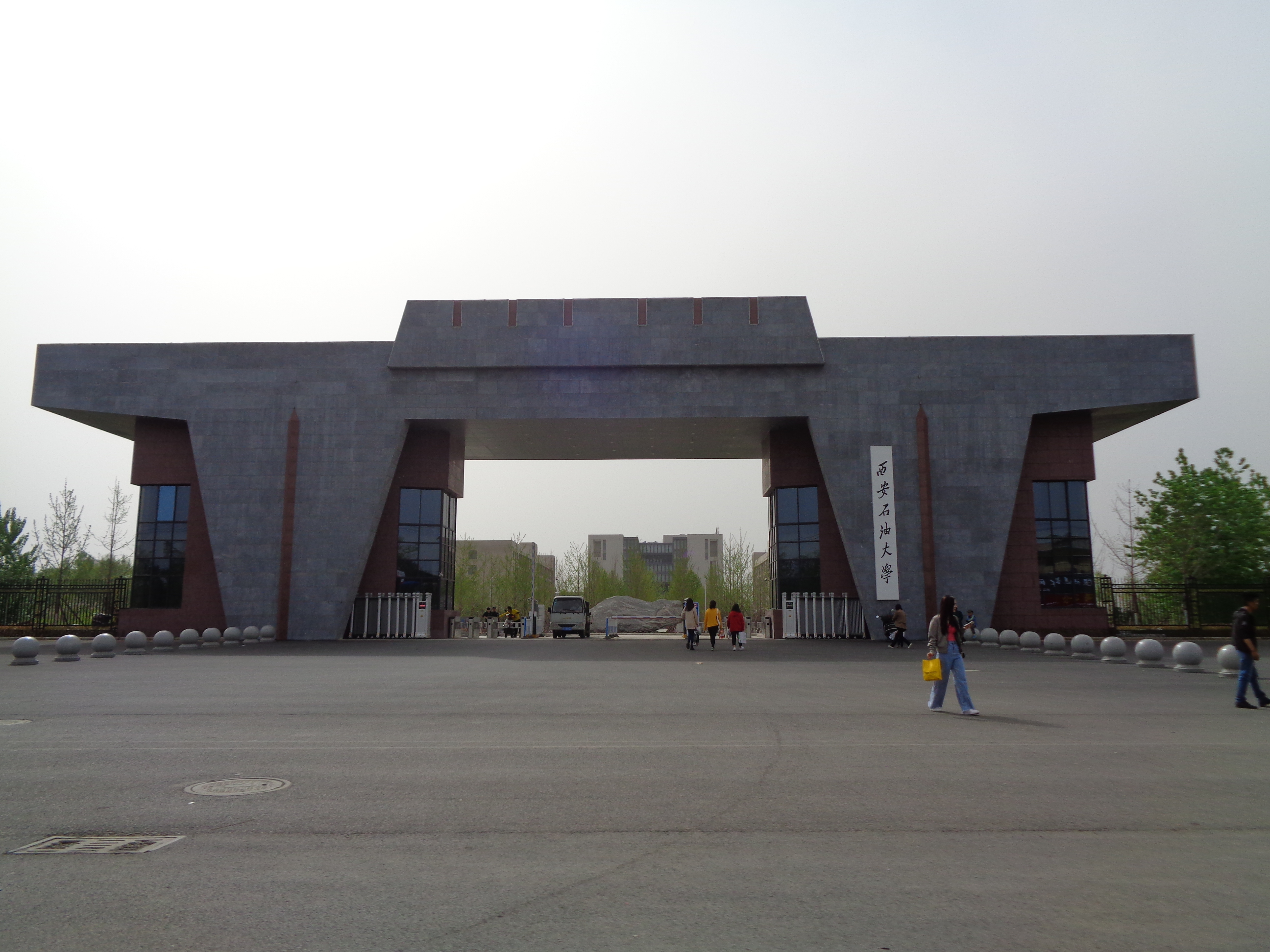
- Other name: Xi'an Petroleum University or Xi'an Petroleum Institute
- Established: 1951
- President: Tiantai Li
- Students: 22,000
- Undergraduates: 16,000
- Postgraduates: 3,300
- Location: Xi'an, Shaanxi, China
- Website: www.xsyu.edu.cn

Xi'an Shiyou University (Chinese: 西安石油大学; pinyin: Xīān Shíyóu Dàxué Abbreviation: XSYU) is a university in Xi'an, China. It also called Xi'an Petroleum University and is the only multi-disciplinary college in Northwest China that is characterized by petroleum and petrochemicals. XSYU is one of five famous petroleum universities in China and owns undergraduate, postgraduate to doctoral student complete training system.

As of June 2018, the school's Yanta, Mingde (South) and Huyi campuses cover about 55 acres. There are more than 1,700 faculty members; more than 1,200 full-time teachers; more than 16,000 undergraduate students; more than 1,900 full-time graduate students; more than 1,400 full-time postgraduate students; and more than 750 international students.

== History ==
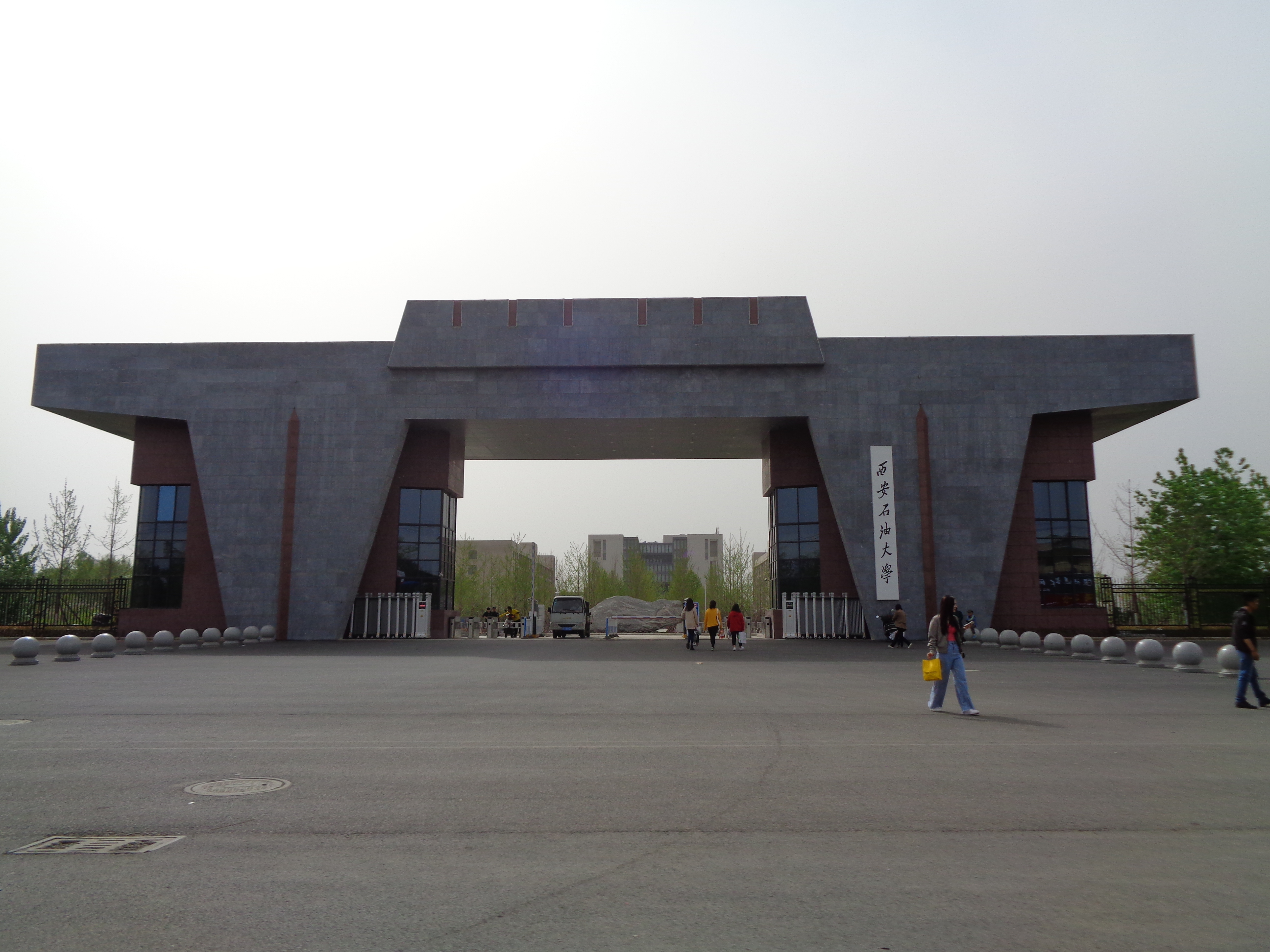
East Gate of Xi'an Petroleum University Huyi Campus

The school began in the Northwest Petroleum Industry College founded in 1951. In 1958, it was upgraded to Xi'an Petroleum Institute. In 1969, the college was closed and turned into factory. In 1980, Xi'an Petroleum Institute reopened. In 2000, it was transferred from the China National Petroleum Corporation to the central and local governments, and was mainly managed by the Shaanxi Provincial People's Government. In 2003, it was renamed Xi'an Petroleum University.

== Faculty ==
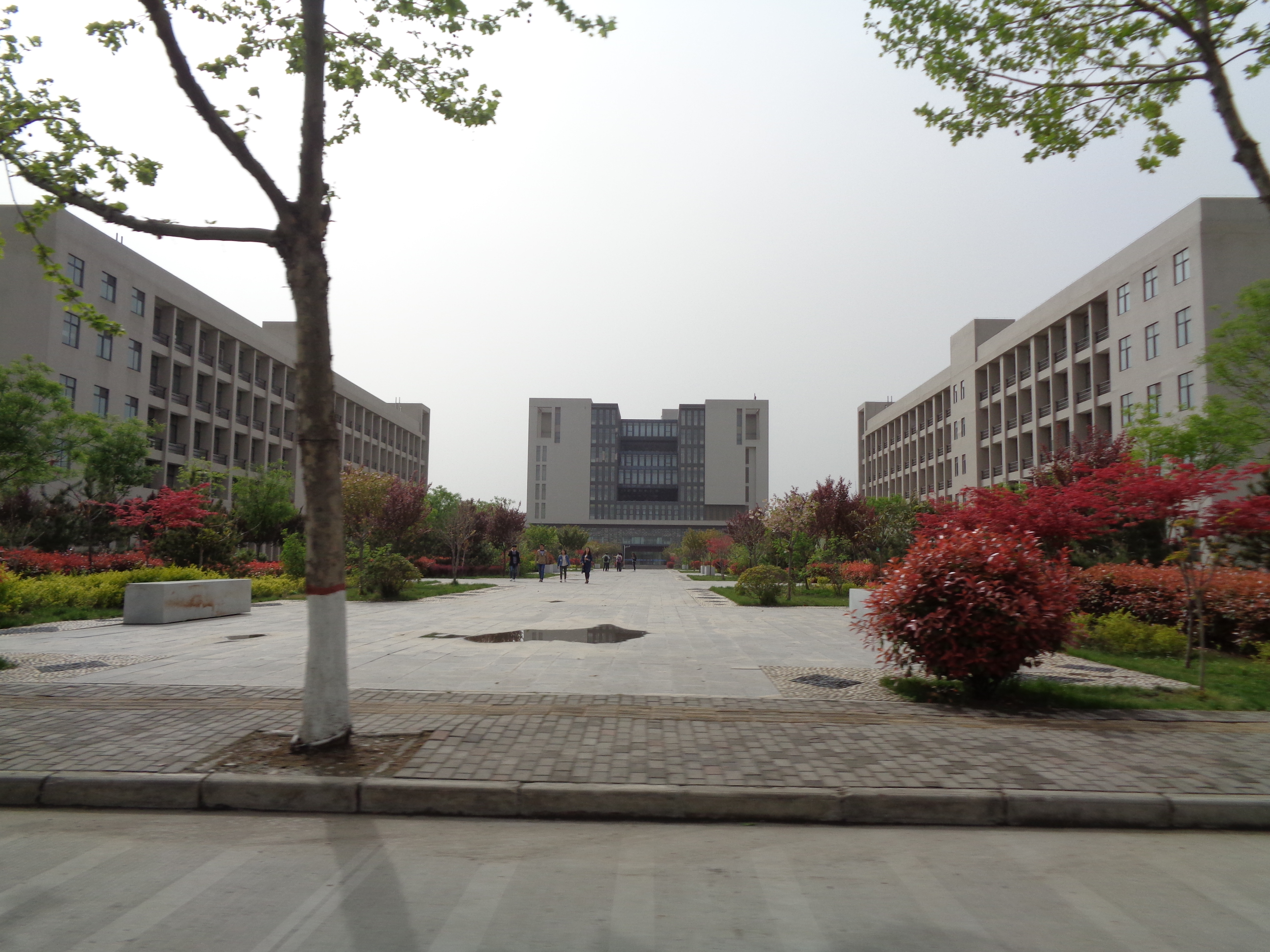
Campus View of Huyi Campus

As of July 2018, the school has more than 1,700 faculty members, more than 1,200 full-time teachers, and nearly 600 senior titles. There are 4 special academicians and more than 40 professors at the second and third levels; there are more than 460 doctoral supervisors and master tutors; and more than 600 teachers with doctoral degrees. There are nearly 40 experts who have outstanding contributions from the state, experts who enjoy special government allowances from the China State Council, national model teachers, national outstanding teachers, national "Thousand Talents Plan" and "National Talents". They have outstanding contributions from Shaanxi Province and are employed in Shaanxi. The "Three Qin Scholars" position in the province, the "Hundred Talents Program" in Shaanxi Province, the "New Century Excellent Talents of the Ministry of Education", the "Three-Five Talent Project" talents in Shaanxi Province, the Shaanxi Provincial Teachers' Morals, the advanced workers in Shaanxi Province, and the advanced individuals in the There are more than 80 talented people such as outstanding teachers, famous teachers and talents in Shaanxi Province.

The 4 special academicians:

Chinese Academy of Sciences: Guowei Zhang

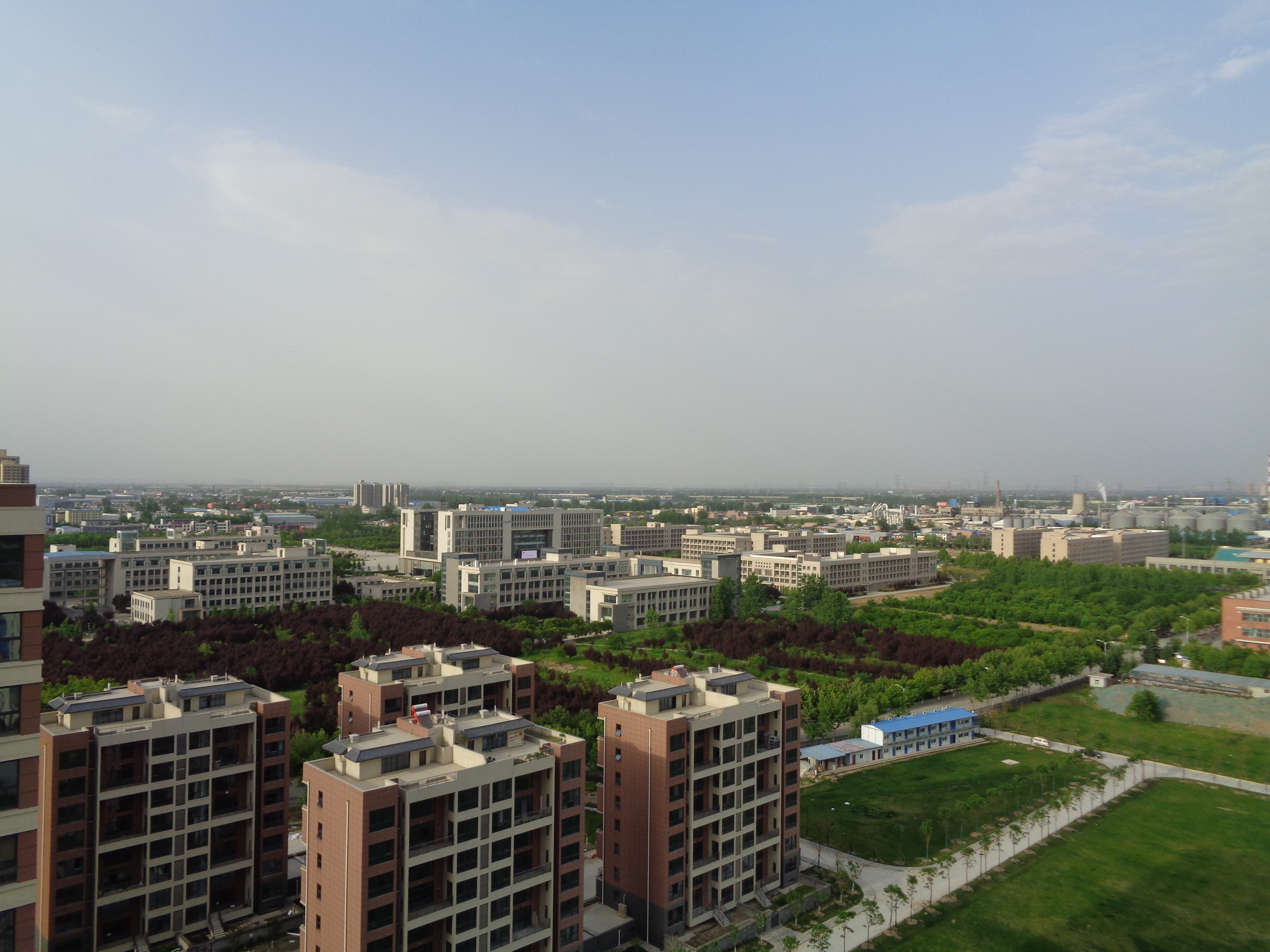
Aerial view of Huyi Campus

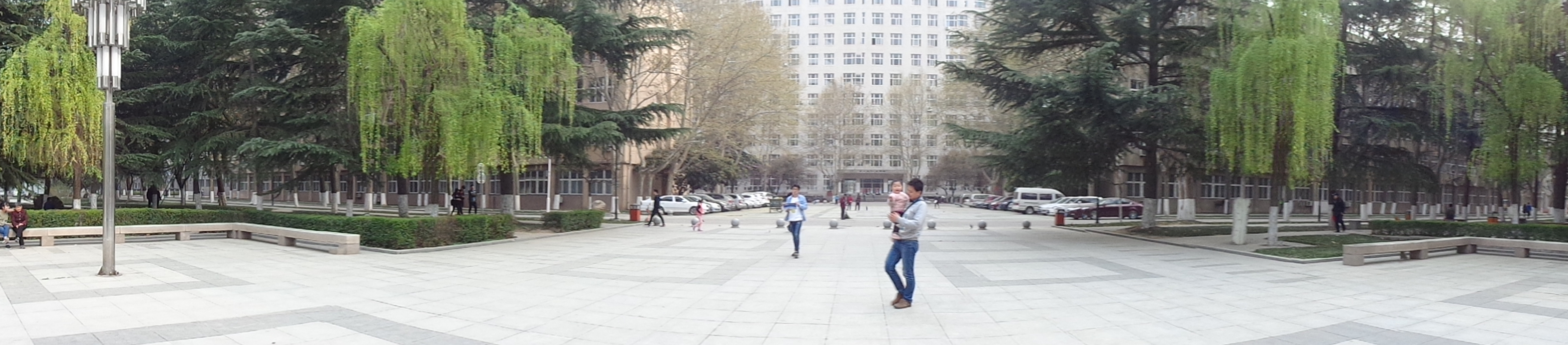
Main Campus

Chinese Academy of Engineering: Helin Li, Pingya Luo, Xinyi Gu

== Academic ==
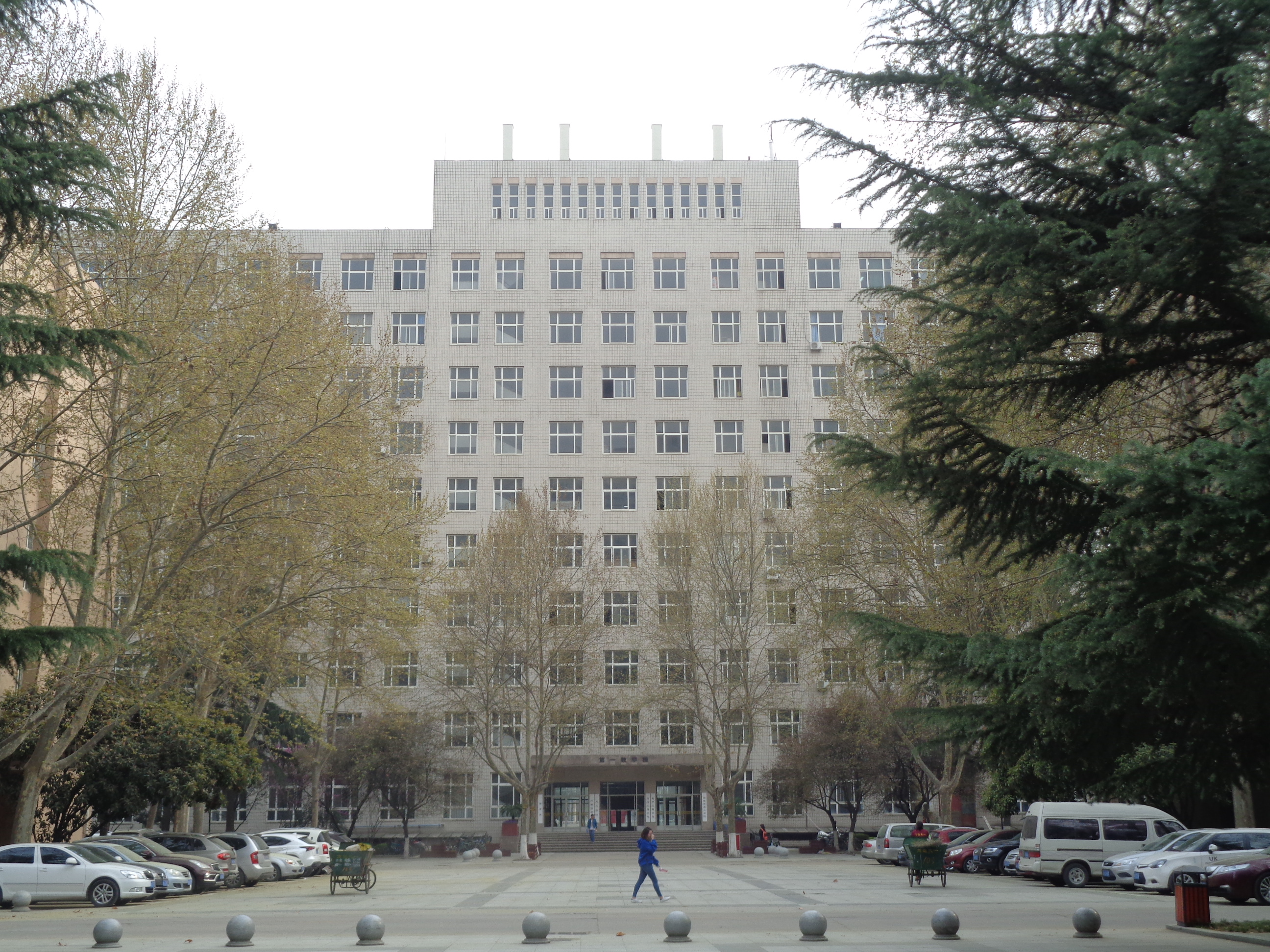
Interior View of Xi'an Petroleum University Main Campus

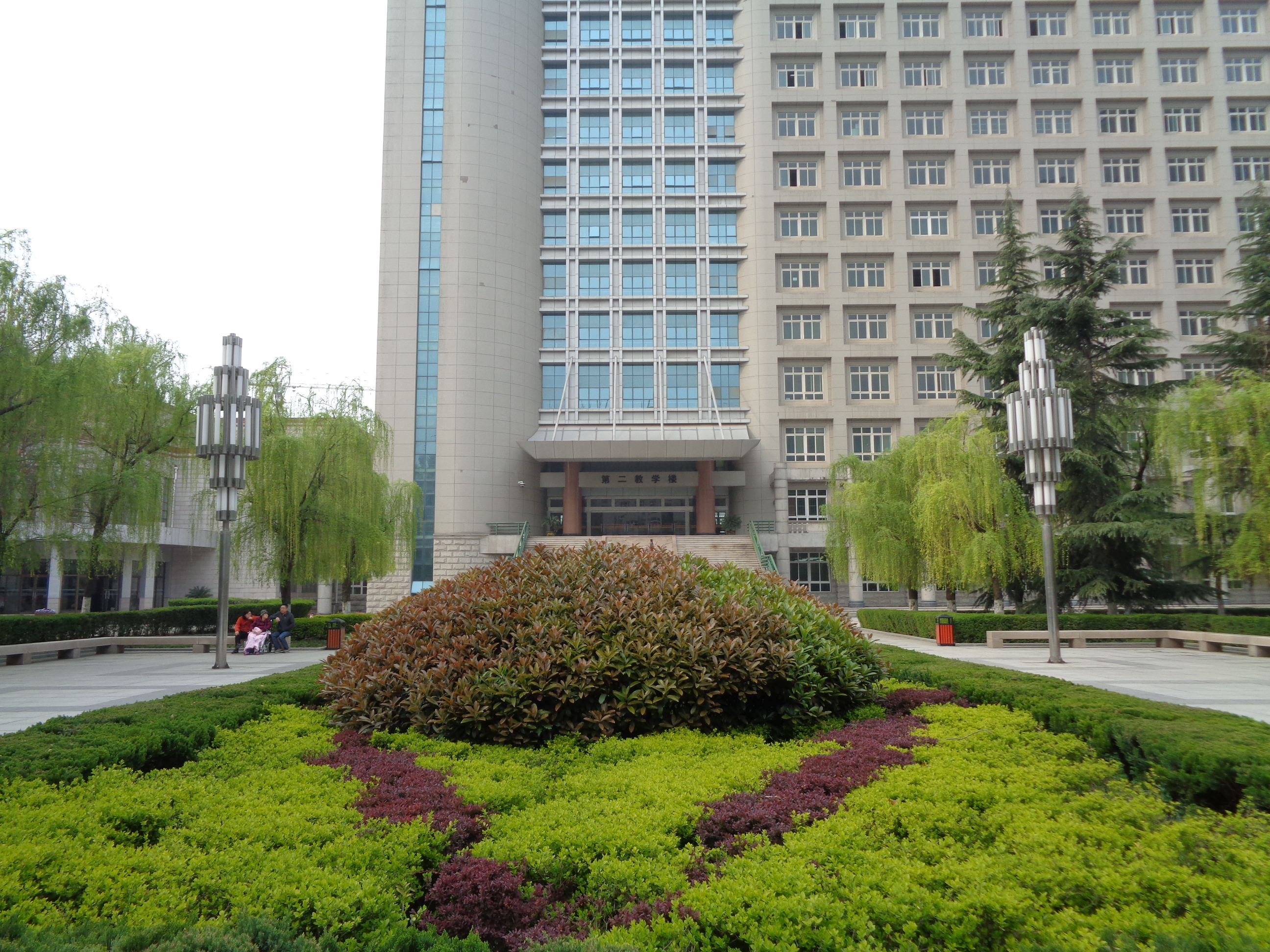
Interior View of Xi'an Petroleum University Main Campus

As of the end of 2017, the school has five national-level specialty programs, five Shaanxi 'first-class professional' construction projects, seven Shaanxi 'first-class professional' cultivation projects, and five national 'excellent engineer education training programs' pilot programs, 10 Shaanxi specialty specialty, five Shaanxi famous brand majors. It won two second prizes of national teaching achievement awards, 22 provincial teaching achievement awards and 10 teaching achievements awards of China Petroleum Education Association. There are two provincial-level online open courses, 19 provincial-level quality courses, 13 provincial-level boutique resource sharing courses, and 15 provincial-level renovation and upgrading resources sharing courses. There are 21 Shaanxi teaching teams, 13 Shaanxi Experimental Teaching Demonstration Centers, two Shaanxi Virtual Simulation Experimental Teaching Centers, 15 Shaanxi Talent Training Model Innovation Experimental Zones, and 13 Ministry of Education Industry-University Cooperation and Education project.

National-level specialty programs:

Computer Science and Technology: Resource Exploration Engineering, Petroleum Engineering, Measurement and Control Technology, Mechanical Design and Automation

National-level university students' off-campus practice education base:

Xi'an Petroleum University-China Petroleum Changqing Petrochemical Company Engineering Practice Education Center

As of June 10, 2014, the school has established cooperation and exchange relations with 43 universities (institutions) in the United States, Canada, Britain, Australia, Germany, Russia and Kazakhstan. The "1+2+1 China-US Talent Training Program" was launched with 13 universities in the United States, and the "2+2 Undergraduate Double Degree" program was held with universities in the United States, Russia, and Korea, and universities in the United States, Britain, and Germany. The "4+1" and "4+2" master's programs and the doctoral scholarship program will be launched to carry out 'exchange student projects' with universities in Russia and the United States. They will also go to the United States, Britain, Germany, France and other countries during the summer and winter. Short-term overseas projects. The school actively carries out education for international students in China, with more than 350 international students from 25 countries. In 2012, the school was approved by the Ministry of Education to undertake Chinese government scholarships for Chinese students to train colleges and universities, and was approved by the Chinese government scholarship for Russian independent enrollment projects.

== Research ==
As of June 10, 2014, the school has 20 provincial and ministerial or above key laboratories (engineering technology research centers) and 5 school-level key laboratories, including the National Engineering Laboratory for exploration and development of low permeability oil and gas fields.

The whole school total won 7 National Award, including 4 National Science and Technology Progress Awards, 2 National Invention Awards and 1 National Science and Technology Research Achievement Award.

== School Address ==
- Address of the main Campus: No.18, East Section of Electronic Road No.2, Yanta District, Xi'an City, Shaanxi Province, China (陕西省西安市雁塔区电子二路东段18号)
- Address of South Campus: No.18, East Zhanba Road, Yanta District, Xi'an City, Shaanxi Province, China (陕西省西安市雁塔区丈八东路)
- Address of Huyi Campus: No.18 Fengjing Avenue, Fengjing Industrial Park, Wuzhu Town, Huyi District, Xi'an City, Shaanxi Province, China (陕西省西安市鄠邑区五竹镇沣京工业园沣京大道18号)

== Alumnus ==
- Chen Zhongshi: Chinese author
