= Ankang University =

University in Ankang, China

Ankang University (Chinese: 安康学院) is a provincial public college in Ankang, Shaanxi, China. It was founded in 1958, but suspended from 1963 to 1978.
