= Xi'an Medical University =

Medical school in Xi'an, China

Xi'an Medical University (Chinese: 西安医学院) is a medical university in Xi'an, Shaanxi, China. The university was founded in 1951.
