= International Geographical Union =

Association of professional geographers

International Geographical Union (IGU)
- Union géographique internationale (UGI)
- Abbreviation: IGU/UGI
- Formation: 1922; 104 years ago
- Founded at: Brussels, Belgium
- Type: INGO
- Location(s): Secretariat: Department of Geography; University of Istanbul; Istanbul, Turkey
- Region served: Worldwide
- Official language: English, French, Spanish
- President: Nathalie Lemarchand
- Secretary-General: Barbaros Gönençgil
- Affiliations: International Science Council
- Website: IGU-Online.org

The International Geographical Union (IGU; French: Union géographique internationale, UGI) is an international geographical society. The first International Geographical Congress was held in Antwerp in 1871. Subsequent meetings led to the establishment of the permanent organization in 1922 in Brussels, Belgium.

The International Geographical Union adheres to the International Science Council (ISC), which it recognizes as the coordinating body for the international organisations of science.

== Objectives ==
The IGU has seven objectives or aims:

1. to promote the study of geographical problems;
2. to initiate and co-ordinate geographical research requiring international co-operation and to promote its scientific discussion and publication;
3. to provide for the participation of geographers in the work of relevant international organizations;
4. to facilitate the collection and diffusion of geographical data and documentation in and between all member countries;
5. to promote International Geographical Congresses, regional conferences and specialized symposia related to the objectives of the Union;
6. to participate in any other appropriate form of international co-operation with the object of advancing the study and application of geography;
7. to promote international standardization or compatibility of methods, nomenclature, and symbols employed in geography.

== Senior officers ==
The following lists contain the senior officers of the IGU from 1922 to present.

=== Presidents ===
- 2024–present (France) Nathalie Lemarchand
- 2021–24 (South Africa) Michael Meadows
- 2016–21 (Japan) Yukio Himiyama
- 2012–16 (Russia) Vladimir Aleksandrovich Kolosov
- 2008–12 (United States) Ronald Francis Abler
- 2006–07 (Mexico) José Palacio-Prieto (acting)
- 2004–06 (Italy) Adalberto Vallega (died in office)
- 2000–04 (Republic of Ireland) Anne Buttimer
- 1996–2000 (Switzerland) Bruno Messerli
- 1992–96 (Kingdom of the Netherlands) Herman Th. Verstappen
- 1988–92 (United States) Roland J. Fuchs
- 1984–88 (Australia) Peter Scott
- 1980–84 (Nigeria) Akin L. Mabogunje
- 1976–80 (United Kingdom) Michael J. Wise
- 1972–76 (France) Jean Dresch
- 1968–72 (Polish People's Republic) Stanisław Leszczycki
- 1964–68 (India) Shiba P. Chatterjee
- 1960–64 (West Germany) Carl Troll
- 1956–60 (Sweden) Hans Wilhelmsson Ahlmann
- 1952–56 (United Kingdom) L. Dudley Stamp
- 1949–52 (United States) George B. Cressey
- 1938–49 (French Fourth Republic) Emmanuel de Martonne
- 1934–38 (United Kingdom) Sir Charles Close
- 1931–34 (United States) Isaiah Bowman
- 1928–31 (French Third Republic) General Robert Bourgeois
- 1924–28 (Italy) General Nicola Vacchelli
- 1922–24 (French Third Republic) Prince Roland Bonaparte

=== Secretaries-General and Treasurers ===
- 2021–present (Turkey) Barbaros Gönençgil
- 2010–20 (South Africa) Michael Meadows
- 2008–10 (South Korea) Yu Woo-ik
- 2000–08 (United States) Ronald Francis Abler
- 1992–2000 (Germany) Eckart Ehlers
- 1984–92 (Canada) Leszek A. Kosiński
- 1976–84 (West Germany) Walther Manshard
- 1968–76 (United States) Chauncy D. Harris
- 1956–68 (Switzerland) Hans Boesch
- 1949–56 (Canada) George H. T. Kimble
- 1940-49 (Belgium) Marguerite Lefèvre
- 1938–40 (Belgium) Paul Michotte
- 1931–38 (French Third Republic) Emmanuel de Martonne
- 1928–31 (Italy) Filippo De Filippi
- 1922–28 (United Kingdom) Sir Charles Close

== Commissions and Task Forces ==
The IGU is organized into a number of commissions and task forces that deal with specific topics.

The commission topics include e.g. specific approaches (e.g. Applied Geography), topics (e.g. Climatology, Health and Environment), methods (e.g. Geographical Information Science), and spatial examples (e.g. Mediterranean Basin). There are also commissions for the International Olympiad and Geographical Education.

The two task forces are "Young and Early-Career Geographers" and "Centennial and Sesquicentennial".

=== IGU-CGE ===
The IGU-CGE (Commission on Geographical Education) focuses on geography education. It is currently headed by co-chairs Clare Brooks (UK) and Chew-Hung Chang (Singapore).

It publishes the IRGEE journal and organizes yearly conferences. The "International Charter on Geographical Education" constitutes an international agreement on different aspects of geography education with global impacts. The 2016 charter features important geography education research questions and policy recommendations. As such the charter is: Convinced that geographical education is indispensable to the development of responsible and active citizens in the present and future world; Conscious that geography can be an informing, enabling and stimulating subject at all levels in education, and contributes to a lifelong enjoyment and understanding of our world; Aware that students require increasing international competence in order to ensure effective cooperation on a broad range of economic, political, cultural and environmental issues in a shrinking world; Concerned that geographical education is neglected in some parts of the world, and lacks structure and coherence in others; Ready to assist colleagues in counteracting geographical illiteracy in all countries of the world. In the 1992 charter there is also information on geographic questions, key concepts, approaches and the selection of spatial examples.

== List of congresses ==
International Geographical Congresses have been held as follows:

Congress number	Year	City
1st	1922	(French Third Republic) Paris
2nd	1928	(United Kingdom) Cambridge
3rd	1931	(French Third Republic) Paris
4th	1934	(Second Polish Republic) Warsaw
5th	1938	(Kingdom of the Netherlands) Amsterdam
6th	1949	(Portugal) Lisbon
7th	1952	(United States) Washington, D.C.
8th	1956	(Brazil) Rio de Janeiro
9th	1960	(Sweden) Stockholm
10th	1964	(United Kingdom) London
11th	1968	(India) New Delhi
12th	1972	(Canada) Montreal
13th	1976	(Soviet Union) Moscow
14th	1980	(Japan) Tokyo
15th	1984	(France) Paris
16th	1988	(Australia) Sydney
17th	1992	(United States) Washington, D.C.
18th	1996	(Kingdom of the Netherlands) The Hague
19th	2000	(South Korea) Seoul
20th	2004	(United Kingdom) Glasgow
21st	2008	(Tunisia) Tunis
22nd	2012	(Germany) Cologne
23rd	2016	(China) Beijing
24th	2021	(Turkey) Istanbul (Note: Originally scheduled for 2020, the Congress was postponed by one year due to the COVID-19 pandemic.)
*	2022	(France) Paris (Note: Extraordinary Congress for IGU Centenary.)
25th	2024	(Republic of Ireland) Dublin
26th	2028	(Australia) Melbourne
27th	2032	(Spain)

* Extraordinary Congress
