= Organic Geochemistry =

- Discipline: Organic geochemistry
- Language: English
- Edited by: Bart van Dongen, Elizabeth Minor, Clifford Walters

Publication details
- History: 1977–present
- Publisher: Elsevier
- Frequency: Monthly
- Open access: Hybrid
- Impact factor: 2.6 (2023)

Standard abbreviations
- ISO 4: Org. Geochem.

Indexing
- CODEN: ORGEDE
- ISSN: 0146-6380
- LCCN: 78644388
- OCLC no.: 3637170

Links
- Journal homepage; Online archive

Organic Geochemistry is a monthly peer-reviewed scientific journal published by Elsevier covering research on all aspects of organic geochemistry. It is an official journal of the European Association of Organic Geochemists. The editors-in-chief are Bart van Dongen (University of Manchester), Elizabeth Minor (University of Minnesota Duluth), and Clifford Walters (University of Texas at Austin).

== Abstracting and indexing ==
The journal is abstracted and indexed in:

- Aquatic Sciences and Fisheries Abstracts
- CAB Abstracts
- Chemical Abstracts Service
- Current Contents/Physics, Chemical & Earth Sciences
- EBSCO databases
- Ei Compendex
- Elsevier Biobase
- GEOBASE
- PASCAL
- Science Citation Index Expanded
- Scopus

According to the Journal Citation Reports, the journal has a 2023 impact factor of 2.6.

== Notable articles ==
According to the Web of Science, the journal's two most cited papers (as of 22 June 2013) are:

- Yunker, M. B.; Macdonald, R. W.; Vingarzan, R.; Mitchell, R. H.; Goyette, D.; Sylvestre, S. (2002). "PAHs in the Fraser River basin: A critical appraisal of PAH ratios as indicators of PAH source and composition". Org. Geochem. 33 (4): 489–515. Bibcode:2002OrGeo..33..489Y. doi:10.1016/S0146-6380(02)00002-5. (cited 766 times)
- Volkman, J. K. (1986). "A review of sterol markers for marine and terrigenous organic-matter". Org. Geochem. 9 (2): 83–99. Bibcode:1986OrGeo...9...83V. doi:10.1016/0146-6380(86)90089-6. (cited 722 times)
