= Yulin University =

University in Yulin, Shaanxi, China

Coordinates: 38°17′33.5″N 109°43′26.34″E

- 榆林大学
- Motto: 读书勿忘救国，救国勿忘读书
- Type: Public
- Established: 1923
- President: Fu Feng (付峰)
- Party Secretary: Kang Wei (康伟)
- Total staff: 1203 (April 2026)
- Undergraduates: 13,000 (April 2026)
- Postgraduates: 1,000 (April 2026)
- Location: Yulin, Shaanxi, China
- Campus: multiple sites
- Website: www.yulinu.edu.cn

Yulin University (Chinese: 榆林大学) is a public university. It is located in Yulin, Shaanxi, China.

Yulin University offers degrees in pipe engineering, linguistics, science, agriculture, law and other disciplines. Yulin University is a full-time system and comprehensive regular college.

== History ==
It converted from a college to a university in 2003. It was founded in 1958 as Suide Normal College.

== Facilities ==
The school covers an area of 640 thousand square meters (160 acres), with building area of 457 thousand square meters (113 acres), teaching equipment worth 89,460 thousand yuan. The school hosts 958 faculty members and 14,869 full-time students, including 11,886 undergraduates, offering 46 undergraduate professional majors.
