= Charles Close =

British geographer and surveyor (1865–1952)

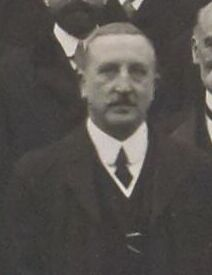
- Arden-Close in 1913
- Born: 10 August 1865; Jersey
- Died: 19 December 1952 (aged 87); Winchester, Hampshire, England
- Military career
- Allegiance: United Kingdom
- Branch: British Army
- Service years: 1884–1922
- Rank: Colonel
- Commands: Ordnance Survey
- Conflicts: World War I
- Awards: Knight Commander of the Order of the British Empire; Companion of the Order of the Bath Companion of the Order of St Michael and St George; Fellow of the Royal Society

Colonel Sir Charles Frederick Arden-Close, KBE CB CMG FRS (10 August 1865 – 19 December 1952) was a British geographer and surveyor. He was Director General of the Ordnance Survey from 1911 to 1922. His insistence on attention to detail saw the improvement of many attitudes and methods at the Ordnance Survey. Close's planning saw the production of many maps now viewed as pinnacles in the classic period of map making. He was born Charles Frederick Close and changed his surname to Arden-Close in 1938 so as to comply with a bequest.

He was born in Jersey, the eldest of the eleven children of Major-General Frederick Close (1830–1899) and his second wife Lydia Ann Stevens. Close attended the Royal Military Academy at Woolwich where military engineering and artillery were taught. He excelled at mathematics. After receiving his commission in the Royal Engineers in 1884, he saw service in the School of Military Engineering at Chatham, Gibraltar and India.

In 1889 Close was posted to the survey of India where he carried out topographic work in Burma and triangulation in Mandalay. There was a further posting to eastern Nigeria, to survey the border with the German Cameroon. After appointment to the Ordnance Survey he carried out much work in central, eastern and southern Africa. Close led a small surveying unit in the Second Boer War, and returned to Chatham in 1902 to become chief instructor of surveying at the School of Military Engineering. His Text Book of Topographical and Geographical Surveying published in 1905 became the standard textbook on the subject.

Close served as head of MO4, the Geographical Section of the General Staff, at the War Office until 1911, when he handed over to Lieutenant-Colonel Walter Coote Hedley.

In 1911 Close was appointed Director General of the Ordnance Survey, a post he held until 1922. He introduced more rigorous scientific methods at the Ordnance Survey and proceeded with a second geodetic levelling of the United Kingdom. He was intent on producing one-inch maps (Scale = 1:63,360 or 1 inch = 1 mile) of revolutionary appearance, the first of these for Killarney district (Ireland was then part of the UK) used colour printing and precise printing methods. Because of the high cost of production Close had to compromise his aims and a simpler style was adopted. This design set the standard for subsequent one-inch series.

Charles Close married in 1913 and had two sons and a daughter. He was knighted in 1918, in recognition of the Ordnance Survey's efforts during World War I during which over 30 million maps were produced. He was elected a Fellow of the Royal Society in 1919. Upon retirement in 1922 he became secretary of the International Geographical Congress. Close was also a long-serving Fellow of the Royal Geographical Society and in 1927 was awarded their Victoria Gold Medal and elected President (1927–30).

Close changed his surname to Arden-Close by deed poll in August 1938. He died in Winchester registration district of Hampshire on 19 December 1952, aged 87.

The Charles Close Society for the Study of Ordnance Survey Maps was founded in 1980.
