= Bouck =

Bouck may refer to:

== Given name ==
- Peter Bouck Borst (1826–1882), American politician
- Bouck White (1874–1951), American novelist

== Surname ==
- Gabriel Bouck (1828–1904), American Representative from Wisconsin
- Jeff Bouck, drummer for Tripping Daisy
- Joseph Bouck (1788–1858), American Representative from New York
- Lyle Bouck (1923–2016), American soldier
- Tyler Bouck (born 1980), Canadian hockey player
- William C. Bouck (1786–1859), American politician from New York

== Places ==
- Bouck's Falls, Fulton, New York, US
- Bouck's Island, Breakabeen, New York, US
- Boucks Island, Schoharie County, New York, US
