= Max V. Shaul State Park =

State park in Schoharie County, New York

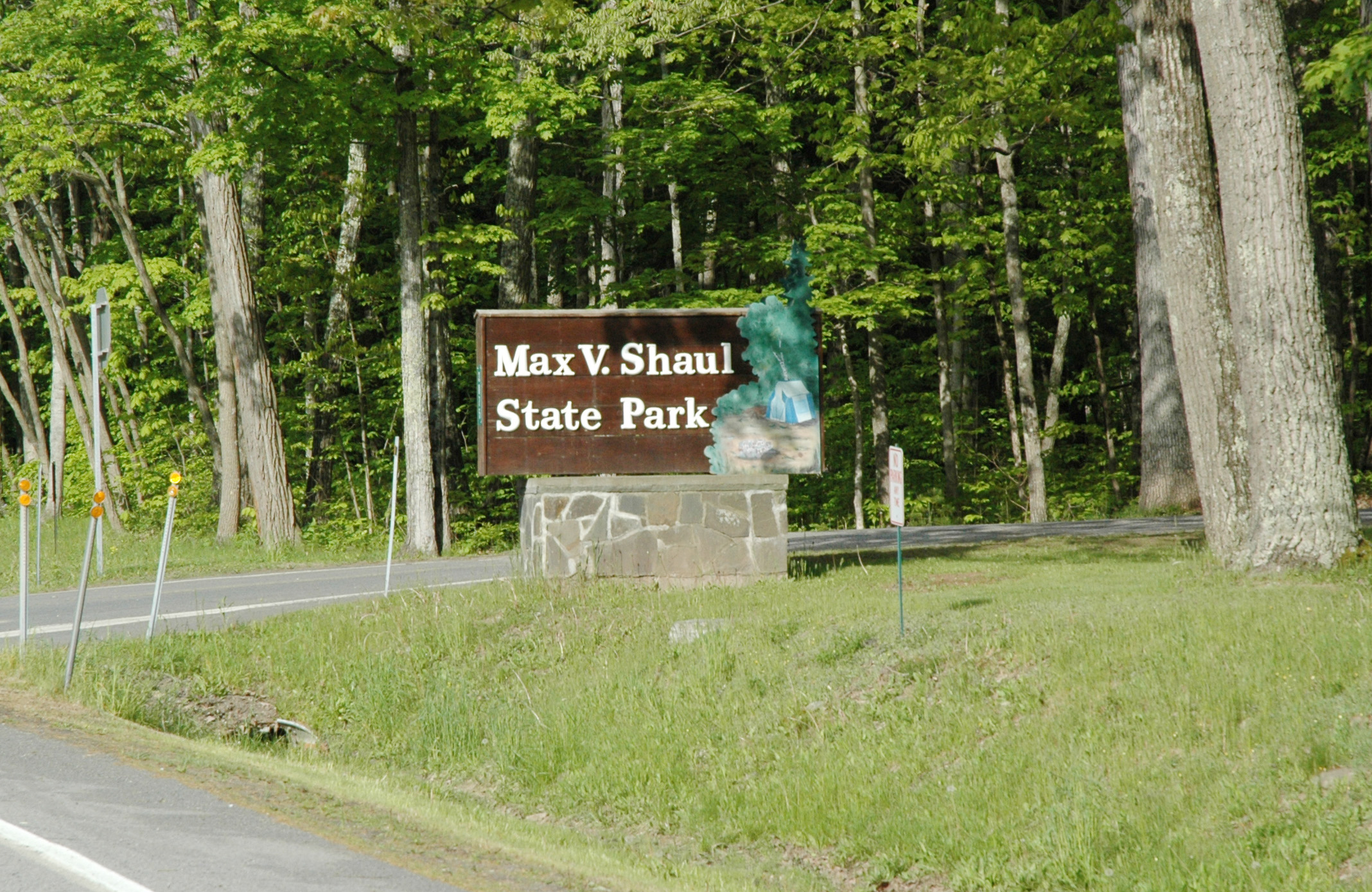
- Max V. Shaul State Park's entrance.

- Location within New York
- Type: State park
- Location: Route 30; Fultonham, New York
- Nearest city: Fultonham, New York
- Coordinates: 42°32′53″N 74°24′40″W
- Area: 70 acres (0.28 km^{2})
- Created: 1959
- Operator: New York State Office of Parks, Recreation and Historic Preservation
- Visitors: 25,885 (in 2014)
- Open: All year
- Camp sites: 30
- Website: Max V. Shaul State Park

Max V. Shaul State Park is a 70-acre (0.28 km^{2}) state park in Schoharie County, New York, United States. The park is located in Schoharie Valley between Breakabeen and Fultonham in the Town of Fulton, within sight of Vroman's Nose.

== History ==
New York State made the initial purchase of land that was to become the park in 1958. Originally named Toepath Mountain Picnic Area and Campsite, the park opened on May 28, 1959.

== Park description ==
Max V. Shaul State Park features a softball field, a playground, fishing (at Panther and Schoharie creeks), picnic grounds, and cooking and camping sites. Cross-country ski trails are available in the winter. Camping is available at 30 tent and trailer sites, and campers at Max V. Shaul State Park are permitted free access to nearby Mine Kill State Park during their stay.

The park is located on Route 30, and the southern entrance of Old Route 30 is at the park.
