= Schoharie Valley =

Valley in New York State, United States

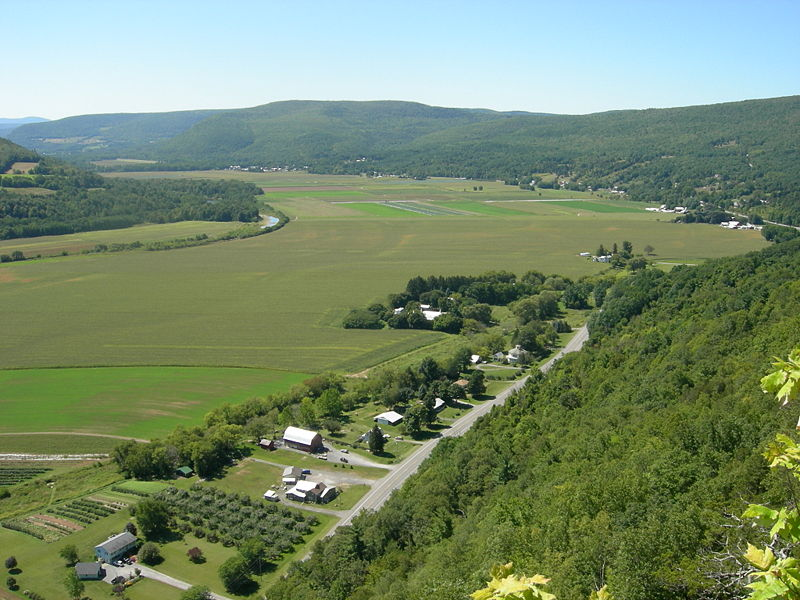
- View westward from Vroman's Nose in the Schoharie Valley

Geography
- Location: Schoharie County, New York
- Country: United States
- State: New York
- Population centers: Middleburgh, Schoharie, Fulton, Breakabeen
- Coordinates: 42.53°N 74.41°W
- River: Schoharie Creek
- Interactive map of Schoharie Valley

The Schoharie Valley is a corridor that runs through Schoharie County from Schoharie, New York to Gilboa, New York.

== Geography ==
The Schoharie Valley is made up of plains surrounding the Schoharie Creek. Within the Schoharie Valley are the towns of Middleburgh, Schoharie, Fulton, and the Hamlet of Breakabeen.

Vroman's Nose is an isolated mound of bedrock created by glaciers fifty thousand years ago.

The Valley is cut in the middle by NYS Route 30.

== History ==
The Schoharie Valley was colonized by the British in the early eighteenth century. However, the majority of the settlers were Dutch or Germans.

The Schoharie Valley was famous for its role in the American Revolution. Battles in the Valley included those in Breakabeen, at the Old Stone Fort, and the Battle of the Lower Fort. The Valley was ransacked by Tories and loyal Indian forces during the latter portion of the war.

The Schoharie Valley's main fortress, the Old Stone Fort was used as an armory during the American Civil War.

The valley was once served by the Schoharie Valley Railroad and the Middleburgh-Schoharie Railroad.

== Economy ==
Today, the prime industry of the Schoharie Valley is farming. The NYS Power Authority also has a hydroelectric power plant in Blenheim, New York. There is also some tourism, primarily to the Old Stone Fort, Dr. Best Museum, Vroman's Nose, and the Old Blenheim Bridge.

== Notable residents ==
- Timothy Murphy, Revolutionary War Hero.
- William C. Bouck, New York Governor.
- Gabriel Bouck, Wisconsin Congressman.
- Joseph Bouck, New York Congressman.
- John McGiver, actor.
- Nicole Sullivan, actress.
