= Lyman Sanford =

American judge and militia officer from New York (1811–1881)

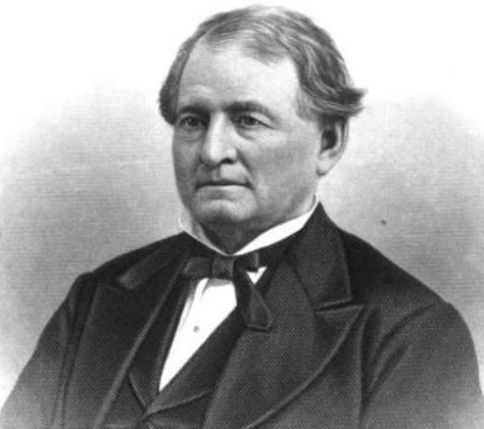
- From 1882's History of Schoharie County, New York

Judge of Schoharie County, New York
- In office 1 January 1856 – 1 January 1864
- Preceded by: Demosthenes Lawyer
- Succeeded by: William C. Lamont

Adjutant General of New York
- In office 4 January 1843 – 4 July 1843
- Preceded by: Rufus King
- Succeeded by: Archibald C. Niven

Personal details
- Born: 13 November 1811 Greenville, New York, US
- Died: 14 March 1881 (aged 69) Middleburgh, New York, US
- Resting place: Upper Middleburgh Cemetery, Middleburgh, New York, US
- Party: Democratic
- Other political affiliations: Democratic-Republican
- Spouse: Ann Eve Bouck (m. 1837–1881)
- Children: 5
- Education: Union College
- Profession: Attorney

Lyman Sanford (13 November 1811 – 14 March 1881) was an American attorney, judge, and militia officer from Middleburgh, New York. Active in politics, first as a Democratic-Republican, and later as a Democrat, he served as Adjutant General of New York in 1843, and judge of Schoharie County, New York from 1856 to 1863.

== Early life ==
Lyman Sanford was born in Greenville, Greene County, New York on 13 November 1811, a son of Truman Sanford and Silence (Tuttle) Sanford. He was raised and educated in Greenville and graduated from Greenville Academy. In 1827, he began studies at Union College, from which he graduated Phi Beta Kappa with a Bachelor of Arts degree in 1831. While in college, he became a member of the Philomathean Society and the Kappa Alpha Society. He taught school for a year after his college graduation, then studied law with his brother-in-law Erastus Barnes in New York City.

Sanford finished his legal studies with Robert McClellan of Middleburgh, was admitted to the bar in 1835, and practiced in New York City with his brother Mitchell. Sanford was a member of the Democratic-Republican Party, and participated in activities including campaign rallies and ward meetings. In 1837, he married Ann Eve Bouck, daughter of William C. Bouck; they were married until his death and were the parents of five children. In 1839, Sanford moved to Middleburgh, where he resumed the practice of law.

== Career ==
In January 1840, Sanford formed a law partnership with Peter S. Danforth, which they maintained until January 1856. In 1843, Sanford's father-in-law was serving as governor, and appointed him Adjutant General of New York. In 1845, Sanford succeeded Bouck as financial agent and treasurer of the Hartwick Seminary (now Hartwick College), and he continued in this position until 1880. He served on the school's board of trustees from 1859 until his death, and was the board's president from 1874 to 1880. By now a Democrat, he continued his involvement in politics, including serving as a delegate to state party conventions. In 1855, Sanford was elected judge of Schoharie County, and he served from 1 January 1856 to 1 January 1864.

After leaving the bench, Sanford resumed the practice of law; in January 1866 he formed a partnership with William E. Thorne, which continued until Sanford's death. Sanford was an original incorporator of the Middleburgh and Schoharie Railroad and served on its board of directors and as treasurer and vice president. He was also an incorporator of the Middleburgh and Schoharie Plank Road, and served on the board of directors and as treasurer. Sanford died in Middleburgh on 14 March 1881. He was buried at Upper Middleburgh Cemetery in Middleburgh.
