= New York State Route 30 =

Highway in New York

New York State Route 30
- NY 30 highlighted in red, and former alignments maintained as reference routes in blue

Route information
- Maintained by NYSDOT and the city of Amsterdam
- Length: 300.71 mi (483.95 km)
- Existed: 1930–present

Major junctions
- South end: Future I-86 / NY 17 in Hancock
- NY 28 at Pepacton Reservoir; US 20 in Duanesburg; I-90 / New York Thruway / NY 5S in Amsterdam; NY 5 in Amsterdam; NY 8 in Speculator; NY 28 at Indian Lake; US 11 in Malone
- North end: R-138 at the Canadian border in Constable

Location
- Country: United States
- State: New York
- Counties: Delaware, Schoharie, Schenectady, Montgomery, Fulton, Hamilton, Franklin, St. Lawrence

Highway system
- New York Highways; Interstate; US; State; Reference; Parkways
← NY 29A	→ NY 30A

New York State Route 30 (NY 30) is a state highway in the central part of New York in the United States. It extends for 300.71 miles (483.95 km) from an interchange with NY 17 (Future Interstate 86) in the Southern Tier to the US–Canada border in the state's North Country, where it continues into Quebec as Route 138. On a regional level, the route serves to connect the Catskill Park to the Adirondack Park. In the latter, NY 30 is known as the Adirondack Trail. Aside from the state parks, the route serves the city of Amsterdam (where it meets the New York State Thruway) and several villages.

NY 30 was assigned in the 1930 renumbering of state highways in New York to most of its modern routing south of Wells, replacing a series of designations that had been assigned to the highway in the 1920s. The portion of what is now NY 30 north of Speculator was initially part of NY 10. When that route was truncated to Arietta c. 1960, NY 30 was extended northward over NY 10's former alignment by way of an overlap with NY 8.

== Route description ==
The New York State Department of Transportation (NYSDOT) maintains all but 0.97 miles (1.56 km) of NY 30's 301-mile (484 km) alignment. The only section not maintained by the state is located in the city of Amsterdam, where the route is locally maintained from Prospect Street (two blocks north of NY 67) to the northern city line.

=== Hancock to Schoharie ===
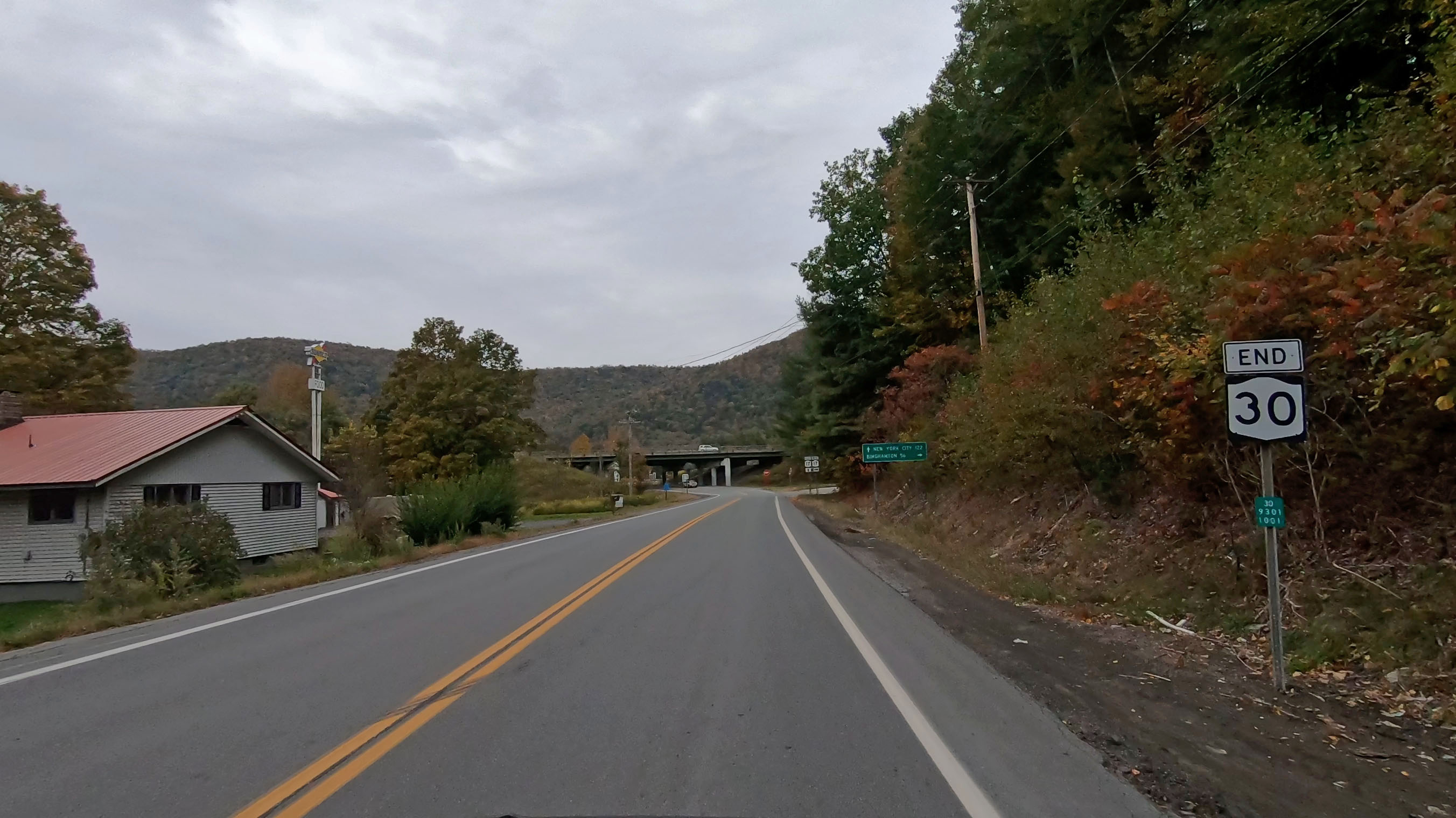
NY 30 southern terminus with NY 17 interchange visible

NY 30 begins at an interchange with NY 17 in the town of Hancock adjacent to the confluence of the East Branch of the Delaware River and the Beaverkill River. The route follows the East Branch northeast to Downsville, where it meets NY 206. NY 206 follows NY 30 across the East Branch into Catskill Park, where the routes split near Brock Mountain. NY 30 exits the park, runs along the south side of the Pepacton Reservoir, before crossing over to the north side of the river. Near Margaretville, NY 30 briefly overlaps NY 28 before turning northward toward Roxbury, where the route passes the John Burroughs Memorial State Historic Site. New York Governor David Paterson designated the stretch of NY 30 within Delaware County the "David C. Brinkerhoff Memorial Highway", after the New York State Trooper who was slain in pursuit of Travis Trimm near the village on April 25, 2007.

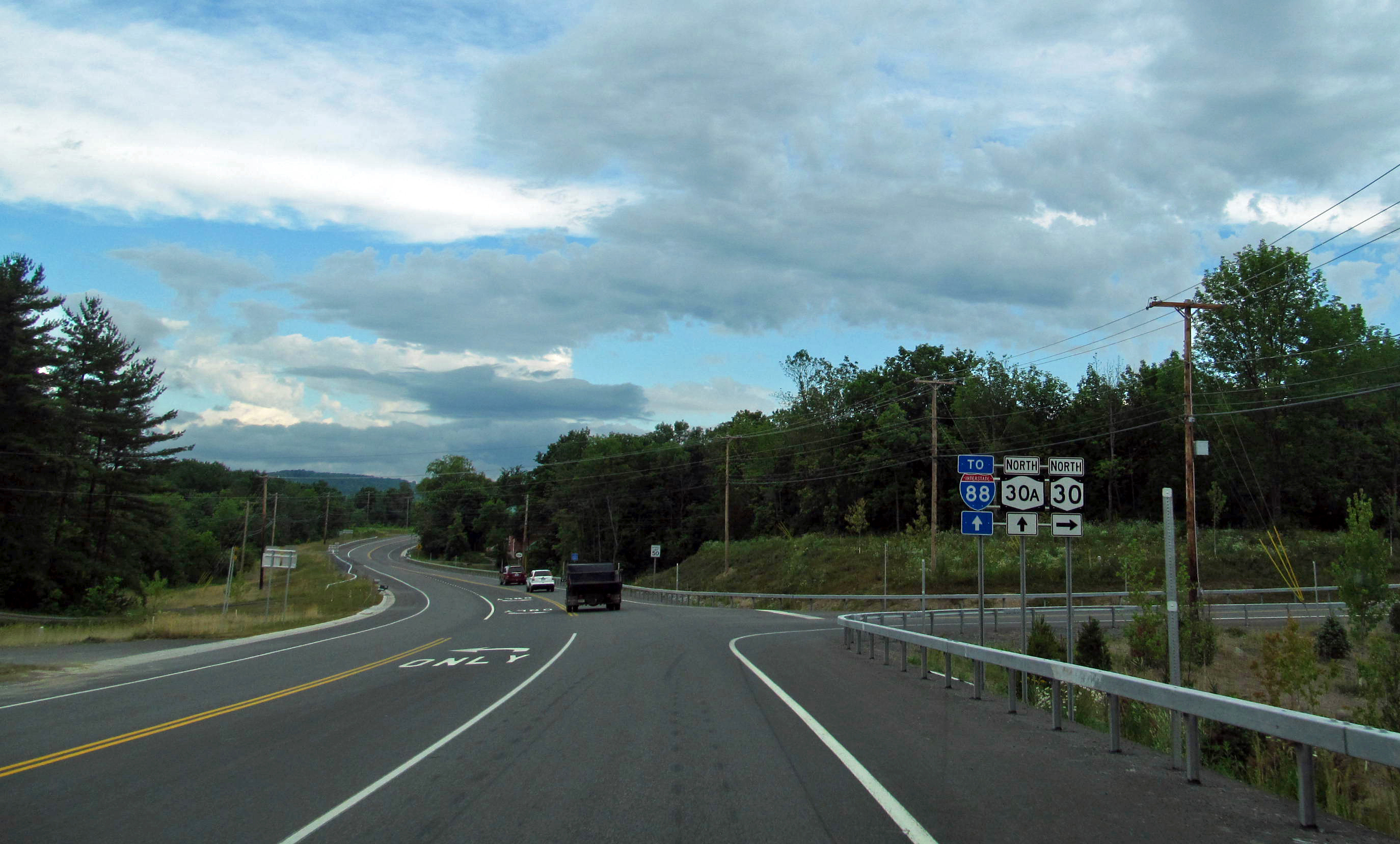
Northbound NY 30 approaching the southern terminus of NY 30A

From Roxbury, NY 30 follows the East Branch to Grand Gorge in northeastern Delaware County, where the East Branch comes to an end amidst the mountains. NY 30, meanwhile, intersects NY 23 in the center of the hamlet.

North of Grand Gorge, NY 30 crosses into Schoharie County and intersects NY 990V, one of four reference routes in New York signed as a touring route, near the northeastern edge of the Schoharie Reservoir in Gilboa. From NY 990V northward, NY 30 follows the Schoharie Creek through Schoharie County to Middleburgh, where it intersects NY 145. To the north in Schoharie, NY 30 meets NY 443 before splitting into NY 30 and NY 30A north of the village, with Schoharie Creek largely following NY 30A. While NY 30A connects to Interstate 88 (I-88) by way of an interchange a short distance to the north, NY 30 has no connection to the freeway. Just past I-88, NY 30 intersects NY 7. Shortly after passing NY 7, NY 30 enters Schenectady County.

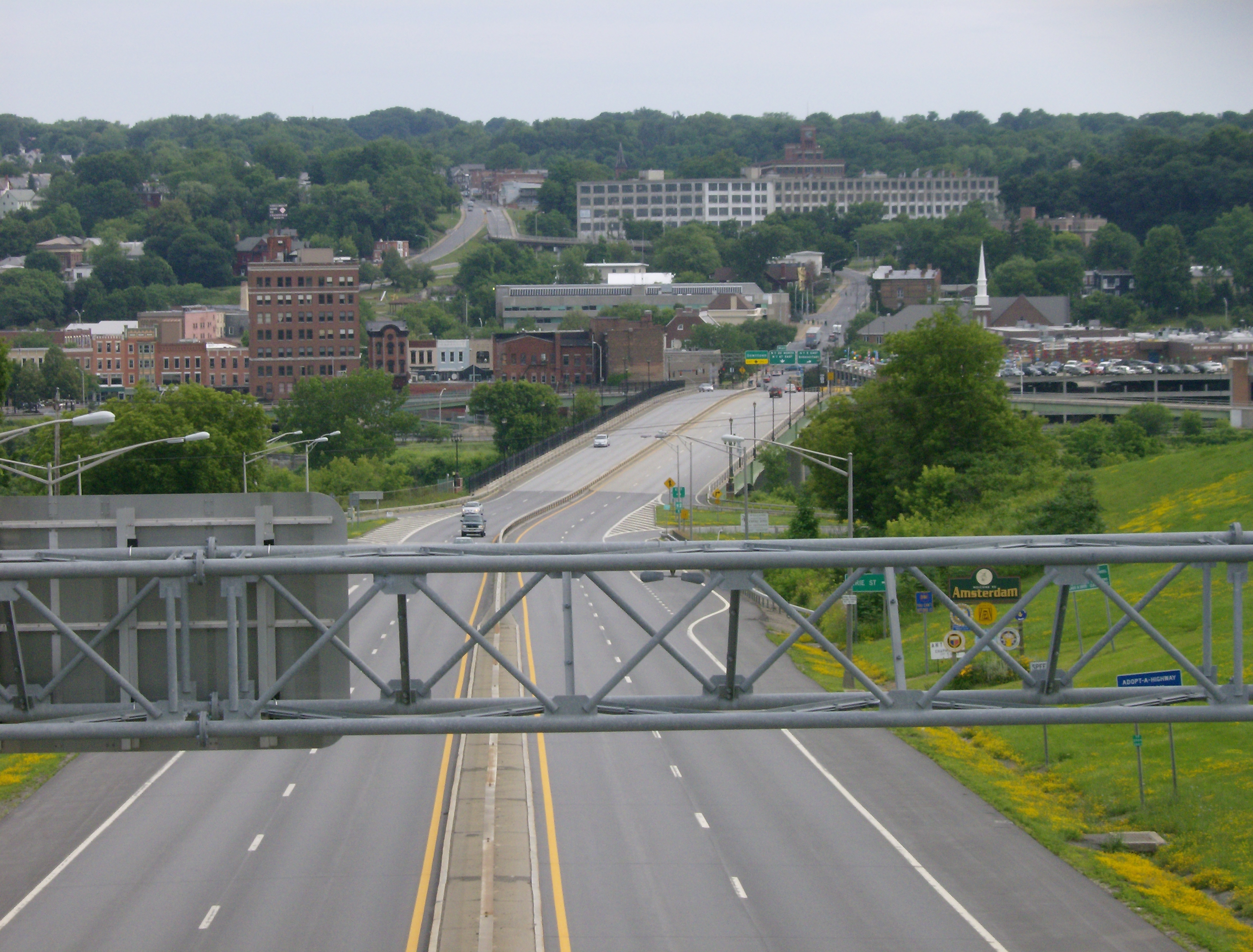
NY 30 approaching Amsterdam with Market Street hill visible in the background

=== Schoharie to Adirondack Park ===
In Schenectady County, Schoharie Creek breaks from NY 30A and returns to the vicinity of NY 30 as it intersects U.S. Route 20 (US 20) in Esperance. From Esperance northward, the creek becomes roughly equidistant from both NY 30 and NY 30A as all three entities cross into Montgomery County. Near the northeastern corner of the county, NY 30 enters the city of Amsterdam. The route meets the New York State Thruway (I-90) and NY 5S via separate interchanges before heading downhill as a four-lane divided highway approaching the Mohawk River (here part of the Erie Canal). Historically, the bridge over the river was a straight line to Market Street, which is visible as one approaches northbound. Segments of downtown Market Street remain in use today. With the 1977 creation of the Amsterdam Mall, NY 30, together with NY 5 and NY 67, were re-routed onto splits. After the splits rejoin, NY 30 continues on Market Street and leaves the city and, for all purposes, the county.

In adjacent Fulton County, NY 30 crosses NY 29 near Broadalbin, then curves gently to the east after an intersection with County Route 155 (CR 155), a historical routing of NY 29. 0.25 miles (0.40 km), NY 30 turns left toward Mayfield; CR 155 continues eastward. The concurrency between the two routes is unsigned.

NY 30 historically followed School Street through the village of Mayfield. The new routing has it heading toward Riceville, where NY 30A rejoins NY 30. Here, the Adirondack Trail begins as NY 30 turns right, following the right-of-way of NY 30A into Adirondack Park shortly before entering Mayfield.

=== Adirondack Park and Franklin County ===
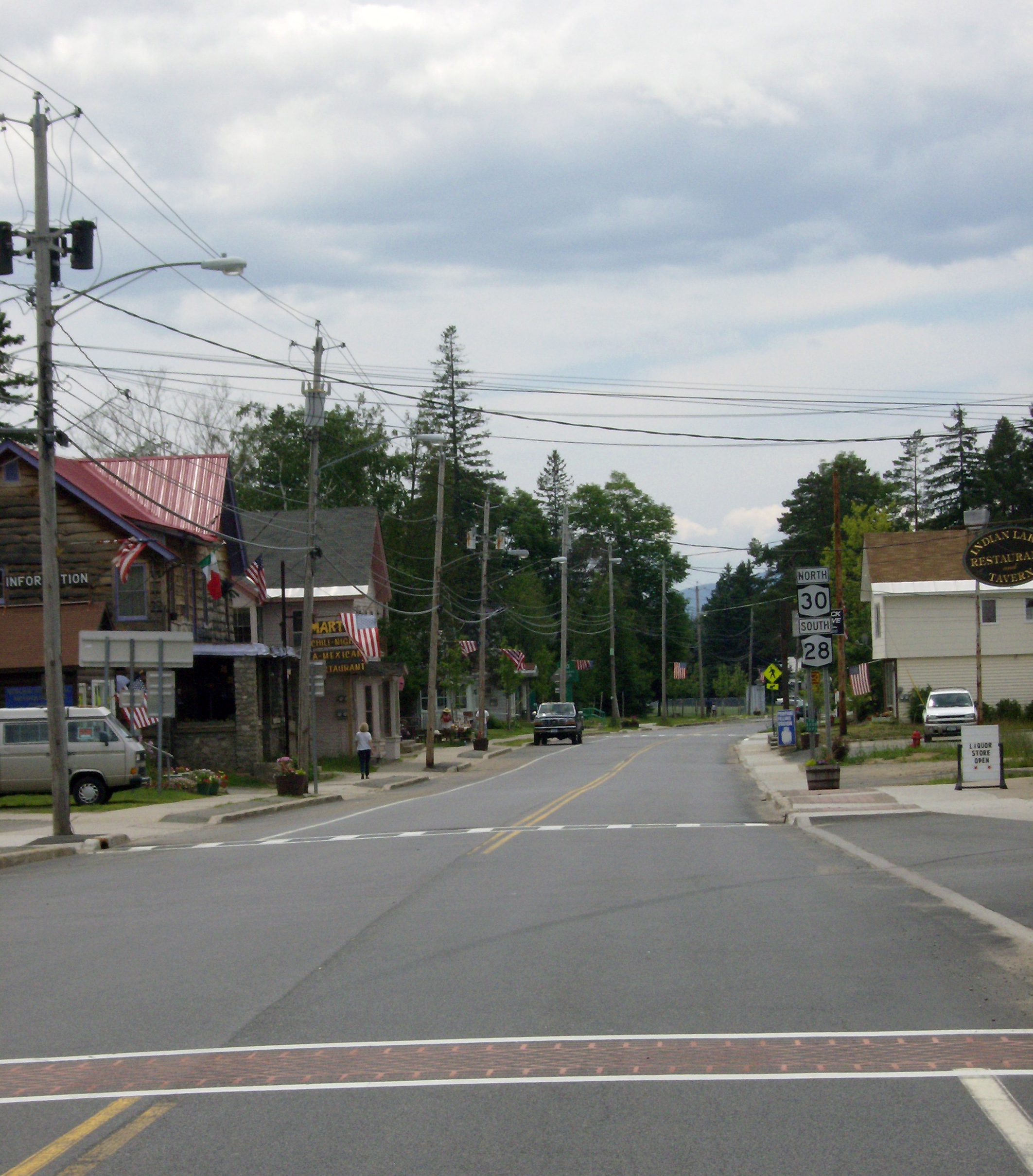
NY 30 overlaps NY 28 through the western portion of the Indian Lake hamlet

NY 30 runs through the Adirondacks, accessing communities such as Speculator, Blue Mountain Lake, and Tupper Lake as a scenic byway named the Adirondack Trail. From Wells to Speculator, NY 30 is concurrent to NY 8, then with NY 28 from Indian Lake to Blue Mountain Lake. Between Blue Mountain Lake and Long Lake, NY 30 is concurrent with the western third of NY 28N.

Near Tupper Lake, it skirts the boundary between Franklin and Saint Lawrence for a considerable distance before entering Tupper Lake and intersecting NY 3. The two routes overlap to Harrietstown, where NY 30 splits from NY 3 and heads north along a series of lakes, including Upper Saranac Lake and Meacham Lake. North of Duane, NY 30 exits Adirondack Park and heads north towards Malone. Within the village, NY 30 briefly overlaps US 11. The Adirondack Trail ends at the east end of the overlap. The route continues north out of the village to the Canada–US border in Constable, where it becomes Route 138 upon entering Quebec at the Trout River Border Crossing.

== History ==
=== Old roads ===
Route 30 made up part of the privately owned Middletown and Roxbury Turnpike. The turnpike, which accessed the villages of Middletown and Roxbury, was created in 1808. The highway was about 23 miles (37 km) long, as that is the current stretch of Route 30 from Middletown to Roxbury.

The stretch of Route 30 from Middleburgh to Schoharie was also once part of the Middleburgh and Schoharie Plank Road.

=== Designation ===
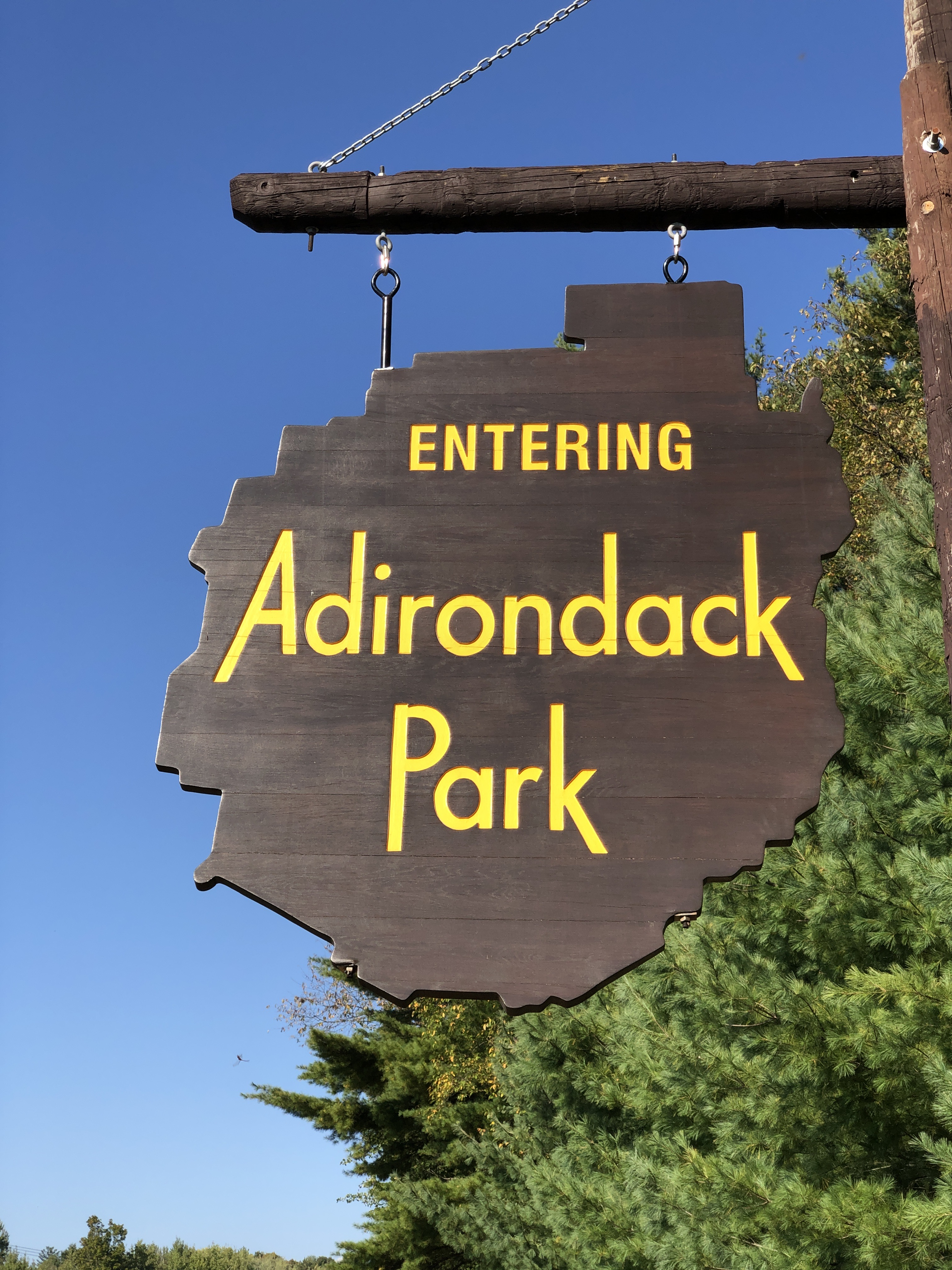
Sign along northbound NY 30 entering Adirondack Park

Prior to 1930, the modern routing of NY 30 carried a large number of designations. Between Margaretville and Grand Gorge in the town of Roxbury, what is now NY 30 was designated as part of NY 19. From Mayfield north to Malone, most of the current routing of NY 30 carried a designation. The portion from the modern junction of NY 30 and NY 30A in Mayfield to Speculator was part of NY 54. From Speculator to Indian Lake, NY 30 was the northernmost segment of NY 80. Between Indian Lake and Long Lake, NY 30 comprised the western half of NY 10A. Past Long Lake, NY 30 was part of NY 10 north to the modern junction of NY 30 and NY 186 west of Harrietstown. From NY 186 to modern NY 86 in Paul Smiths, the present alignment of NY 30 was unnumbered. Between Paul Smiths and Malone, NY 30 was part of NY 3. The remainder of NY 30 was unnumbered.

In the 1930 renumbering, NY 30 was largely assigned to its current alignment between the Hancock hamlet of East Branch and Wells, where it terminated at NY 8. Past Wells, the modern alignment of NY 30 was designated as NY 8 to Speculator and as NY 10 north to the Canada–US border. NY 10 was truncated southward to NY 8 in Arietta c. 1960, at which time NY 30 was extended north to Quebec along the former alignment of NY 10.

=== Realignments ===
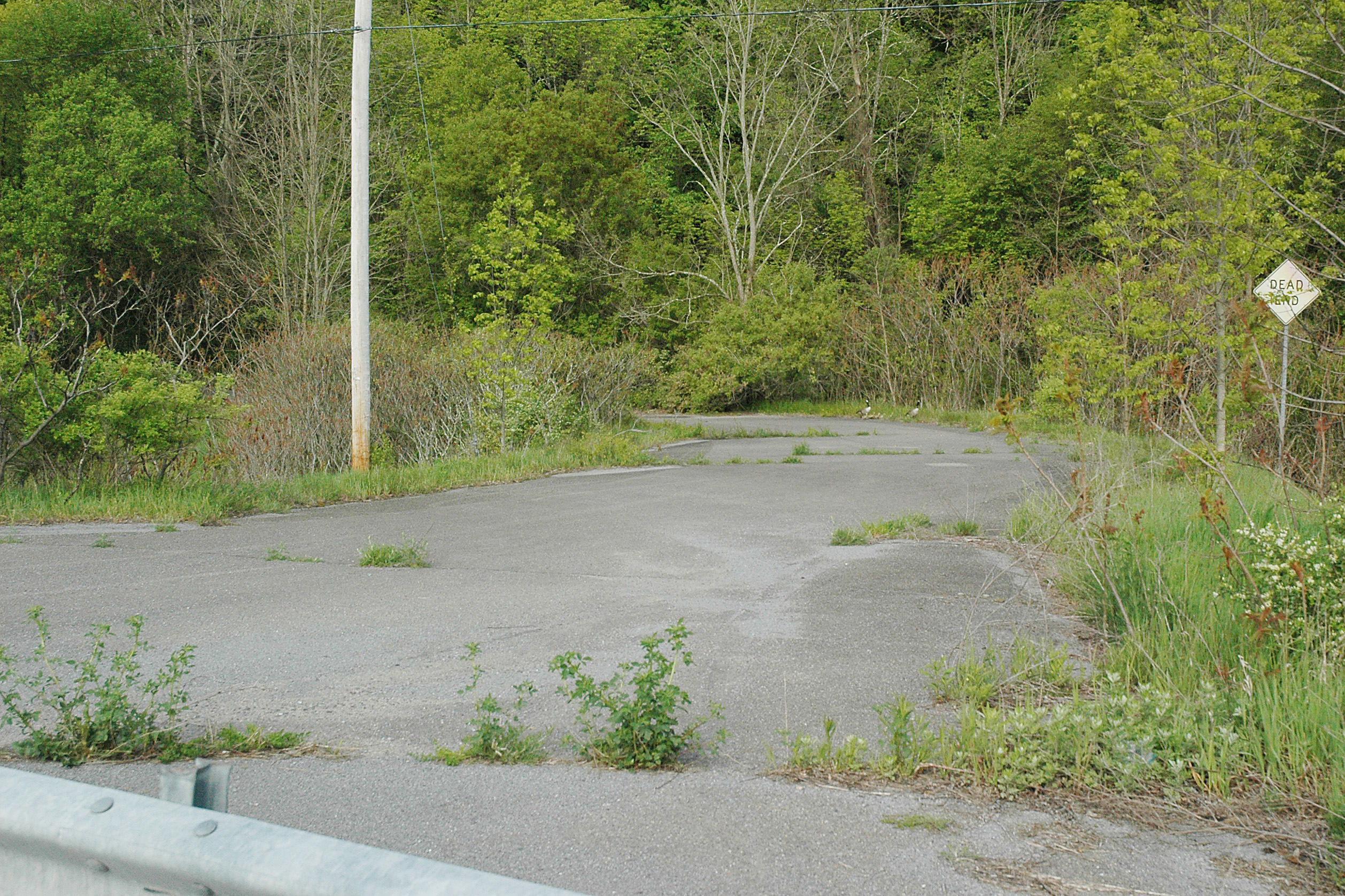
One of the entrances of the Old Route 30 trail

NY 30 has been realigned in two areas along its routing. The first realignment was in the Schoharie Valley near the hamlets of Breakabeen and Fultonham. NY 30 was originally routed along the base of Toepath Mountain near Fultonham and along a pair of village streets in Breakabeen. In the 1950s, a proposal was made to reroute NY 30 onto a new routing in the base of the valley surrounding Schoharie Creek. The proposal was approved, and the new alignment of NY 30 opened c. 1970. The former routing of NY 30 from Max V. Shaul State Park near Breakabeen to Fultonham, still visible from the modern alignment of the route, was closed to the public and guardrails were installed to stop motor traffic from using the route. However, biking and walking was still allowed, and the old highway is now a 1.5-mile-long (2.4 km) trail known as "Old Route 30". The trail is not maintained; thus, the quality of the blacktop along Old Route 30 has deteriorated over the years. There are significant potholes and overhanging trees, but the path is still traversable. A large landslide has taken out a section of the road at the southern end.

The second realignment of NY 30 was in the vicinity of the village of Northville. Route NY 30 originally entered the village by way of Bridge Street and followed Bridge, Main, and Reed streets through the village. It continued along the eastern bank of the Great Sacandaga Lake on what is now Old State Road and Old Northville Road and rejoined its modern alignment in the town of Hope. The route was realigned c. 1961 to follow a new highway along the western lakeshore, bypassing Northville entirely. The portion of Bridge Street from NY 30 to the Northville village line remains state-maintained as NY 920H, an unsigned reference route 0.21 miles (0.34 km) in length. Farther north, the portion of Old Northville Road from the Fulton–Hamilton county line to its junction with NY 30 is maintained by Hamilton County as CR 15.

Two intersections with other state highways in the Town of Schoharie, NY 443 and NY 30A were simplified to simple T-intersections beginning in the summer of 2010. The latter intersection was the site of a deadly limousine crash in October 2018 that killed 20 people.

== Major intersections ==
County	Location	mi	km	Destinations	Notes
Delaware	Town of Hancock	0.00	0.00	Future I-86 / NY 17 – New York City, Binghamton	Southern terminus; exit 90 (NY 17); hamlet of East Branch
Delaware	Colchester	14.92	24.01	NY 206 west – Walton	Southern terminus of NY 206 concurrency; hamlet of Downsville
Delaware	Colchester	18.02	29.00	NY 206 east (Cat Hollow Road) – Roscoe	Northern terminus of NY 206 concurrency
Delaware	Middletown	37.92	61.03	NY 28 north (Palmer Hill Road) – Andes	Southern terminus of NY 28 concurrency
Delaware	Margaretville	41.36	66.56	NY 28 south – Arkville	Northern terminus of NY 28 concurrency
Delaware	Roxbury	60.42	97.24	NY 23 – Stamford, Prattsville	Hamlet of Grand Gorge
Schoharie	Gilboa	63.40	102.03	NY 990V east – Gilboa	Western terminus of NY 990V
Schoharie	Town of Middleburgh	82.56	132.87	NY 145 north – Cobleskill	Western terminus of NY 145 concurrency
Schoharie	Village of Middleburgh	82.67	133.04	NY 145 south (Main Street) – Catskill	Eastern terminus of NY 145 concurrency
Schoharie	Town of Schoharie	88.75	142.83	NY 443 east – Gallupville	Western terminus of NY 443; hamlet of Vroman Corners
Schoharie	Town of Schoharie	90.18	145.13	NY 30A north to I-88 – Central Bridge	Southern terminus of NY 30A
Schoharie	Town of Esperance	92.10	148.22	NY 7 to I-88 – Duanesburg, Cobleskill	
Schenectady	Duanesburg	96.09	154.64	US 20 – Esperance, Duanesburg	
Schenectady	Duanesburg	102.19	164.46	NY 159 east (Mariaville Road) – Mariaville	Western terminus of NY 159
Montgomery	Florida	107.91	173.66	NY 161 west – Glen	Eastern terminus of NY 161
Montgomery	Florida–Amsterdam line	109.72	176.58	I-90 / New York Thruway – Albany, Buffalo	Exit 27 (I-90 / Thruway)
Montgomery	City of Amsterdam	110.03	177.08	NY 5S – Auriesville, Schenectady	Parclo interchange
Montgomery	City of Amsterdam	110.63	178.04	NY 5 east – Schenectady	
Montgomery	City of Amsterdam	110.73	178.20	NY 67 west	Southern terminus of NY 67 concurrency
Montgomery	City of Amsterdam	110.83	178.36	NY 5 west	
Montgomery	City of Amsterdam	110.94	178.54	NY 67 east (Church Street)	Northern terminus of NY 67 concurrency
Fulton	Town of Mayfield	118.95	191.43	NY 29 – Johnstown, Saratoga	Roundabout; hamlet of Vail Mills
Fulton	Town of Mayfield	122.29	196.81	NY 349 west – Gloversville	Eastern terminus of NY 349; hamlet of Red Bunch Corners
Fulton	Town of Mayfield	123.88	199.37	NY 30A south to I-90 Toll / New York Thruway – Gloversville, Johnstown, Fonda	Northern terminus of NY 30A; roundabout; hamlet of Riceville
Fulton	Northampton	134.18	215.94	Bridge Street (NY 920H) – Northville, Edinburg, Corinth, Hadley, Lake Luzerne, Lake George	Western terminus of unsigned NY 920H; former routing of NY 30
Hamilton	Wells	153.27	246.66	NY 8 north – Wevertown	Southern terminus of NY 8 concurrency
Hamilton	Speculator	162.97	262.27	NY 8 south – Lake Pleasant, Poland	Northern terminus of NY 8 concurrency
Hamilton	Town of Indian Lake	186.62	300.34	NY 28 north – North Creek	Southern terminus of NY 28 concurrency; hamlet of Indian Lake
Hamilton	Town of Indian Lake	198.02	318.68	NY 28 south / NY 28N east – Raquette Lake, Old Forge	Northern terminus of NY 28 concurrency; western terminus of NY 28N; hamlet of Blue Mountain Lake
Hamilton	Town of Long Lake	208.63	335.76	NY 28N east (Newcomb Road) – Newcomb	Northern terminus of NY 28N concurrency; hamlet of Long Lake
St. Lawrence	Piercefield	221.96	357.21	NY 421 west – Horseshoe Lake	Eastern terminus of NY 421
Franklin	Village of Tupper Lake	230.79	371.42	NY 3 west (Mill Street) – Potsdam, Watertown	Western terminus of NY 3 concurrency
Franklin	Harrietstown	236.32	380.32	NY 3 east (Tupper Lake Highway) – Saranac Lake	Eastern terminus of NY 3 concurrency
Franklin	Harrietstown	250.57	403.25	NY 186 east – Saranac Lake	Western terminus of NY 186; hamlet of Lake Clear
Franklin	Brighton	257.36	414.18	NY 86 east (Easy Street) – Saranac Lake, Lake Placid	Western terminus of NY 86; hamlet of Paul Smiths
Franklin	Duane	266.28	428.54	NY 458 west (Santa Clara Road) – St. Regis Falls	Eastern terminus of NY 458
Franklin	Duane	274.64	441.99	CR 26 – Mountain View, Owls Head	Former western terminus of NY 99
Franklin	Village of Malone	288.81	464.79	NY 11B west (Franklin Street) – Potsdam	Southern terminus of NY 11B concurrency
Franklin	Village of Malone	289.07	465.21	US 11 south (West Main Street) / NY 11B end / NY 37 west (Finney Boulevard) – Massena, Potsdam	Eastern termini of NY 11B and NY 37; southern terminus of US 11 concurrency
Franklin	Village of Malone	289.48	465.87	US 11 north (East Main Street)	Northern terminus of US 11 concurrency
Franklin	Constable	295.34	475.30	NY 122 east to US 11 north	Southern terminus of NY 122 concurrency
Franklin	Constable	295.42	475.43	NY 122 west to NY 37	Northern terminus of NY 122 concurrency
Franklin	Constable	300.71	483.95	R-138 north	Trout River Border Crossing; continuation into Quebec
1.000 mi = 1.609 km; 1.000 km = 0.621 mi: Concurrency terminus; Electronic toll collection

== NY 30A ==
New York State Route 30A
- Location: Schoharie–Mayfield
- Length: 34.86 mi (56.10 km)
- Existed: April, 1960–present

NY 30A is a 34.86-mile-long (56.10 km) alternate route of NY 30, running west of NY 30 from north of Schoharie to south of Mayfield through Fultonville, Fonda, Johnstown, and Gloversville. Along the way, it connects to several major east–west highways, including US 20 in Esperance and the New York State Thruway in Fultonville. It was assigned in April 1960 and replaced NY 148 north of NY 7 in Central Bridge and NY 43 south of NY 7.

== See also ==
- List of county routes in Schenectady County, New York
