= Raid on Vrooman's Land =

- Part of the American Revolutionary War
Date	August 9, 1780
Location	Middleburgh, New York

Belligerents
United States	Great Britain Mohawk

Commanders and leaders
Capt. Theunis Vrooman †	Joseph Brant; Adam Chrysler

Strength
N/A (Militia living among settlers)	73 Haudenosaunee; 5 Loyalists

Casualties and losses
5 killed 30 taken prisoner	none

The Raid on Vrooman's Land, also known as the Vrooman's Land Massacre or The Battle of Vrooman's Nose, was a frontier attack in the Schoharie Valley of New York during the American Revolutionary War.

== The attack ==
On August 2, 1780, Captain Joseph Brant led an attack column of about 300 Haudenosaunee warriors and Loyalist soldiers that decimated the Canajoharie District of Tryon County. Despite a vigorous pursuit by the Albany County militia, Brant and his forces escaped unharmed. On August 9, he returned with a smaller force of 73 native warriors and five loyalists, attacking the Schoharie Valley near the upper fort.

At about 10 am on August 9, 1780, Brant's forces entered the Schoharie Valley from the west and quickly descended upon the settlement, attacking three or four farms at once. Captain Theunis Vrooman, commander of a company of exempts in the militia, was working the fields with his family. He, his wife, and son, Peter, were killed and scalped; their three remaining sons and two slaves taken prisoner and their farm burned. Also killed were Christina, wife of a Lieutenant Vrooman, and their two-year-old daughter, Christina. About 30 prisoners were taken off, several of whom died in captivity on the long march to Niagara. The raiders burned about 20 dwellings and likely as many barns, chasing off or killing much of the livestock.

== See also ==
- Vroman's Nose
