= Fulton, Schoharie County, New York =

Town in Schoharie County, New York, US

Fulton, New York
- Town
- Location in Schoharie County and the state of New York.
- Coordinates: 42°34′16″N 74°27′13″W
- Country: United States
- State: New York
- County: Schoharie

Area
  - Total: 64.9 sq mi (168.2 km^{2})
  - Land: 64.9 sq mi (168.2 km^{2})
  - Water: 0 sq mi (0.0 km^{2})
- Elevation: 1,150 ft (350 m)

Population (2020)
  - Total: 1,199
- Time zone: UTC-5 (Eastern (EST))
  - Summer (DST): UTC-4 (EDT)
- FIPS code: 36-27826
- GNIS feature ID: 0978980
- Website: Town website

Fulton is a town in Schoharie County, New York, United States. The population was 1,199 at the 2020 census. Within the town of Fulton are the hamlets of Breakabeen and Fultonham. The town is in the center of the county and is also one of the larger towns in the county. Fulton is west of Albany.

== History ==
The territory was in the realm of the Mohawk tribe.

The town was first settled around 1715 after being purchased directly from local natives. Part of the early town was called Vroomansland after Adam Vrooman, the landowner. However, other settlers of German extraction, desiring the same land, fomented trouble with the natives.

Fulton was established from part of the Town of Middleburgh in 1828.

The Shafer Site was listed on the National Register of Historic Places in 1980.

== Notable people ==
- William C. Bouck, former Governor of New York, who lived at Bouck's Island in Breakabeen.
- John McGiver, 1960s Hollywood character actor, lived here.

== Geography ==
According to the United States Census Bureau, the town has a total area of 65.0 square miles (168 km^{2}), all land.

The Schoharie Creek flows through the town. Panther Creek flows eastward through the southern part of Fulton to Schoharie Creek.

New York State Route 30 is a north–south highway in Fulton.

== Demographics ==
Historical population
| Census | Pop. | Note | %± |
|---|---|---|---|
| 1830 | 1,592 | | — |
| 1840 | 2,147 | | 34.9% |
| 1850 | 2,566 | | 19.5% |
| 1860 | 2,914 | | 13.6% |
| 1870 | 2,700 | | −7.3% |
| 1880 | 2,683 | | −0.6% |
| 1890 | 2,316 | | −13.7% |
| 1900 | 1,998 | | −13.7% |
| 1910 | 1,450 | | −27.4% |
| 1920 | 1,227 | | −15.4% |
| 1930 | 1,010 | | −17.7% |
| 1940 | 1,010 | | 0.0% |
| 1950 | 1,050 | | 4.0% |
| 1960 | 1,008 | | −4.0% |
| 1970 | 1,060 | | 5.2% |
| 1980 | 1,394 | | 31.5% |
| 1990 | 1,514 | | 8.6% |
| 2000 | 1,495 | | −1.3% |
| 2010 | 1,442 | | −3.5% |
| 2020 | 1,199 | | −16.9% |
U.S. Decennial Census

As of the census of 2000, there were 1,495 people, 499 households, and 353 families residing in the town. The population density was 23.0 inhabitants per square mile (8.9/km^{2}). There were 805 housing units at an average density of 12.4 per square mile (4.8/km^{2}). The racial makeup of the town was 89.77% White, 8.16% African American, 0.40% Native American, 0.07% Asian, 1.00% from other races, and 0.60% from two or more races. Hispanic or Latino of any race were 5.22% of the population.

There were 499 households, out of which 29.5% had children under the age of 18 living with them, 57.1% were married couples living together, 8.0% had a female householder with no husband present, and 29.1% were non-families. 22.0% of all households were made up of individuals, and 11.6% had someone living alone who was 65 years of age or older. The average household size was 2.52 and the average family size was 2.89.

In the town, the population was spread out, with 20.1% under the age of 18, 12.4% from 18 to 24, 30.6% from 25 to 44, 24.7% from 45 to 64, and 12.2% who were 65 years of age or older. The median age was 37 years. For every 100 females, there were 130.7 males. For every 100 females age 18 and over, there were 138.3 males.

The median income for a household in the town was $35,144, and the median income for a family was $39,167. Males had a median income of $30,625 versus $24,911 for females. The per capita income for the town was $13,565. About 14.2% of families and 18.2% of the population were below the poverty line, including 23.3% of those under age 18 and 15.9% of those age 65 or over.

== Politics ==
The current Supervisor of the town of Fulton is Democrat Phil Skowfoe. Skowfoe had two opponents, a Republican and a Conservative, in the last election.

== Communities and locations in Fulton ==
- Bouck's Falls — A popular resting area.
- Bouck Hollow — A location east of Schoharie Creek, in the southeast of Fulton.
- Bouck's Island — A location on Schoharie Creek, southeast of Fultonham.
- Breakabeen — A hamlet in the southern part of the town on NY-30. It was originally called "Brakabeen," by the original German settlers, meaning a flat area covered with ferns.
- Fultonham — A hamlet in the southwestern section of the town on NY-30, located north of Panther Creek.
- Housons Corners — A location east of Breakabeen on County Road 36.
- Max V. Shaul State Park — A state park south of Fultonham on NY-30.
- Patria — A hamlet near the town center, northwest of Fultonham.
- Vintonton — A location near the northwestern town line on County Road 4, west of Patria. Formerly, it was called "Vintontown."
- Vroman's Nose — A location near the eastern town boundary, east of Watsonville.
- Watsonville — A hamlet northeast of Fultonham on NY-30.
- West Fulton — A hamlet southwest of Fultonham, near the southern town line, by the junction of County Roads 4 and 20. It was previously known as "Byrneville" and "Sapbush Hollow." The West Fulton Methodist Church was listed on the National Register of Historic Places in 2013.
