= Simon Fraser of Balnain =

British army officer (1729–1777)

Brigadier-General Simon Fraser
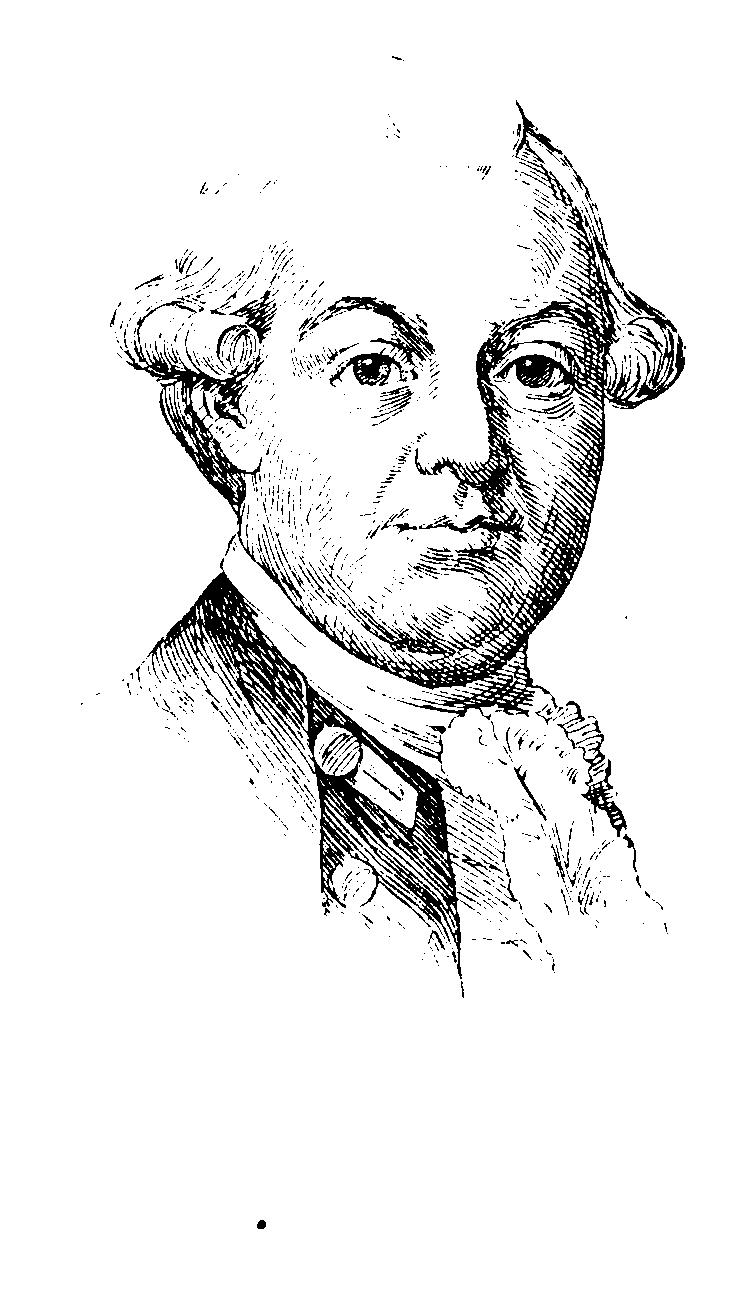
- Born: 26 May 1729; Balnain, Inverness-shire
- Died: 7 October 1777 (aged 48); Saratoga, New York
- Burial place: Saratoga
- Military career
- Allegiance: Dutch Republic; Great Britain
- Branch: Dutch States Army; British Army
- Service years: 1747 (Dutch States Army); 1755–1777 (British Army)
- Rank: Brigadier-General (British Army)
- Units: 24th Regiment of Foot
- Conflicts: War of the Austrian Succession; Siege of Bergen op Zoom (1747); French and Indian War; Siege of Louisbourg (1758); Battle of the Plains of Abraham; American Revolutionary War; Invasion of Quebec (1775); Battle of Trois-Rivières; Saratoga campaign; Siege of Fort Ticonderoga (1777); Battle of Hubbardton; Battle of Freeman's Farm; Battle of Bemis Heights †

Brigadier-General Simon Fraser (1729 – 7 October 1777) was a British Army officer who served in the American War of Independence. He was killed at the Battle of Bemis Heights of the Battles of Saratoga. The shot that killed Fraser is often attributed to Continental Army soldier Timothy Murphy.

== Early life and military service ==
Simon was born 26 May 1729, the son of Alexander Fraser of Balnain, son of Hugh Fraser of Balnain by his wife Katherine Chisholm, daughter of Alexander Chisholm 19th of Chisholm by his wife, eldest daughter of Roderick Mackenzie I of Applecross. Simon Fraser's mother was his father's second wife, Jean Mackintosh, daughter of Angus Mackintosh 10th of Kyllachy by his wife Lucy, daughter of Sir Alexander Mackenzie, 2nd baronet of Coul. Simon's brother Thomas Fraser (born 8 June 1726), M.D. of Antigua's daughter Jean married Charles Grant, parents of Charles Grant, 1st Baron Glenelg

Apparently seeking to atone for the participation of Simon Fraser, 11th Lord Lovat in the Jacobite rising of 1745, he fought with the Dutch States Army at Siege of Bergen-op-Zoom in 1747, and joined the British Army as a lieutenant in 1755.

Fraser went to Canada with the British forces in the French and Indian War and took part in the Siege of Louisbourg. He was promoted to captain before taking part in the Battle of Quebec in 1759. At that battle, he was in James Wolfe's boat crossing St Lawrence. It was his reply, in French through the fog, that enabled the party to sneak ashore before ascending to the Plains of Abraham. He is not the Simon Fraser depicted in the famous painting The Death of General Wolfe.

Fraser served in Germany, Ireland, and Gibraltar between wars. In 1768, he became the Lt. Colonel of the 24th Regiment of Foot.

== American War of Independence ==
In 1776, the 24th was transferred to Quebec in response to the American invasion, and Governor Guy Carleton promoted him to Brigadier General. When John Burgoyne organized his Saratoga campaign in 1777, Fraser was chosen to command the advance unit.

=== Ticonderoga ===
At the start of the campaign, the advance corps had about 1,000 men. Besides his own 24th Regiment of Foot, he had a grenadier battalion, light infantry battalion, and a company of marksmen, along with some Canadian militia and First Nations auxiliaries. Fraser's command was in the vanguard during the taking of Fort Ticonderoga, and Fraser helped dislodge the retreating Americans.

=== Hubbardton ===
On 7 July 1777, Fraser's corps caught up with the American rear guard at the town of Hubbardton in the newly formed Republic of Vermont. At the Battle of Hubbardton in a sharp skirmish he drove off the enemy but with the loss of many men.

=== Freeman's Farm ===
At the Freeman's farm on 19 September he commanded the right wing and led four companies in a successful attack on Daniel Morgan's riflemen.

=== Bemis Heights ===
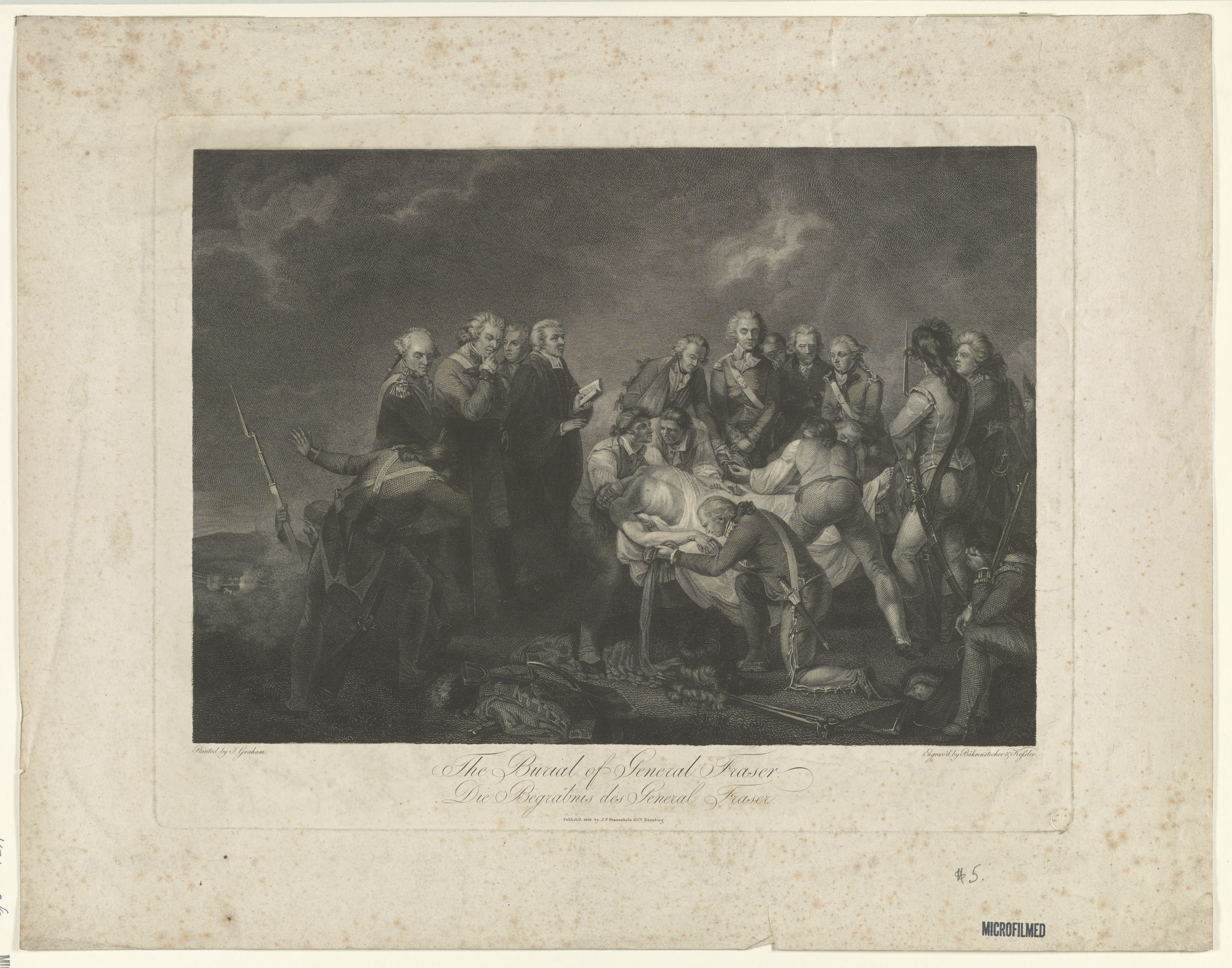
The Burial of General Fraser after the Battle at Bemis Heights

Early in the Battle of Bemis Heights on 7 October 1777, Fraser fell to rifle fire from Daniel Morgan's rifle brigade. Legend has it that a rifleman named Timothy Murphy was specifically ordered by Benedict Arnold to target Fraser, as he was vigorously directing and supporting his troops. He was carried to a nearby house and placed in the care of Baroness Riedesel, where he died that evening. He was reportedly buried in a nearby redoubt, but the exact location is uncertain. In her diary, the Baroness noted that he was "...buried at six o'clock in the evening, on a hill, which was a sort of redoubt."

The depiction by the artist John Graham in 1792 shows Fraser being wrapped for burial on the battlefield, surrounded by grieving officers and soldiers under his command. Also killed during the action was Francis Clerke (1748–1777), the aide-de-camp to General Burgoyne. Clerke was also shot and killed by Morgan's riflemen as he rode upon the field to deliver orders to Fraser from Burgoyne to fall back, orders that never reached him.

Fraser's death is noted by a memorial plaque in the Saratoga Battlefield National Park.

== Portrayal in historical fiction ==
Fraser is a character in Diana Gabaldon's historical fiction novel An Echo in the Bone in which she portrays him as a kinsman to several of the major characters in the book, most notably Jamie Fraser, who is fighting on the side of the revolutionaries and William Ransom, Jamie's son, who is fighting for the British under Simon Fraser's command. The book diverts from the historical events when Gabaldon uses a request by Horatio Gates as an excuse for three main characters, Jamie, his wife Claire, and Jamie's nephew Ian Murray, to return to Scotland under the auspices of escorting Fraser's disinterred body back to his homeland.

== See also ==
- 29th Regiment of Foot
