= Bouck's Island =

Farm near Breakabeen, New York, US

Bouck's Island is a farm near Breakabeen, New York within the town of Fulton, Schoharie County, New York near Fultonham, New York. Bouck's Island was the home of former New York governor William C. Bouck. Congressman Joseph Bouck was born on Bouck's Island and Wisconsin Congressman Gabriel Bouck once lived there.

== Early history ==
Bouck's Island was originally settled by Indians of the Mohawk, Iroquois tribe. This area was taken over by the British crown but heavily settled by the Dutch.

Bouck's Island was then settled by the Bouck family in the eighteenth century, when the land was granted to the father of William, John Fredrick and Christian (Father of William C. Bouck, Governor) Bouck, around 1711.

William C. Bouck became Sheriff of Schoharie County before becoming governor in 1843.

== Today ==
Today Bouck's island is still inhabited. It is situated off of NYS Route 30 and is a NYS Historic Site. Also associated with Bouck's Island is Bouck's Falls nearby.

== See also ==
- Boucks Island – The island.
