= Brock Mountain =

Mountain in New York, United States

- Location within New York Location within the United States

Highest point
- Elevation: 2,503 feet (763 m)
- Coordinates: 42°03′09″N 74°54′12″W

Geography
- Location: Downsville, New York, U.S.
- Topo map: USGS Downsville

Brock Mountain is a mountain located in the Catskill Mountains of New York southeast of Downsville, New York. Sugarloaf Mountain is located northwest of Brock Mountain and Mary Smith Hill is located east.
