= Vroman's Nose =

Mountain in New York, United States

Coordinates: 42°35′20″N 74°21′16″W

Vroman's Nose is a prominent hill in the town of Fulton in Schoharie County, New York, United States. It is among the more popular hiking sites in upstate New York and is of significant historical note.

Vroman's Nose from the Middleburgh Upper Cemetery

== Name ==
Vroman's Nose is a prominent landmark near Middleburgh and the Schoharie Creek. The area was inhabited by Iroquois Indians before the coming of the British. Contrary to local belief, the mount was not inhabited by the natives due to a lack of a stable water supply.

When the British and Palatines arrived in the Schoharie Valley in the early eighteenth century, the land was ceded to the Vroman family by the British government. Since that time, the landmark has been known for its particular shape.

== Revolutionary War ==
Vroman's nose served as a focal point in the American Revolutionary War. The Lower Fort of the Valley was located under the shadow of the mount. It is also rumored that the hero of the battle of Saratoga, Timothy Murphy, spent much time at Vroman's Nose and in fact lived nearby.

The Raid on Vrooman's Land occurred on August 9, 1780.

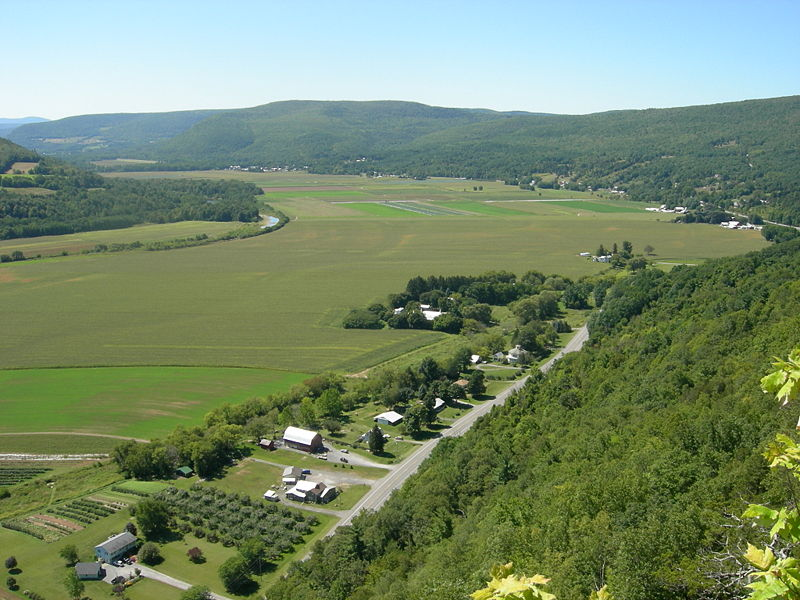
Southwest from Vroman's Nose

== Today ==
Plans were made to build a hotel on Vroman's nose in the 1930s, but were abandoned. Today, the mount is a prominent feature of Schoharie County. It is emblazoned on many seals and photographs. It has been named as a popular place for hiking, but camping is not permitted.

Vroman's Nose has also been a windfall for the study of geology in Upstate New York, being a sort of geologic anomaly.

== Features ==
The summit of Vroman's is a large and flat, left by glacial movements, and referred to as the "Dance Floor." A trail on Vroman's Nose is a portion of the Long Path.

Vroman's nose is also near Bouck's Island, where the former governor of New York William C. Bouck once lived.

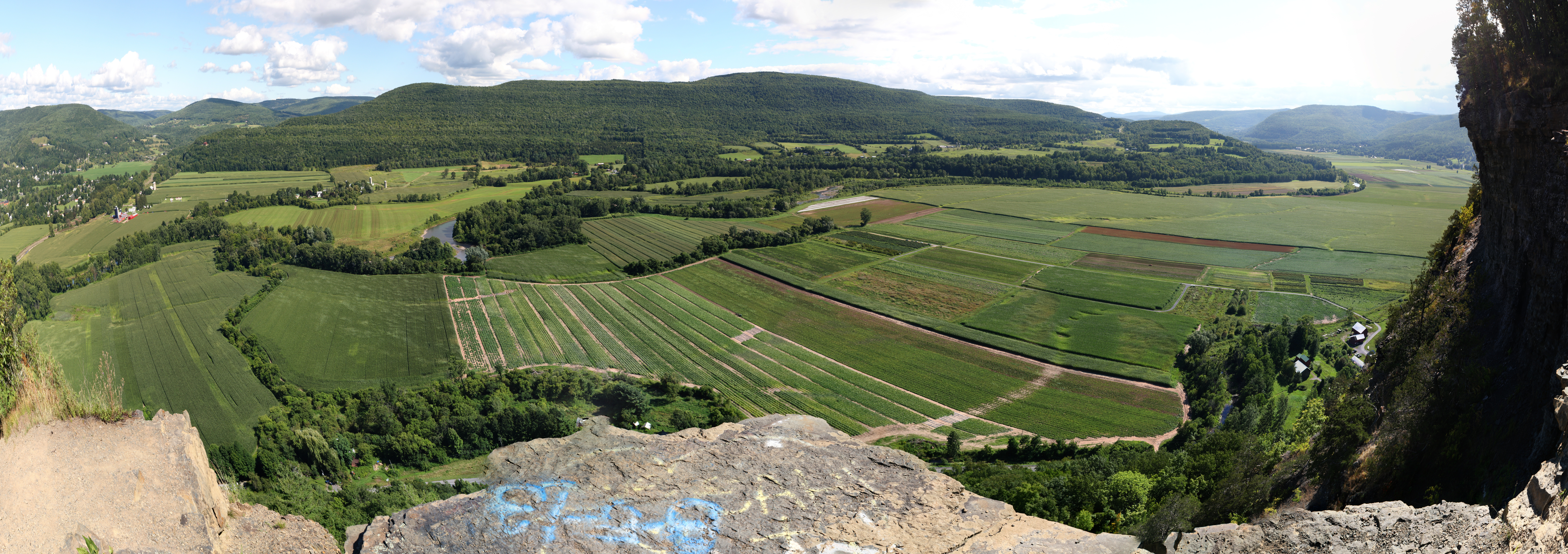
Panorama from Vroman's Nose
