= Breakabeen Historic District =

Historic district in New York, United States

- U.S. National Register of Historic Places
- U.S. Historic district
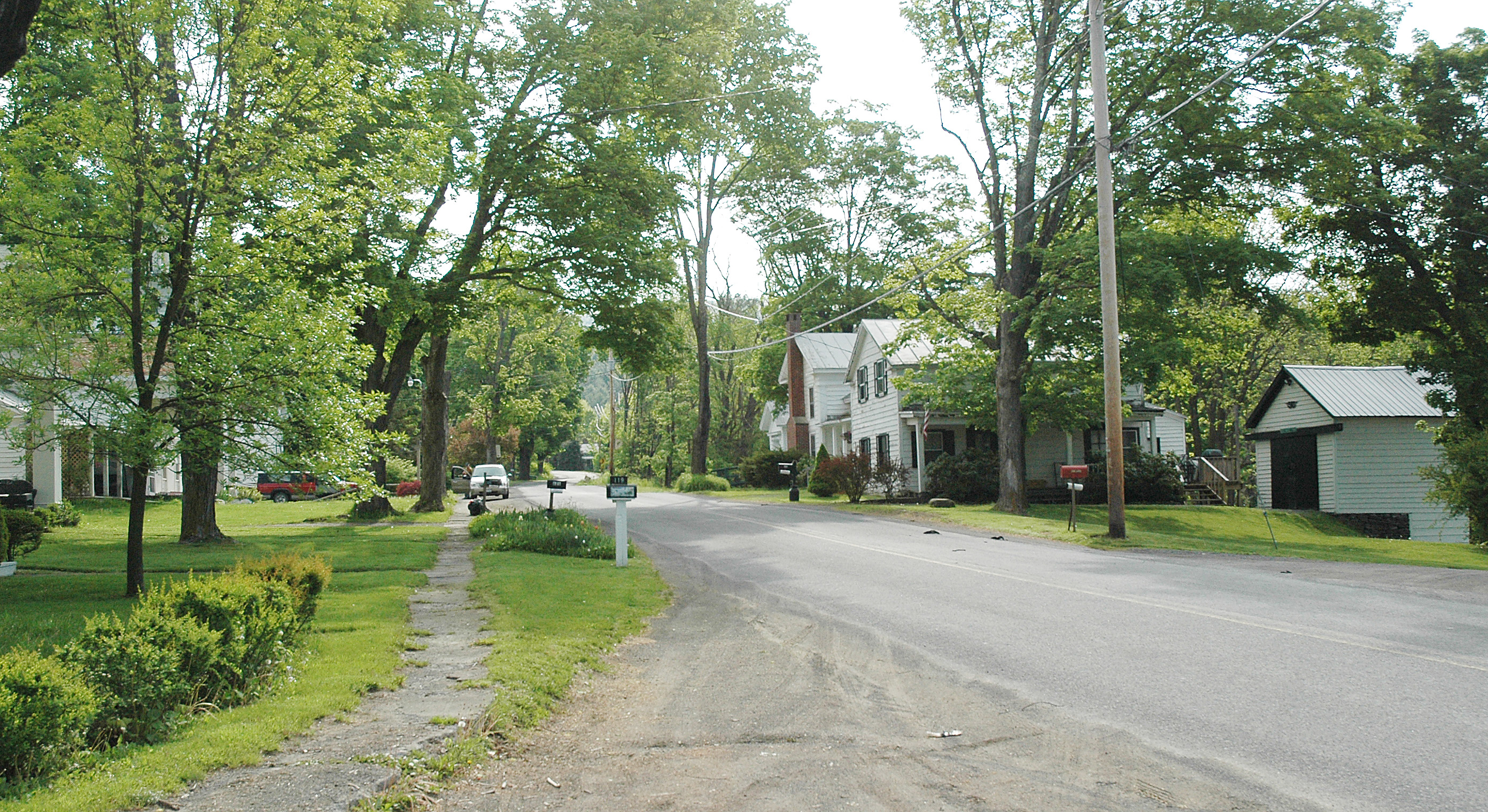
- Main Street, Breakabeen NY

- Location within New York Location within the United States
- Location: Roughly bounded by River St., New Rt. 30, and Main St. to Bush Rd., Breakabeen, New York
- Coordinates: 42°31′27″N 74°23′7″W
- Area: 3,718 acres (1,505 ha)
- Architect: Multiple
- Architectural style: Greek Revival
- NRHP reference No.: 74001304
- Added to NRHP: December 31, 1974

Breakabeen Historic District is a national historic district located at the hamlet of Breakabeen in Schoharie County, New York. The district includes 33 contributing buildings. Most of the buildings were built in the early to mid-19th century in a vernacular Greek Revival style. Several buildings are temple-like featuring one or two story high portico supported by square columns. The most interesting structure is a post American Civil War hotel. It is a large, square, two story building with a flat roof, exhibiting a variation of an Italian Villa theme.

It was added to the National Register of Historic Places in 1974.

== Gallery ==
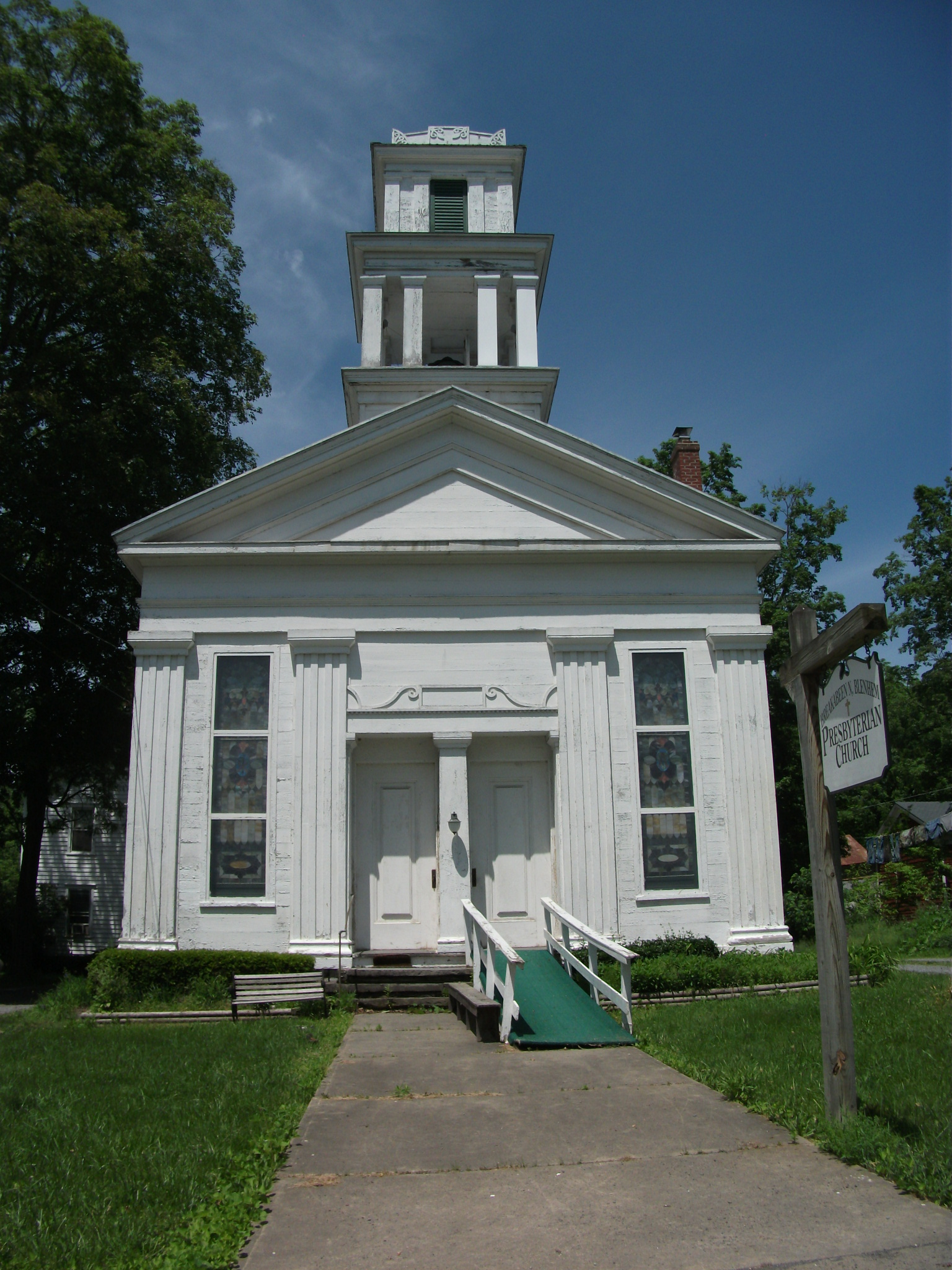
Breakabeen Presbyterian Church, June 2011
