= 1840 New York gubernatorial election =

- November 2–4, 1840
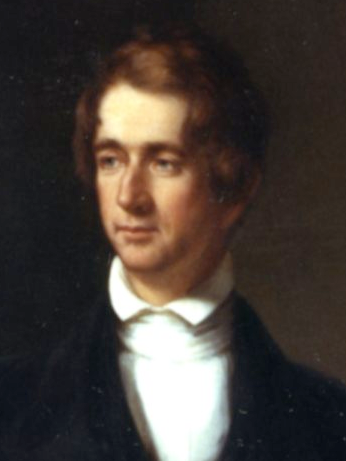

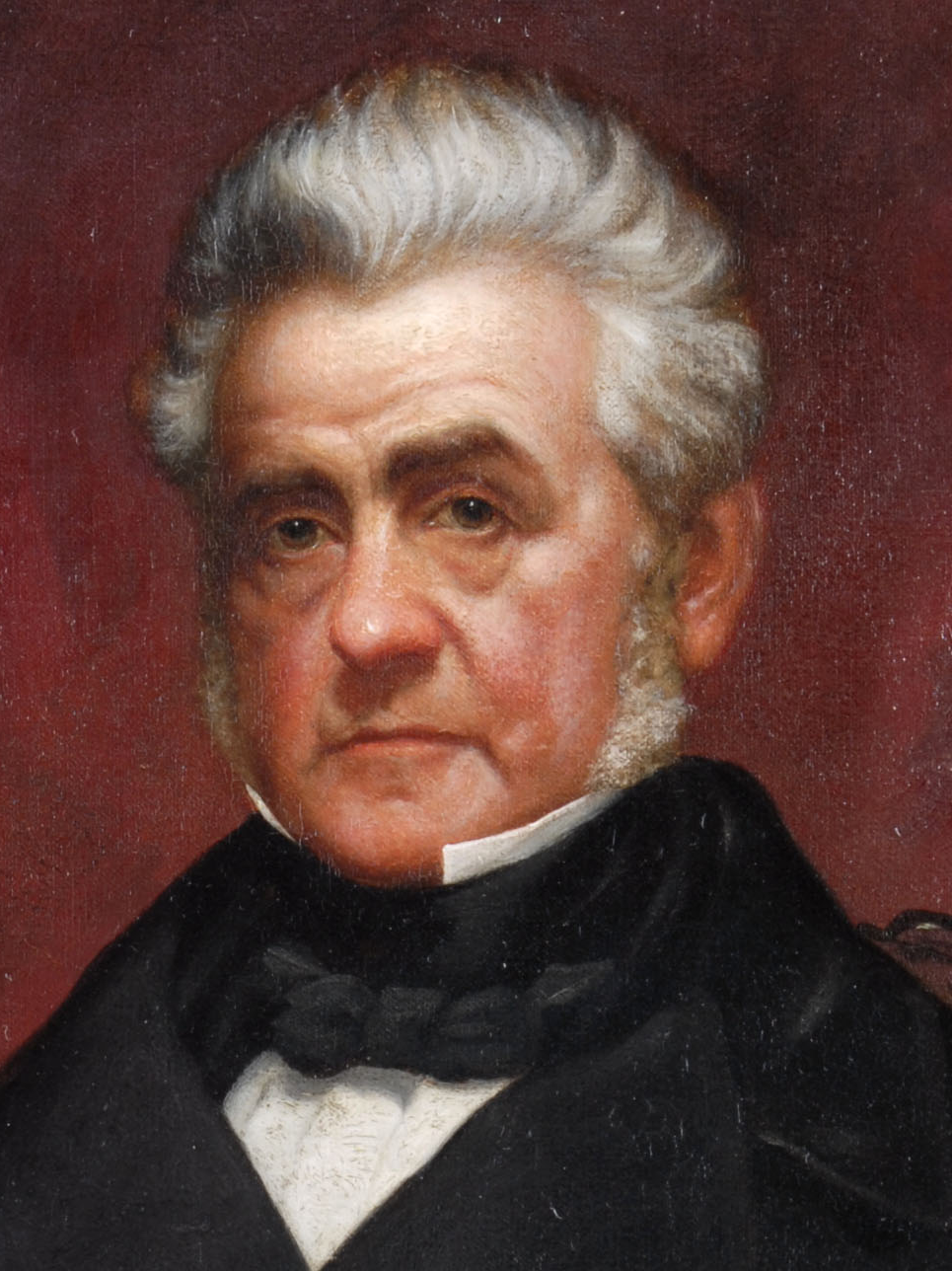
Nominee	William H. Seward	William C. Bouck
Party	Whig	Democratic
Popular vote	222,011	216,726
Percentage	50.30%	49.10%
- Results by county Seward: 40–50% 50–60% 60–70% Bouck: 40–50% 50–60% 60–70% 70–80% No Data/Vote
Governor before election
William H. Seward
Whig
Elected Governor
William H. Seward
Whig

The 1840 New York gubernatorial election was held from November 2 to 4, 1840, to elect the Governor and Lieutenant Governor of New York.

== General election ==
=== Candidates ===
- William C. Bouck, member of the Erie Canal Commission (Democratic)
- William H. Seward, incumbent Governor since 1839 (Whig)
- Gerrit Smith, Presbyterian (Note: Believing sectarianism to be inherently sinful, Smith separated from the Presbyterian Church in 1843 and established a non-denominational ministry.) minister and abolitionist (Liberty)

The Whig Party nominated incumbent governor William H. Seward. They nominated incumbent Luther Bradish for Lieutenant Governor.

The Democratic Party nominated former Erie Canal Commissioner William C. Bouck. They nominated state senator Daniel S. Dickinson for Lieutenant Governor.

The Liberty party nominated Gerrit Smith. They nominated Charles O. Shepard for Lieutenant Governor.

=== Results ===
The Whig ticket of Seward and Bradish was elected.

1840 New York gubernatorial election
Party	Candidate	Votes	%	±%
Whig	William H. Seward (incumbent)	222,011	50.30%	−1.09%
Democratic	William C. Bouck	216,726	49.10%	+0.49%
Liberty	Gerrit Smith	2,662	0.60%	N/A
Total votes		441,399	100%	

== Sources ==
- Result: The Tribune Almanac 1842
