= Middleburgh and Schoharie Railroad =

Railway line in New York state

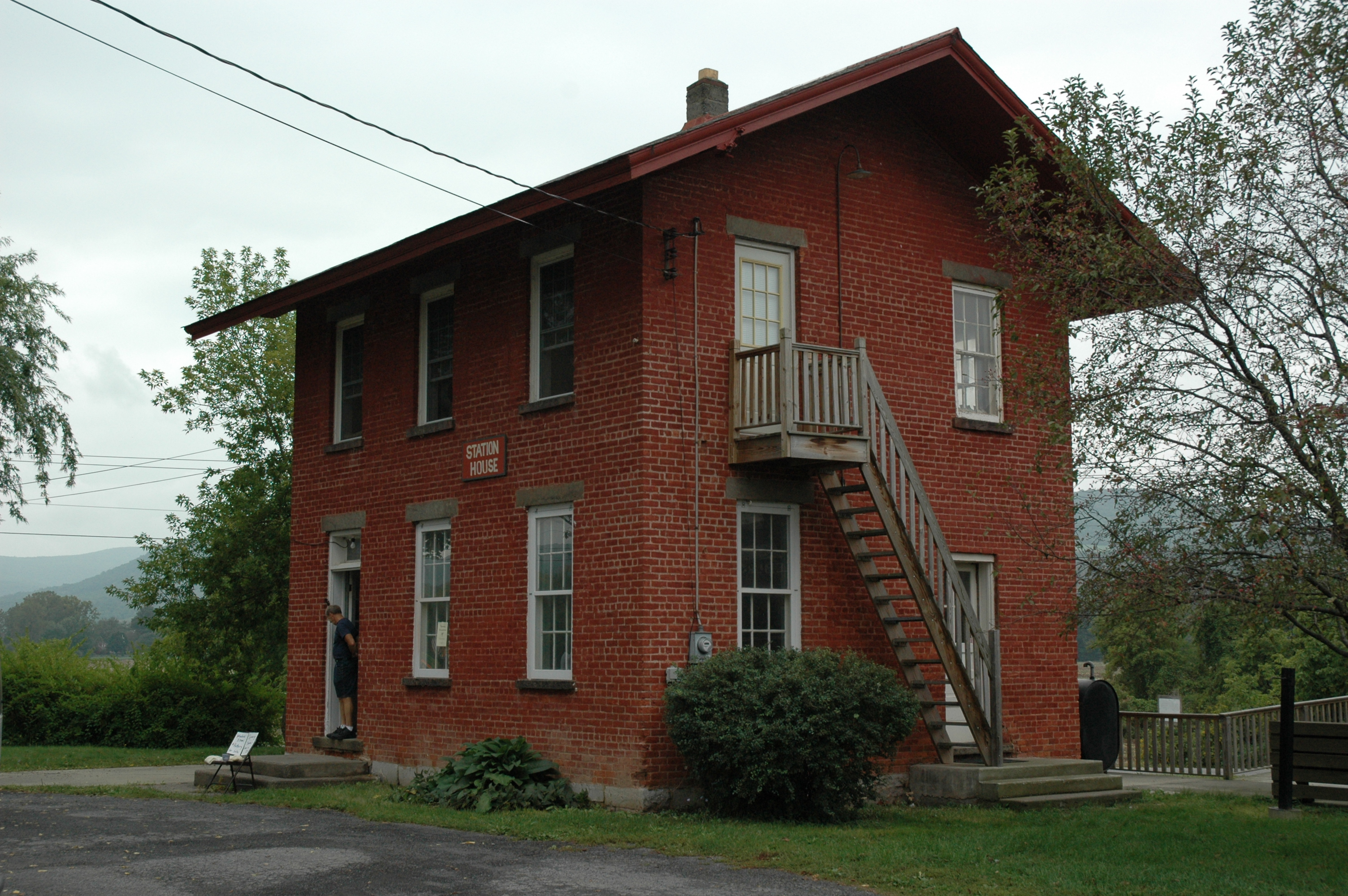
Schoharie station

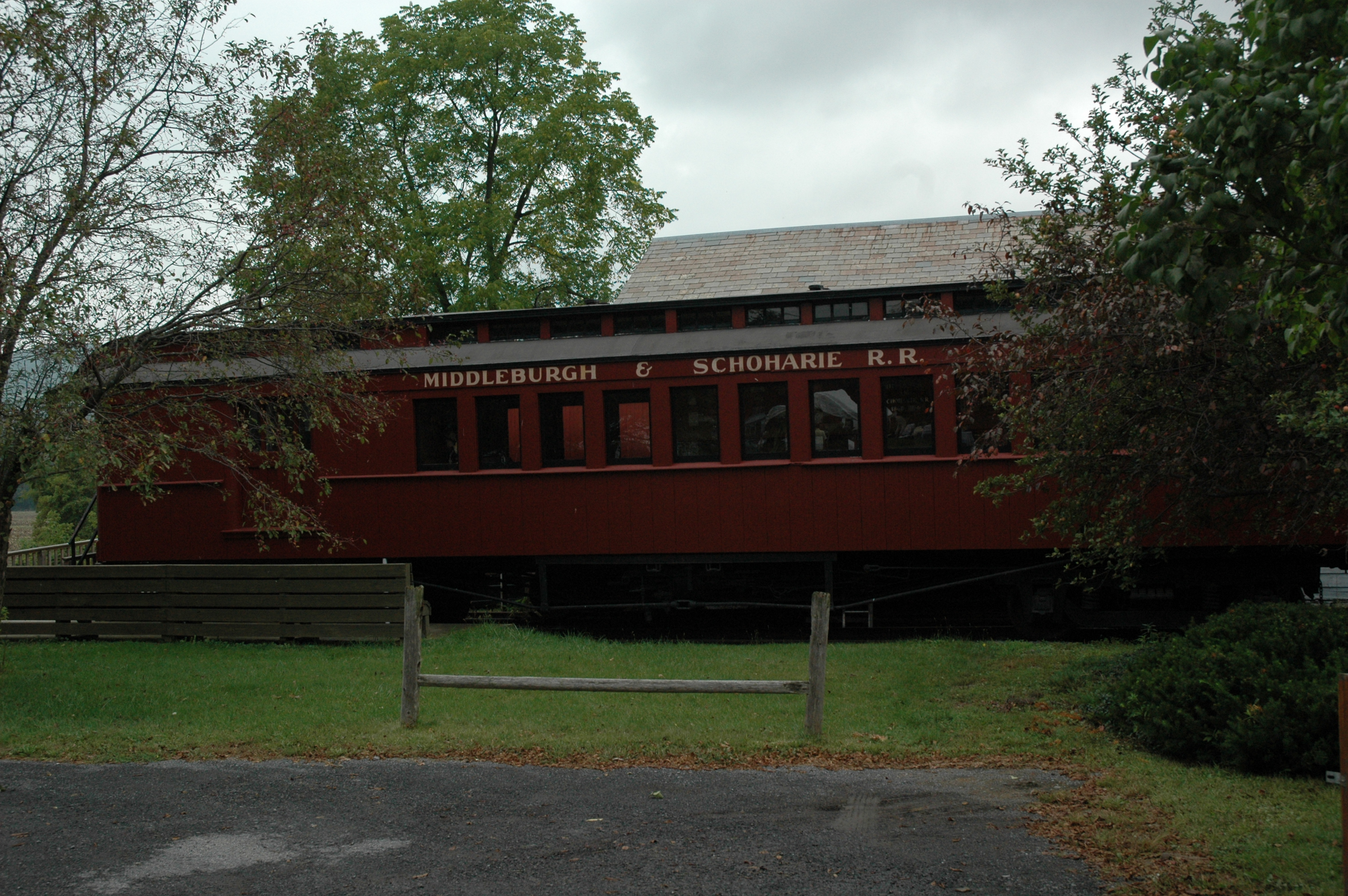
Railroad Car at Schoharie station.

The Middleburgh and Schoharie Railroad was a railroad in the U.S. state of New York. The Middleburgh–Schoharie Railroad served not only as a major passenger line in the Schoharie Valley but also as an artery of industry.

Hops were frequently sent over the line when Schoharie County was one of the major growers of hops. Fares for the railroad were cheap for the contemporary times and encouraged travel across the Schoharie Valley. This had not happened before this except for travel by horse or walking. The Middleburgh and Schoharie Railroad operated in conjunction with the Schoharie Valley Railroad, although they were separate companies, they frequently used each other's locomotives, equipment, and facilities. The Schoharie Valley Railroad ran between Schoharie and Schoharie Junction.

== History ==
The Middleburgh and Schoharie Railroad was founded in 1867. The first chairman of the railroad was Jacob Vroman and S.L. Mayham was named secretary. David Becker was named president of the railroad in 1868. The railroad was constructed at a cost of $105,000. Despite the construction, shares in the railroad dropped by ninety percent. The Railroad was aided by the fact that most of the terrain between Middleburgh and Schoharie is flat, reducing costs and engineering complexity.

=== Decline ===
After the rise of automobiles and the fall of the hop crop, the Middleburgh and Schoharie Railroad began to decline. The railroad's last day of service was September 24, 1936. The railroad had become unprofitable during the twentieth century. Reluctantly the historic railroad was closed, although there is speculation that it could be reopened in modern times as a tourist attraction. The sister railroad, the Schoharie Valley Railroad continued operation until September 17, 1942, when it too was closed due to changing times.

=== Remnants ===
The railway stations of Middleburgh and Schoharie still exist. The one in Schoharie is preserved and the other has been used as a house. The depot in Middleburgh has recently been purchased by the village and will be restored as a museum. A passenger car and a caboose of the old line are preserved in Schoharie and are open to the public. Within the passenger car is a model railroad of the original M&S. Possibly converting the old right of way into a rail trail has been brought up.

== Locomotives ==
Number	Name	Built	Builder	Purchased	Sold/Scrapped	Type	Notes
-	Middleburgh	1867 ?	Danforth	1868	1869	?	A dummy type locomotive, most likely just for experiment.
1	Pony or Middleburgh	1855	Danforth	1869	1895	4-2-4T	Previously worked on a railroad in Cleveland, named "Reindeer" in Cleveland.
2	Middleburg(h)	1895	Schenectady (Alco)	1895	1936	2-4-4T	Scrapped at abandonment. Numbered one on arrival.

== Presidents ==
- David Becker (1868–1870)
- Daniel D. Dodge (1870–1878)
- G.N. Frisbie (1878–1902)
- Duryea Beekman (1902–1916)
- D.D. Frisbie (1916–1931)
- Christopher S. Best (1931–1935)
- G.A. Hill (1935–1935)
- John B. Bingham (1935–1936)
