= Cannady Hill =

Mountain in New York, United States

- Location within New York Adirondack Park Location within the United States

Highest point
- Elevation: 2,116 feet (645 m)
- Coordinates: 42°36′20″N 74°14′25″W

Geography
- Location: E of Middleburgh, New York, U.S.
- Topo map: USGS Rensselaerville

Cannady Hill is a mountain in Schoharie County, New York. It is located east of Middleburgh. Windy Ridge is located southwest and Zimmer Hill is located north-northeast of Cannady Hill.
