= West Fulton Methodist Church =

Historic church in New York, United States

- U.S. National Register of Historic Places
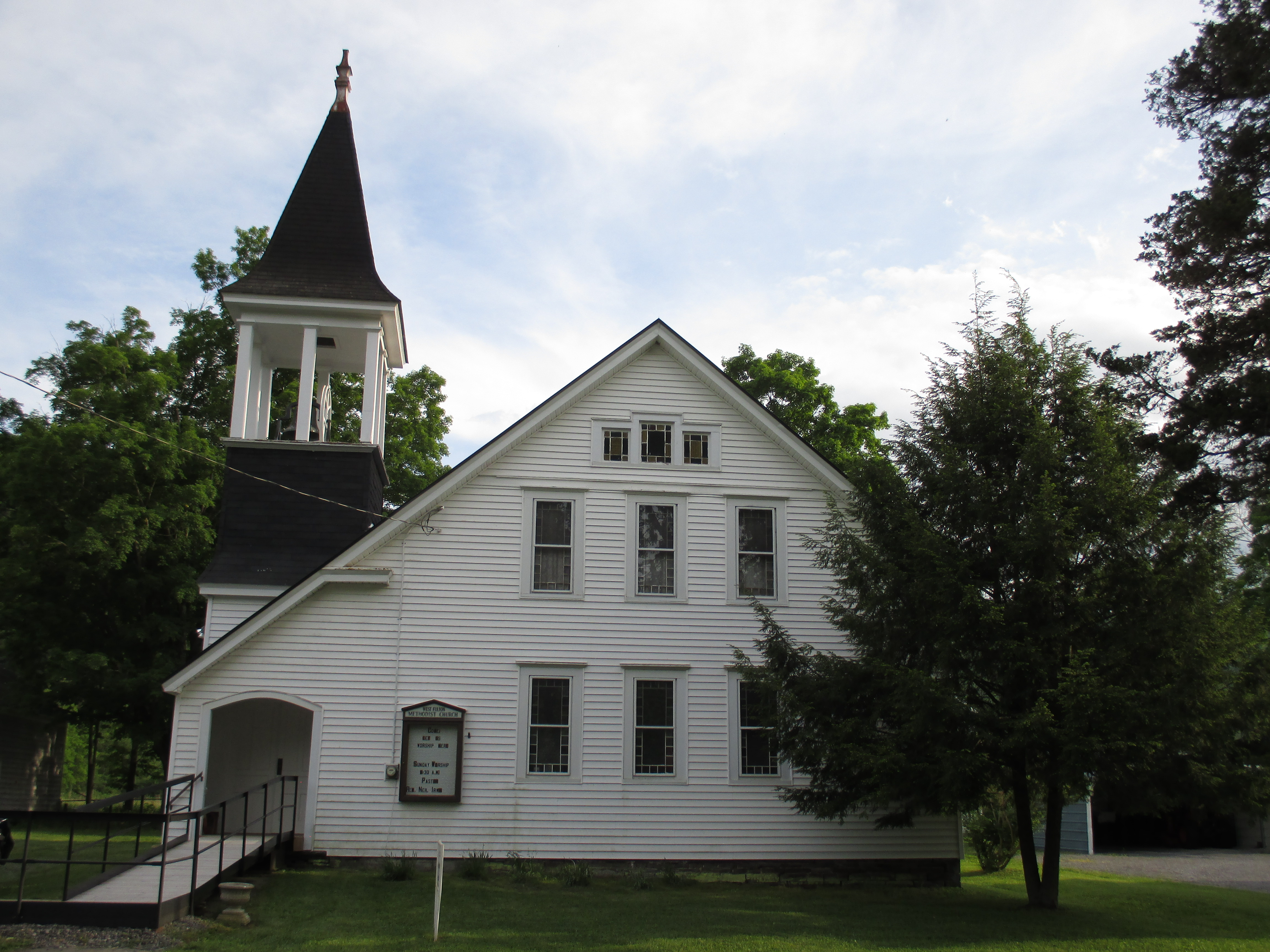

- Location within New York Location within the United States
- Location: 849 West Fulton Rd., near West Fulton, Fulton, New York
- Coordinates: 42°33′49″N 74°27′42″W
- Area: Less than 1 acre (0.40 ha)
- Built: 1906
- Architect: H.D. Karker
- Architectural style: Late Victorian
- NRHP reference No.: 12001261
- Added to NRHP: February 5, 2013

West Fulton Methodist Church is a historic Methodist church located in Fulton, Schoharie County, New York. It was built in 1906, and is a two-story, rectangular, Late Victorian style frame church. It has a broad front gable roof and sits on a limestone foundation. The front facade features an asymmetrically placed multi-stage bell tower. The interior is based on the Akron plan.

It was listed on the National Register of Historic Places in 2013.
