= Sugarloaf Mountain (Delaware County, New York) =

Mountain in New York, United States

- Location within New York Location within the United States

Highest point
- Elevation: 2,126 feet (648 m)
- Coordinates: 42°04′07″N 74°55′37″W

Geography
- Location: Downsville, New York, U.S.
- Topo map: USGS Downsville

Sugarloaf Mountain is a mountain located in the Catskill Mountains of New York east of Downsville, New York.
