= Boucks Island =

- Location within New York Adirondack Park Location within the United States

Geography
- Location: Schoharie Creek
- Coordinates: 42°33′25″N 74°23′52″W
- Highest elevation: 679 ft (207 m)

Administration
- United States
- State: New York
- County: Schoharie
- Hamlet: Fultonham

Boucks Island is an island in Schoharie County, New York. It is located south of Fultonham, on the Schoharie Creek.

== See also ==
- Bouck's Island – A historic farm.
