= Bouck's Falls =

Waterfall in New York

Coordinates: 42°32′25″N 74°25′34″W

Bouck's Falls is located in the town of Fulton in Schoharie County, New York. This 170-foot (52 m) waterfall is named after the family of former New York Governor William C. Bouck. The waterfall and surrounding lands and waterways are privately owned.

== History ==
The region around Bouck's Falls was settled by the British Crown in the early seventeenth century. During this time, the area was considered part of Albany County.

A house was built near the falls in 1856.

== Today ==
The waterfall is on private property.

== See also ==
- List of waterfalls
