= Fultonham, New York =

Hamlet in New York, United States

Fultonham
- hamlet
- Interactive map of Fultonham
- Coordinates: 42°34′6.27″N 74°23′43.51″W
- Country: United States
- State: New York
- County: Schoharie
- Elevation: 705 ft (215 m)
- Time zone: UTC-5 (Eastern (EST))
  - Summer (DST): UTC-4 (EDT)
- GNIS feature ID: 950806

Fultonham is a hamlet in Fulton, Schoharie County, New York, United States. Fultonham is located within the historic Schoharie Valley, positioned between Breakabeen and Middleburgh.

== Early history ==
The town of Fulton was colonized by the British in the early 18th Century. The hamlet of Fultonham grew out of this and became a minor station in Schoharie County.

Governor William C. Bouck lived as a farmer on Bouck's Island near Fultonham. His son and brother who both served in the US Congress, also lived in Fultonham.

Revolutionary War hero Timothy Murphy lived outside of Fultonham. Murphy is best remembered for killing British General Frasier during the Battle of Saratoga.

== Today ==
Franklinton is a Hamlet in Middleburgh as you go up Gates Hill Fultonham is just several miles south of Vroman's Nose. This general area, along Route 30 is known as an excellent biking area.

== Notable people ==
- Joseph Bouck, US Congressman.
- Timothy Murphy, Revolutionary War hero.
