= Timothy Murphy (sniper) =

American soldier (1751–1818)

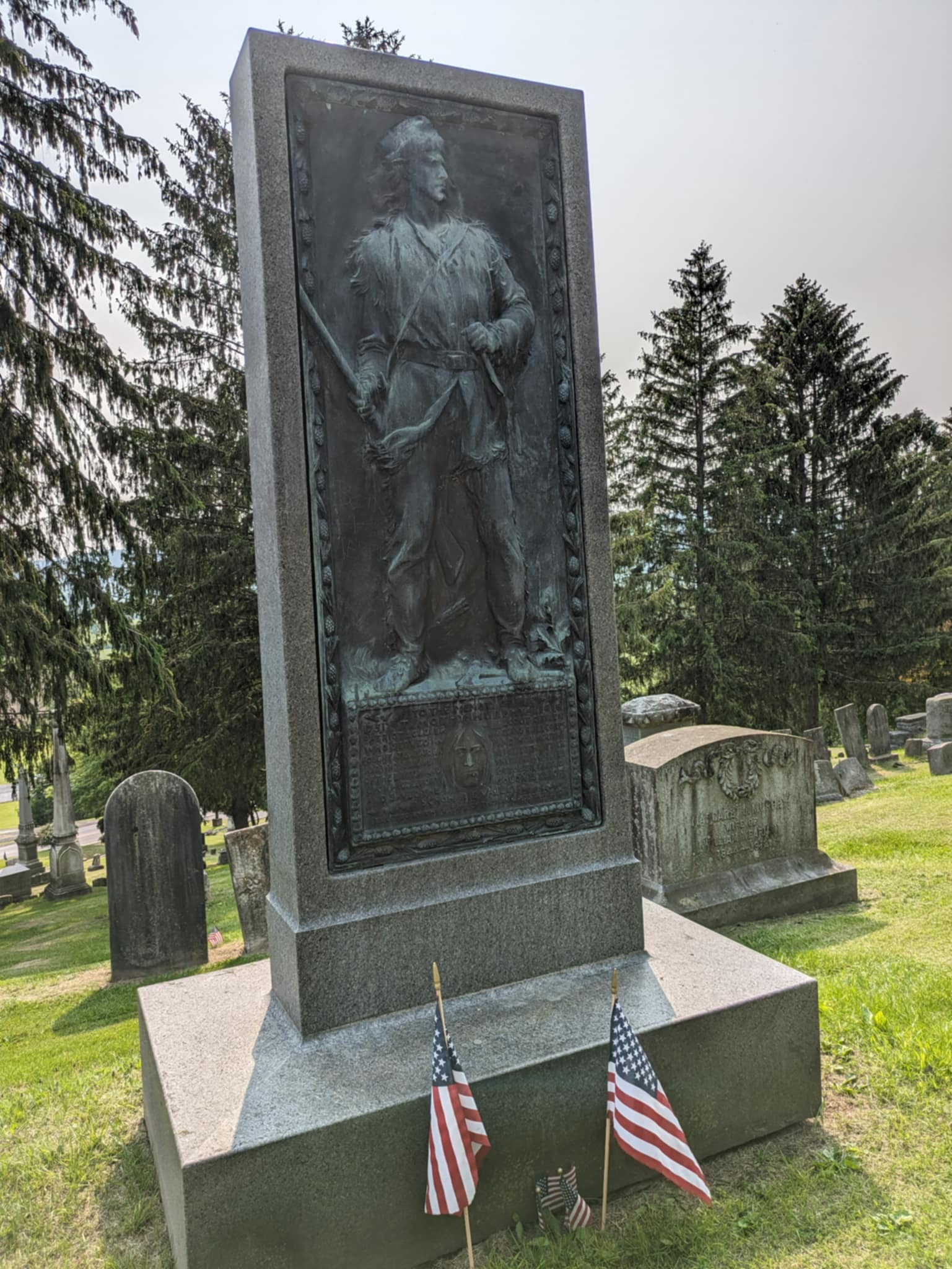
- A monument to Murphy
- Born: c. 1751; Pennsylvania, British America
- Died: c. 1818 (aged 66-67); Fultonham, New York, U.S.
- Occupation: Soldier
- Spouses: Margaret Feeck; Mary Robertson
- Children: 14

Timothy Murphy (c. 1751 – c. 1818) was an American soldier who fought during the Revolutionary War. In the Saratoga campaign, Murphy is reputed to have shot and killed British Army officers Sir Francis Clerke and Simon Fraser. Murphy's life is the subject of a 1953 novel titled The Rifleman by John Brick.

== Early life ==
Relatively few details of Murphy's early life are known. He was born in the year 1751 near the Delaware Water Gap. His parents were Presbyterians from County Donegal, Ireland who moved to Shamokin Flats (now Sunbury, Pennsylvania) in 1759, when Murphy was eight years old. A few years later, Murphy became an apprentice to a Mr Van Campen and moved with the van Campen family to the Wyoming Valley, which was then the frontier.

== American Revolutionary War ==
On June 29, 1775, shortly after the start of the American Revolutionary War, Timothy Murphy and his brother John enlisted in the Northumberland County Riflemen, specifically Captain John Lowdon's Company. Their unit saw action in the Siege of Boston, the Battle of Long Island, and "skirmishing in Westchester". After this, Murphy was promoted to the rank of sergeant in the Continental Army's 12th Pennsylvania Regiment and fought at the battles of Trenton and Princeton. Murphy was an "expert marksman", defined as being "able to hit a seven-inch target at 250 yards". In July 1777, this skill led to Murphy joining Daniel Morgan's newly formed Morgan's Riflemen.

Later that year, he was selected as one of 500 handpicked riflemen to go with General Daniel Morgan to Upstate New York to help stop General John Burgoyne and the British Army. As the battles around Saratoga raged, the British, having been pushed back, were being rallied by Brigadier-General Simon Fraser. Benedict Arnold rode up to General Morgan, pointed at Fraser and told Morgan the man was worth a regiment. Morgan called on Murphy and said, "That gallant officer is General Fraser. I admire him, but it is necessary that he should die, do your duty." Murphy scaled a nearby tree, took careful aim at the extreme distance of 300 yards, and fired three times. The first shot was a close miss, the second grazed the general's horse, and with the third, Fraser tumbled from his horse, shot through the stomach. General Fraser died that night. British senior officer Sir Francis Clerke, General Burgoyne's chief aide-de-camp, galloped onto the field with a message. Murphy's third shot killed him instantly.Murphy also fought at the battle of the Middle Fort in 1780.

Murphy's 1839 biography Life and Adventures of Timothy Murphy by Mr. Sigsby, reveals that Murphy "Sometimes habited in the dress of the Indian, with his face painted, he would pass among them, making important discoveries as to their strength and designs without detection." Sigsby also relates some of Murphy's infamous brutality against First Nations people: "The Indian was very large and powerful and Murphy being exceedingly angry, skinned his legs and drew it over his long stockings. ... But the skin of the Indian having shrunk, began to gall his legs, whereupon he took his hunting knife and ripped them off."

== Family ==
Murphy's first wife, Peggy (née Margaret Feeck), was the daughter of Johannes Feeck, a prosperous Dutch-American farmer in the valley. Timothy and Margaret Murphy had five sons and four daughters. Several years after the 1807 death of his first wife, Murphy married Mary Robertson, and relocated to Charlotteville, New York, and thereby she had four more sons.

== Interment ==
The bronze bas-relief plaque on Murphy's grave at Upper Middleburgh Cemetery, Middleburgh, New York was designed by sculptor Evelyn Beatrice Longman (1874–1954).
