= Joseph Bouck =

American politician

Member of the U.S. House of Representatives from New York's 12th district
- In office March 4, 1831 – March 3, 1833
- Preceded by: Peter I. Borst
- Succeeded by: Henry C. Martindale

Personal details
- Born: July 22, 1788 Bouck's Island, near Fultonham, New York, US
- Died: March 30, 1858 (aged 69) Middleburgh, New York, US
- Party: Jacksonian
- Profession: farmer; politician; Road Inspector

Joseph Bouck (July 22, 1788 – March 30, 1858) was an American politician and a U.S. Representative from New York serving one term from 1831 to 1833.

== Biography ==
Born on Bouck's Island, near Fultonham, New York, Bouck attended the rural schools of his native county. He was brother of William C. Bouck, and uncle of Gabriel Bouck.

== Career ==
Bouck engaged in agricultural pursuits for many years in Schoharie County until his change of residence to Middleburgh. He served as inspector of turnpike roads in Schoharie County in 1828.

=== Tenure in Congress ===
Elected as a Jacksonian to the Twenty-second Congress Bouck served as United States Representative for the twelfth district of New York from March 4, 1831, to March 3, 1833. He returned to his private life in Middleburgh, New York.

== Death ==
Bouck died on March 30, 1858 (age 69 years, 251 days). He is interred at Middleburgh Cemetery, Middleburgh, New York. Resided in Middleburgh, New York, until his death on March 30, 1858.

U.S. House of Representatives
Preceded by Peter I. Borst	Representative of the 12th Congressional District of New York; March 4, 1831 – March 4, 1833	Succeeded by Henry C. Martindale
