= Breakabeen, New York =

Hamlet in New York, United States

Coordinates: 42°31′27″N 74°24′35″W

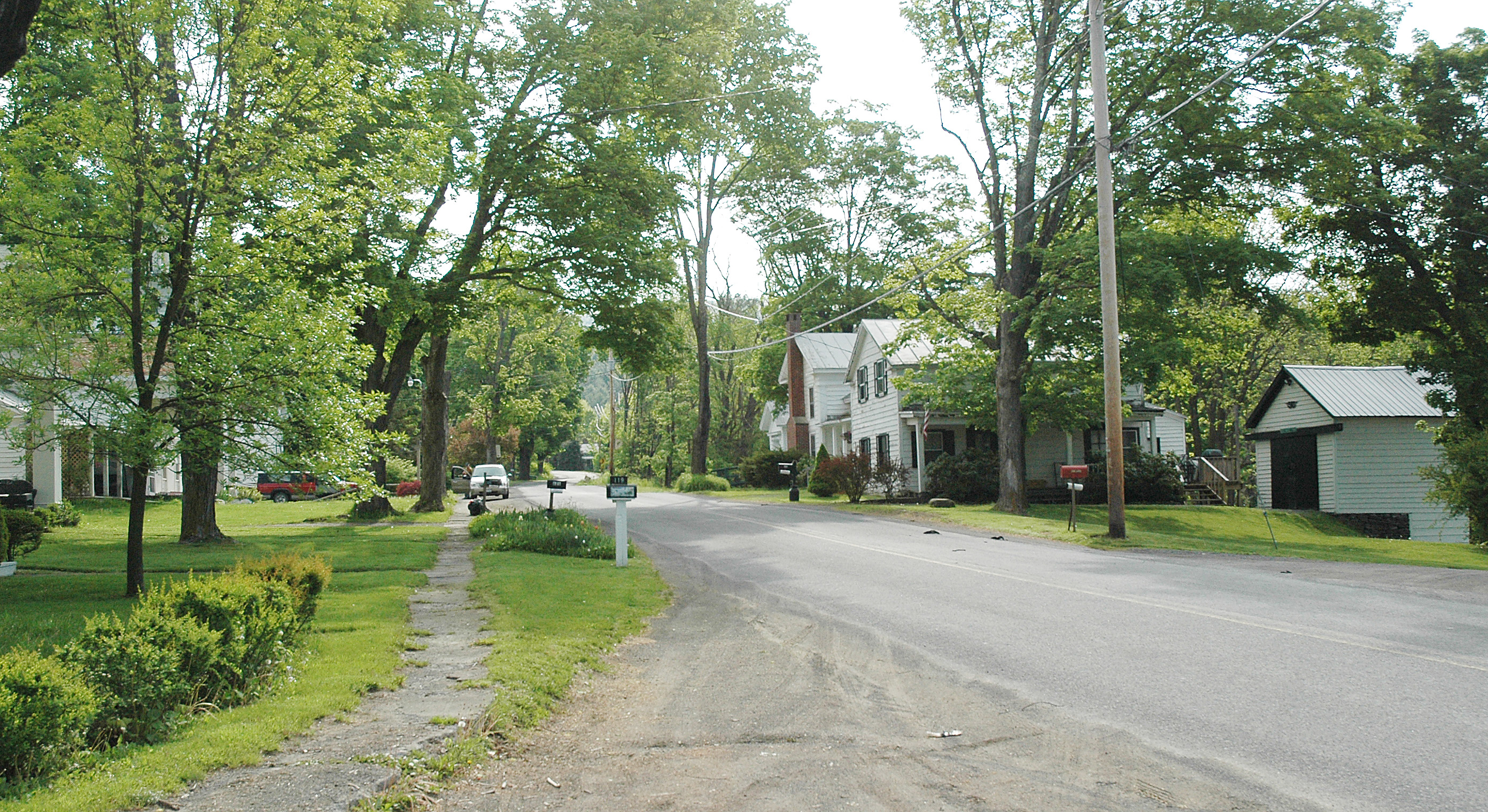
Main Street Breakabeen

Breakabeen is a hamlet in the town of Fulton in Schoharie County, New York, United States. This hamlet played a role during the American Revolution and is home to a historic cemetery. Breakabeen is one of the hamlets that are situated in the Schoharie Valley. A number of structures in the hamlet are included in the Breakabeen Historic District, listed on the National Register of Historic Places in 1974.

== Early history ==
Breakabeen was founded in the early eighteenth century, after the coming of the British. Prior to the British arrival, the area was inhabited by Iroquois Indians. The small hamlet was a part of Albany County. Much of the early European population was not British, but in fact Dutch, as with numerous other communities in this area.

The Schoharie Creek flows near Breakabeen, which encouraged both farming and colonization. During this time, Breakabeen and the town of Fulton were part of the town of Middleburgh.

== Revolutionary War ==
Breakabeen was just several miles south of the Lower Fort and was passed through by Patriot and British forces. There was a small battle in Breakabeen in the later part of the war. A portion of Breakabeen was destroyed in 1780 by British forces.

== Today ==
Breakabeen is inhabited by a small population that attends the Middleburgh school district. Right outside the hamlet is the Breakabeen Cemetery, which features a prominent grave of a World War I veteran.
