= Middleburgh, New York =

- Town
- Location in Schoharie County and the state of New York.
- Coordinates: 42°36′33″N 74°19′33″W
- Country: United States
- State: New York
- County: Schoharie
- Settled: 1713
- Incorporated: 1797

Government
  - Supervisor: Dennis Richards

Area
  - Total: 49.21 sq mi (127.45 km^{2})
  - Land: 49.11 sq mi (127.20 km^{2})
  - Water: 0.097 sq mi (0.25 km^{2}) 0.16%
- Elevation: 640 ft (195 m)

Population (2020)
  - Total: 3,112
- Time zone: UTC-5 (Eastern (EST))
  - Summer (DST): UTC-4 (EDT)
- ZIP code: 12122
- Area code: 518
- FIPS code: 36-46855
- GNIS feature ID: 0979212
- Website: Town of Middleburgh, NY

Middleburgh is a town in Schoharie County, New York, United States. The population was 3,112 at the 2000 census.

The Town of Middleburgh contains a village called Middleburgh. The town is on the county's eastern border and is west of Albany.

== History ==
Settlement took place circa 1712 near Middleburgh village, but the early years were marred by several competing claims to the site, once called Weiser's Dorf, named after its founder, Johann Conrad Weiser, Sr.

The American Revolution caused great hardship due to raids from British territory.

The town was formed along with the county in 1797 from the town of Schoharie and is one of the original towns of Schoharie County. It was called "Middletown" until 1801.

In 1881, the community of Middleburgh set itself off from the town by incorporating as a village.

In 1941 artist Mary Earley painted the oil and tempera mural Dance of the Hop Pickers in the Middleburgh post office. She had been commissioned by the Treasury's Section of Painting and Sculpture.

== Notable people ==
- Joseph Bouck, U.S. Congressman.
- Lyman Sanford, Adjutant General of New York, judge of Schoharie County
- Edward C. Sullivan, former member of the New York State Assembly and father of Nicole Sullivan.
- Nicole Sullivan, actress/comedian who appeared in MADtv and The King of Queens.
- Arlington P. Van Dyke, former member of the New York State Assembly

== Geography ==
According to the United States Census Bureau, the town has a total area of 49.3 square miles (127.6 km^{2}), of which 49.2 square miles (127.4 km^{2}) is land and 0.1 square mile (0.2 km^{2}) (0.16%) is water.

The eastern town line is the border of Albany County.

The Schoharie Creek flows through the central part of the town and is increased by the Little Schoharie Creek and Stony Creek by Middleburgh village. The valley lies to the west of Cannady Hill.

The most prominent geological feature near the town is Vroman's Nose, which is actually in the adjoining town of Fulton and is a popular hiking destination.

New York State Route 30 intersects New York State Route 145 at Middleburgh village.

== Demographics ==
Historical population
| Census | Pop. | Note | %± |
|---|---|---|---|
| 1820 | 3,782 | | — |
| 1830 | 3,266 | | −13.6% |
| 1840 | 3,843 | | 17.7% |
| 1850 | 2,967 | | −22.8% |
| 1860 | 3,249 | | 9.5% |
| 1870 | 3,180 | | −2.1% |
| 1880 | 3,376 | | 6.2% |
| 1890 | 3,007 | | −10.9% |
| 1900 | 2,738 | | −8.9% |
| 1910 | 2,553 | | −6.8% |
| 1920 | 2,109 | | −17.4% |
| 1930 | 1,927 | | −8.6% |
| 1940 | 2,113 | | 9.7% |
| 1950 | 2,460 | | 16.4% |
| 1960 | 2,437 | | −0.9% |
| 1970 | 2,486 | | 2.0% |
| 1980 | 2,980 | | 19.9% |
| 1990 | 3,296 | | 10.6% |
| 2000 | 3,515 | | 6.6% |
| 2010 | 3,746 | | 6.6% |
| 2020 | 3,112 | | −16.9% |
U.S. Decennial Census

As of the census of 2000, there were 3,515 people, 1,383 households, and 945 families residing in the town. The population density was 71.4 inhabitants per square mile (27.6/km^{2}). There were 1,676 housing units at an average density of 34.1 per square mile (13.2/km^{2}). The racial makeup of the town was 97.75% White, 0.37% Black or African American, 0.40% Native American, 0.14% Asian, 0.63% from other races, and 0.71% from two or more races. Hispanic or Latino of any race were 1.88% of the population.

There were 1,383 households, out of which 32.1% had children under the age of 18 living with them, 53.3% were married couples living together, 9.8% had a female householder with no husband present, and 31.6% were non-families. 27.2% of all households were made up of individuals, and 12.2% had someone living alone who was 65 years of age or older. The average household size was 2.51 and the average family size was 3.02.

In the town, the population was spread out, with 26.2% under the age of 18, 6.3% from 18 to 24, 28.3% from 25 to 44, 23.8% from 45 to 64, and 15.5% who were 65 years of age or older. The median age was 38 years. For every 100 females, there were 94.1 males. For every 100 females age 18 and over, there were 90.7 males.

The median income for a household in the town was $34,063, and the median income for a family was $42,056. Males had a median income of $30,203 versus $23,448 for females. The per capita income for the town was $17,560. About 11.5% of families and 15.1% of the population were below the poverty line, including 22.5% of those under age 18 and 12.6% of those age 65 or over.

== Communities and locations in the Town of Middleburgh ==
- Canaday Hill – An elevation in the eastern part of Middleburgh.
- East Cobleskill – A hamlet on the town line in the northwestern part of the town, located on NY-145.
- Huntersland – A hamlet in the southeastern part of the town by Little Schoharie Creek. It was first called Huntersville.
- Middleburgh – The Village of Middleburgh is in the southwestern part of the town at the intersection of NY-30 and NY-145.
- Mill Valley – A valley at the western town line (Line Creek in this valley is the town line).
- West Middleburgh – A hamlet by the southwestern town boundary and the west side of Schoharie Creek (also locally known as "Polly Hollow").

== Politics ==
The current Supervisor of the Town of Middleburgh is James Buzon. He succeeded Denise Richards, who won reelection in 2007 without an opponent. Richards took office after Dick Hanson.

Middleburgh tends to vote overwhelmingly Republican.

== See also ==
- Middleburgh Emergency Volunteer Ambulance Corps
