= National Register of Historic Places listings in Schoharie County, New York =

Location of Schoharie County in New York

List of the National Register of Historic Places listings in Schoharie County, New York

This is intended to be a complete list of properties and districts listed on the National Register of Historic Places in Schoharie County, New York. The locations of National Register properties and districts (at least for all showing latitude and longitude coordinates below) may be seen in a map by clicking on "Map of all coordinates".
This National Park Service list is complete through NPS recent listings posted December 19, 2025.

Contents: Counties in New York
Albany (Albany) – Allegany – Bronx – Broome – Cattaraugus – Cayuga – Chautauqua – Chemung – Chenango – Clinton – Columbia – Cortland – Delaware – Dutchess (Poughkeepsie, Rhinebeck) – Erie (Buffalo) – Essex – Franklin – Fulton – Genesee – Greene – Hamilton – Herkimer – Jefferson – Kings – Lewis – Livingston – Madison – Monroe (Rochester) – Montgomery – Nassau – New York (Below 14th Street, 14th to 59th Streets, 59th to 110th Streets, Above 110th Street, Islands) – Niagara (Niagara Falls) – Oneida – Onondaga (Syracuse) – Ontario – Orange – Orleans – Oswego – Otsego – Putnam – Queens – Rensselaer – Richmond – Rockland – St. Lawrence – Saratoga – Schenectady – Schoharie – Schuyler – Seneca – Steuben – Suffolk – Sullivan – Tioga – Tompkins – Ulster – Warren – Washington – Wayne – Westchester (Northern, Southern, New Rochelle, Peekskill, Yonkers) – Wyoming – Yates

== Listings county-wide ==
	Name on the Register	Image	Date listed	Location	City or town	Description
1	American Hotel	American Hotel	September 9, 1975 (#75001228)	Main St. 42°47′37″N 74°37′03″W	Sharon Springs	
2	Bates Christian Church		August 4, 2023 (#100009194)	1061 Bates Church Rd. 42°26′45″N 74°16′30″W	Broome	
3	Becker Stone House	Becker Stone House	November 20, 1979 (#79001630)	East of Schoharie on Murphy Rd. 42°40′22″N 74°15′08″W	Schoharie	
4	Becker–Westfall House		November 20, 1979 (#79001631)	East of Schoharie on NY 443; 42°40′33″N 74°15′13″W	Schoharie	
5	Bellinger–Dutton House	Bellinger–Dutton House	December 7, 2005 (#05001380)	158 River St. (NY 30); 42°36′15″N 74°20′13″W	Middleburgh	
6	Dr. Christopher S. Best House and Office	Dr. Christopher S. Best House and Office	August 15, 2001 (#01000849)	34 Clauverwie St. 42°35′47″N 74°19′59″W	Middleburgh	
7	Marshall D. Bice House		June 12, 2017 (#100001072)	229 Main St. 42°39′40″N 74°18′58″W	Schoharie	Elaborate 1868 brick Italianate house built by local developer
8	Bramanville Mill	Bramanville Mill	August 27, 1976 (#76001276)	East of Cobleskill on Caverns Rd. 42°41′17″N 74°24′22″W	Cobleskill	
9	Breakabeen Historic District	Breakabeen Historic District	December 31, 1974 (#74001304)	Roughly bounded by River St., new Route 30, and Main St. to Bush Rd. 42°31′27″N 74°23′07″W	Breakabeen	
10	Bunn–Tillapaugh Feed Mill		September 29, 2006 (#06000894)	2 High St. 42°37′59″N 74°33′50″W	Richmondville	
11	Bute–Warner–Truax Farm	Bute–Warner–Truax Farm	July 25, 1985 (#85001611)	Truax Rd. 42°34′22″N 74°39′29″W	Charlotteville	
12	Cobleskill Historic District	Cobleskill Historic District	September 18, 1978 (#78001910)	Irregular pattern along Washington Ave., Main, Grand, and Elm Sts. 42°40′41″N 74°29′03″W	Cobleskill	
13	Colyer House		February 13, 2008 (#08000025)	5729 NY 30; 42°41′43″N 74°17′51″W	Schoharie	
14	First Presbyterian Church of Jefferson		August 7, 2012 (#12000481)	Creamery St. at Park Ave. 42°28′50″N 74°36′48″W	Jefferson	Now a museum
15	Forks in the Road Schoolhouse	Forks in the Road Schoolhouse	July 6, 2005 (#05000665)	115 Lumber Rd. 42°24′43″N 74°33′48″W	South Gilboa	
16	Gallupville Evangelical Lutheran Church	Gallupville Evangelical Lutheran Church	December 31, 2002 (#02001652)	980 NY 443; 42°39′48″N 74°14′04″W	Gallupville	
17	Gallupville House	Gallupville House	September 7, 1979 (#79001629)	Main St. 42°39′46″N 74°13′58″W	Gallupville	
18	Gallupville Methodist Church	Gallupville Methodist Church	May 30, 2001 (#01000584)	Factory St. 42°39′45″N 74°14′03″W	Gallupville	
19	Christian Hess House and Shoemaker's Shop		June 30, 2015 (#15000369)	111 Stony Brook Rd. 42°38′40″N 74°19′12″W	Schoharie	
20	Peter A. Hilton House		September 24, 2004 (#04001063)	6605 NY 10; 42°44′30″N 74°35′24″W	Beekman Corners	
21	House at 461 Spruce Lake Road		January 7, 2015 (#14001130)	461 Spruce Lake Road; 42°35′04″N 74°35′58″W	Summit	A rare remaining stacked plank house from the mid-19th century.
22	Jefferson Historic District		May 12, 2025 (#100011783)	Creamery Street, Main Street, Peck Street and Summit Street; 42°28′52″N 74°36′48″W	Jefferson	
23	Daniel Webster Jenkins House	Daniel Webster Jenkins House	May 4, 2018 (#100002387)	207 Church Street; 42°42′38″N 74°20′19″W	Central Bridge	1884 Queen Anne house built by prominent local citizen who served as local railroad stationmaster
24	Lansing Manor House	Lansing Manor House	May 25, 1973 (#73001268)	2 miles (3.2 km) south of North Blenheim on NY 30; 42°27′04″N 74°27′54″W	Blenheim	
25	Lasell Hall	Lasell Hall	January 11, 2002 (#01001444)	350 Main St. 42°39′45″N 74°18′45″W	Schoharie	
26	Johannes Lawyer Jr. House		February 23, 2016 (#16000039)	194 Main St. 42°39′27″N 74°18′52″W	Schoharie	1790 house dates to post-Revolutionary rebuilding of village, uses a variety of architectural styles
27	John Lehman House		January 4, 2012 (#11001008)	407 Kilts Rd. 42°47′32″N 74°34′59″W	Sharon	
28	Livingstonville Community Church	Livingstonville Community Church	January 9, 2008 (#07001370)	1667 Hauverville Rd. 42°29′24″N 74°16′06″W	Livingstonville	
29	Jacob T. Miers House		December 1, 2015 (#15000857)	103 Knower Ave. 42°39′43″N 74°19′04″W	Schoharie	1871 Second Empire house that has been home to village library for a half-century
30	North Blenheim Historic District	North Blenheim Historic District	December 31, 1974 (#74001303)	Both sides of NY 30, beside Schoharie Creek; 42°28′13″N 74°27′03″W	Blenheim	
31	Old Blenheim Bridge	Old Blenheim Bridge	October 15, 1966 (#66000570)	NY 30 over Schoharie Creek; 42°28′21″N 74°26′29″W	North Blenheim	Destroyed August 28, 2011 in flooding caused by Hurricane Irene
32	Old Lutheran Parsonage	Old Lutheran Parsonage	June 19, 1972 (#72000913)	Adjacent to Spring St. in Lutheran Cemetery; 42°39′42″N 74°18′31″W	Schoharie	
33	Old Stone Fort	Old Stone Fort	December 31, 2002 (#02001643)	145 Fort Rd. 42°40′38″N 74°18′08″W	Schoharie	
34	Parker 13-Sided Barn	Parker 13-Sided Barn	September 29, 1984 (#84002967)	NY 10; 42°28′51″N 74°36′17″W	Jefferson	part of the Central Plan Dairy Barns of New York Thematic Resource (TR)
35	Richmondville United Methodist Church	Richmondville United Methodist Church	July 14, 2006 (#06000575)	266 Main St. 42°37′57″N 74°33′56″W	Richmondville	
36	Schoharie County Courthouse Complex	Schoharie County Courthouse Complex	August 15, 1995 (#95001010)	Main St. 42°39′49″N 74°18′44″W	Schoharie	
37	Schoharie Valley Railroad Complex	Schoharie Valley Railroad Complex	April 26, 1972 (#72000914)	Depot Lane; 42°40′13″N 74°18′39″W	Schoharie	
38	Schoharie Village Historic District		April 5, 2019 (#100003624)	Portions of Main, Bridge, Fair, Grand, Orchard & Prospect Sts., Fort Rd., Academy, Furman & Sunset Drs., Birchez, Depot, Estenes, Mix & Quilt Lns., Johnson, Knower & Shannon Aves. 42°39′49″N 74°18′45″W	Schoharie	Core of village first settled by Palatine Germans in 1710s
39	Shafer Site		November 28, 1980 (#80002764)	Address Restricted	Fulton	
40	Sharon Springs Historic District	Sharon Springs Historic District	June 3, 1994 (#94000541)	Junction of NY 10 and US 20; 42°47′32″N 74°36′56″W	Sharon Springs	
41	South Gilboa Railroad Station	South Gilboa Railroad Station	February 25, 2000 (#00000090)	Bailey Spur Rd. 42°24′36″N 74°33′30″W	South Gilboa	
42	St. John's Lutheran Church		September 12, 2008 (#08000864)	6569 NY 10; 42°44′28″N 74°35′08″W	Beekman Corners	
43	St. Mark's Evangelical Lutheran Church	St. Mark's Evangelical Lutheran Church	July 14, 2006 (#06000572)	326 Main St. 42°35′56″N 74°20′07″W	Middleburgh	
44	St. Paul's Lutheran Church Historic District	St. Paul's Lutheran Church Historic District	September 10, 2014 (#14000584)	312-314 Main St. & Cemetery Ln. 42°39′52″N 74°18′45″W	Schoharie	Church and buildings date to 1740s at earliest, built by Palatine German settlers in region
45	Sternbergh House		March 21, 1985 (#85000629)	Oak Hill Rd. 42°42′06″N 74°18′07″W	Schoharie	
46	Stewart House and Howard–Stewart Family Cemetery		May 8, 2012 (#12000261)	583 NY 10; 42°26′42″N 74°34′56″W	South Jefferson	
47	Abraham Sternberg House	Abraham Sternberg House	September 8, 2010 (#10000726)	150 Route 30A; 42°42′06″N 74°18′15″W	Schoharie	
48	Terpenning–Johnson House and Cemetery		February 5, 2013 (#12001260)	674 Brooker Hollow Rd. 42°37′42″N 74°36′27″W	Brooker Hollow	
49	Upper Middleburgh Cemetery	Upper Middleburgh Cemetery	November 17, 2003 (#03001144)	Huntersland Rd. 42°35′24″N 74°19′08″W	Middleburgh	
50	US Post Office–Middleburgh		May 11, 1989 (#88002352)	300 Main St. 42°35′52″N 74°20′02″W	Middleburgh	part of the US Post Offices in New York State, 1858-1943, TR
51	Col. Peter Vroman House	Col. Peter Vroman House	April 12, 2014 (#100003630)	112 Covered Bridge Rd. 42°40′47″N 74°18′05″W	Schoharie	
52	West Fulton Methodist Church	West Fulton Methodist Church	February 5, 2013 (#12001261)	849 West Fulton Rd. 42°33′49″N 74°27′42″W	West Fulton	
53	Westheimer Site		July 22, 1980 (#80002765)	Address Restricted	Schoharie	
54	George Westinghouse Jr. Birthplace and Boyhood Home	George Westinghouse Jr. Birthplace and Boyhood Home	March 20, 1986 (#86000489)	Westinghouse Rd. 42°42′32″N 74°19′56″W	Central Bridge	

== See also ==
- National Register of Historic Places listings in New York
