= Schoharie, New York (disambiguation) =

Schoharie, New York may refer to:

- Schoharie County, New York
- Schoharie (town), New York, located in Schoharie County
- Schoharie (village), New York, located within the Town of Schoharie
- 2018 Schoharie, New York limousine crash
