= Schoharie =

Schoharie may refer to:

- Schoharie County, New York, USA
  - Schoharie (town), New York, in the above county
    - Schoharie (village), New York, in the above town
- Schoharie Creek, a stream in upstate New York, USA
  - Schoharie Valley, surrounding the above creek
