= Old Lutheran Church =

Old Lutheran Church or Old Lutheran may refer to:

- Old Apostolic Lutheran Church, of America
- Old Lutheran Parsonage, a historic Lutheran church in Schoharie, Schoharie County, New York
- Old Lutherans, German Lutherans in the Kingdom of Prussia
- Independent Lutheran Diocese, founded as Old Lutheran Church in America
- Klemzig, South Australia#Background, Old Lutheran settlement
