= Schoharie limousine crash =

2018 accident in upstate New York

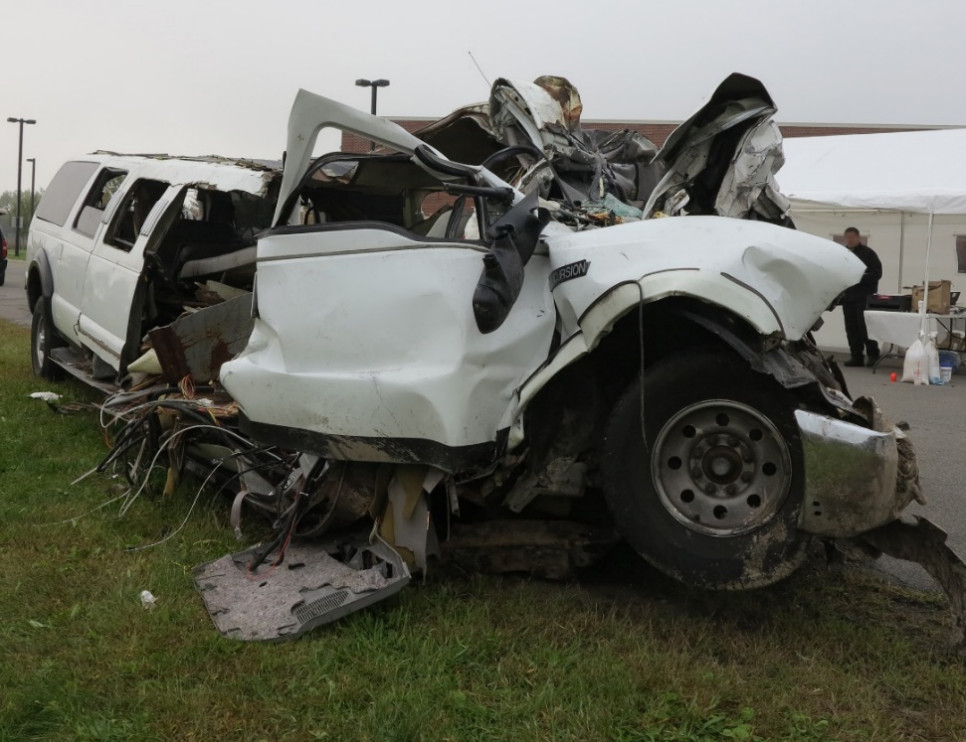
- NTSB photo of limousine after crash
- Date: October 6, 2018
- Time: 1:55 p.m. (EST)
- Location: Intersection of New York state routes 30 and 30A, Schoharie, New York, United States; 42.7001°N 74.3018°W
- Cause: Brake system failure due to inadequate maintenance
- Deaths: 20 (18 in vehicle, 2 bystanders)
- Injuries: 0
- Arrests: 1
- Convicted: Nauman Hussain
- Charges: 20 counts each of second-degree manslaughter and criminally negligent homicide
- Convictions: All counts

The Schoharie limousine crash was a fatal traffic collision which occurred on October 6, 2018. A rented stretch limousine, driven by a chauffeur and with multiple passengers, crashed at the junction of New York state routes 30 and 30A, north of Schoharie and 30 miles (48 kilometers) west of Albany. The crash killed 20: the driver, all 17 passengers, and two pedestrians who were in a nearby parking lot. The passengers were mostly from communities around the Capital District, primarily Amsterdam, and were on their way to celebrate a birthday at Brewery Ommegang near Cooperstown. Among them were four sisters and two recently married couples.

Investigators uncovered problems with the limousine, the driver, and the limousine company. New York State officials had ordered the vehicle removed from service after it failed two inspections due to mechanical problems including deficient brakes; a shop hired to fix the brakes allegedly made inadequate repairs and then falsified their records. The vehicle was certified for only 10 seats but had 18 installed. The driver lacked the required endorsement to his license for carrying 15 or more passengers. The New York State Police (NYSP) determined the operator, Nauman Hussain, was aware of these issues yet continued to rent the vehicle, and he was arrested and indicted on 20 counts each of criminally negligent homicide and second-degree manslaughter. In a September 2021 plea bargain, Hussain pleaded guilty to the charges of criminally negligent homicide on the expectation that he would not be sentenced to prison, but almost a year later withdrew that plea at his sentencing after the judge insisted on some prison time. He was found guilty of all charges in May 2023, and sentenced to 5 to 15 years imprisonment.

Larger issues have been implicated. The National Transportation Safety Board questioned whether safety regulations governing limousines, which critics have called lax, are sufficient to protect passengers; in September 2019, the agency issued an interim report suggesting some passengers may have survived had they worn seat belts, and called on the industry and the state to do more to promote and mandate seat belt use. The intersection of the two highways, which residents found hazardous due to its steep downhill approach, was cited as a possible contributing factor despite efforts by the state to reduce the risk. The victims' families filed civil lawsuits against the limousine operator, the state, a Pakistani tycoon, the repair shop and the store in whose parking lot the two pedestrians were killed.

The crash was, at the time, the deadliest transportation-related disaster in the United States since the 2009 Colgan Air Flight 3407 crash near Buffalo, which killed 50. It was surpassed the following year by the sinking of MV Conception off of Santa Cruz Island, California, which killed 34. It was also the deadliest road transportation disaster in the U.S. since a 2005 bus fire in Wilmer, Texas killed 23 nursing home residents evacuating from the path of Hurricane Rita.

== Background ==
Axel Steenburg and his wife Amy, of Amsterdam, New York, had planned an outing with family and close friends at Brewery Ommegang, south of Cooperstown, to celebrate Amy's 30th birthday on October 6, 2018. Steenburg arranged for a party bus to provide transport. That morning the group, aged 24 to 34, gathered at the Steenburg home. Included were all three of Amy's sisters, two of their husbands, and Axel's brother.

The party had a noon reservation at Ommegang, but that morning Axel Steenburg learned that the bus had broken down and he arranged transportation through Prestige Limousine Services, based in Gansevoort, for $1,475. Prestige sent a stretch limousine, a 2001 Ford Excursion with a capacity of 18 people. (Note: Three of the original invitees had chosen not to attend. Unbeknownst to Steenburg or anyone in his group, the vehicle had failed two inspections earlier that year, and the state Department of Transportation (DOT) had ordered it to be taken out of service in September, with inspectors placing a sticker reading "unserviceable" across its windshield; however, the sticker had been removed.)

=== Driver ===
Prestige driver Scott Lisinicchia had complained about the safety of the company's vehicles. His wife recalled overhearing him on the phone, when the company called with an assignment, complaining that he would not drive a particular vehicle and requesting another one. As a former truck driver, he held a valid commercial driver's license (CDL), but lacked the "P" endorsement required for transport of 15 or more passengers. Lisinicchia had been cited for driving without this endorsement. Due to his outstanding traffic tickets his license should have been suspended. Due to a clerical error, this had not been done.

A couple who had rented the Excursion a year earlier said that Lisinicchia drove erratically, making dangerous maneuvers such as backing up on a busy road to make a turn he had missed. At the time of the crash, Lisinicchia was not listed on the limousine's insurance policy as a driver.

== Crash ==
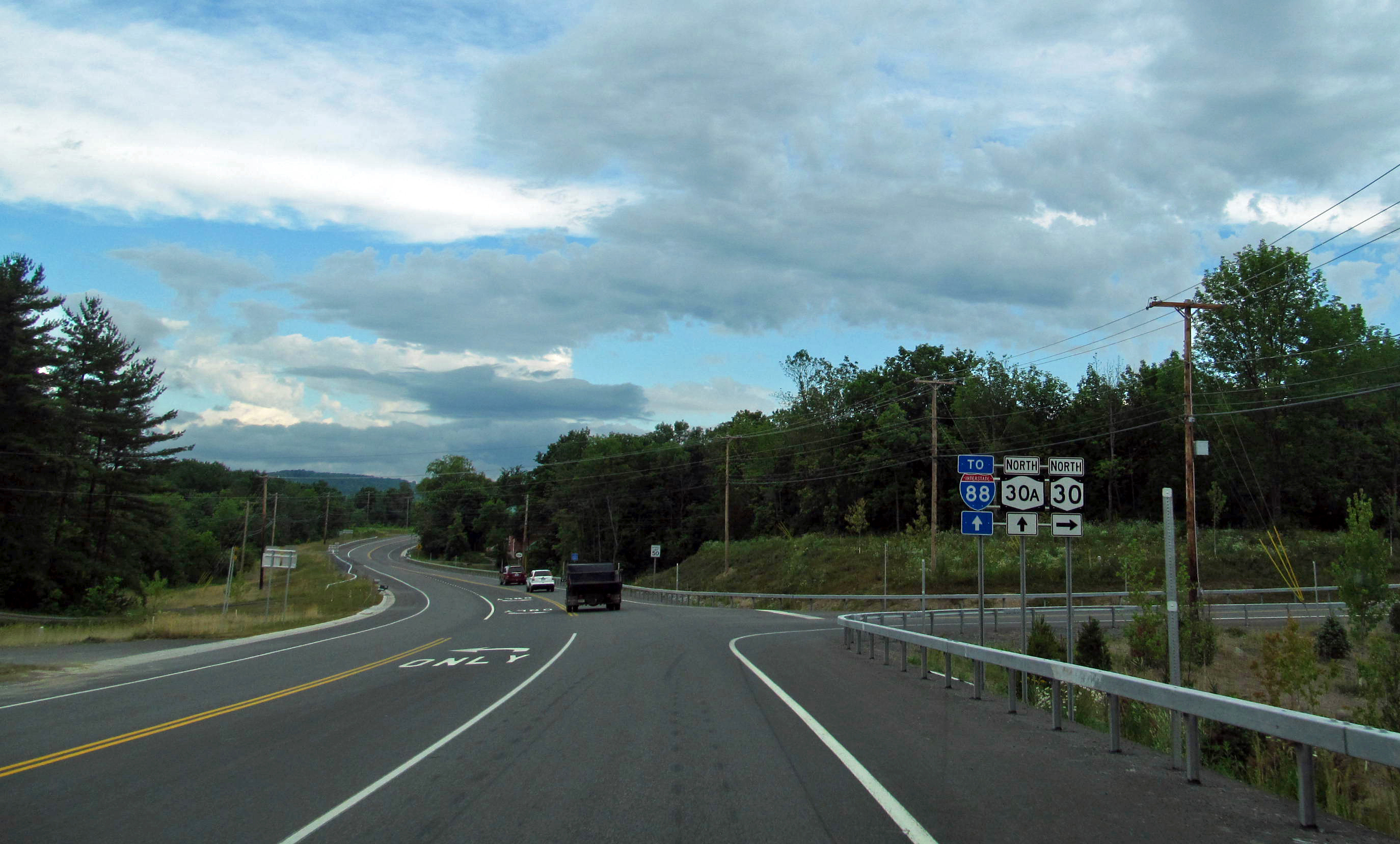
The crash site, photographed in 2012. The limo came down NY 30, from the right, and went across the road into the parking lot that has the driveway at left.

Delayed by the change in vehicle, the group left Amsterdam late. The Excursion left the city and went first west on the New York State Thruway, then south on New York State Route 30A (NY 30A), a long winding two-lane rural road. Why the group chose this route is not known; investigators speculated that stops were planned between Amsterdam and the brewery.

Near Schoharie Creek, NY 30A joins New York State Route 7, which the driver turned left to join. A mile east of that junction, NY 30A leaves the concurrency to continue south towards an interchange with Interstate 88. The Excursion went instead east on NY 7, climbing 520 feet (160 m) in two miles (3.2 km) to its blinkered intersection with New York State Route 30, where it turned right, south, towards Schoharie. Immediately south of the intersection, before NY 30 crosses over I-88, several sets of signs topped by paired orange diamonds warn that trucks are not permitted on this stretch of road and advise them to use NY 7 instead. For those drivers who continue south, many more signs warn drivers about the steep grade ahead, through which the speed limit is 55 miles per hour (89 km/h); a sign located 850 feet (260 m) from the intersection indicates the limit is reduced to 50 miles per hour (80 km/h) at that point.

External videos
- Albany Times-Union video with driver's view of Route 30 from Route 7 to the crash site

The state's crash investigator determined that the vehicle had departed from its course, as the turn to the NY 30 junction is not the most direct route from Amsterdam to Ommegang. It was speculated that the group had either changed their minds completely about the trip, or had decided to stop at the Apple Barrel. Another theory is that Lisinicchia may have been lost. The occupants of a vehicle going south on NY 30 recalled that they had been stopped at the intersection while the Excursion turned. They described Lisinicchia's appearance as "confused" and "frazzled", and noted that immediately after turning, the vehicle pulled over onto the shoulder and put its flashers on. They believe this occurred less than two minutes before the crash based on the driver's own experience of traveling the road. The witness recalled that the Excursion slowly rolled forward although its backup lights and back-up beepers were on. They continued past it. A passenger in the vehicle said that they saw Lisinicchia pointing toward the valley.

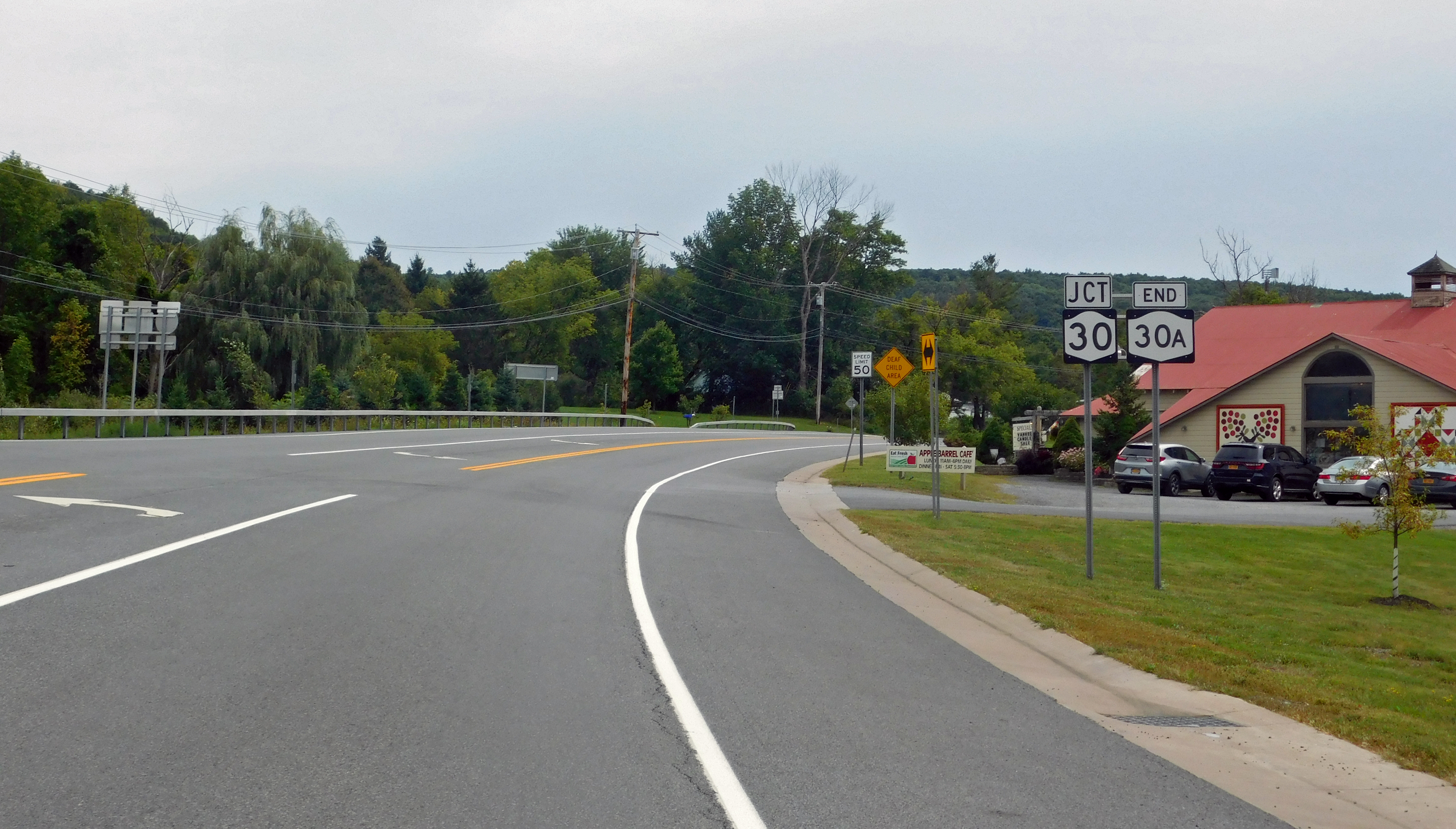
View of the intersection from north, showing the Apple Barrel, almost a month before the crash

At the bottom of the hill is a right-angled three-way intersection where NY 30A forks off to the north while NY 30 turns southward toward Schoharie, two miles (3.2 km) away. Southbound traffic on NY 30 is required to stop; a sign warns of this several hundred feet uphill of the intersection. When the Excursion reached the junction, at 1:55 p.m., it did not stop and was, according to witnesses, going very fast. The witness who had earlier seen the Excursion on the side of the road recalled that after they stopped at the intersection, they saw the limousine coming downhill behind them, its speed increasing. They recalled that the vehicle's engine was loud, almost sounding like a jet. They feared they would be hit but at the last second it swerved around them.

The vehicle continued into the parking lot of the nearby Apple Barrel Country Store where it struck a parked 2015 Toyota Highlander and came to a stop in a gully.

== Victims ==
Two pedestrians attempting to flee were struck and killed by the Highlander as it was propelled into a drainage ditch 50 feet (15 m) away. All 18 people in the limousine died, with all but two pronounced dead at the scene. The other two were transported to a hospital in nearby Cobleskill, where one was pronounced dead on arrival; the other was transferred by helicopter to Albany Medical Center and pronounced dead there.

== Investigations ==
Investigators from the National Transportation Safety Board (NTSB) went to the scene of the crash. A state trooper told reporters that the state police had deployed a reconstruction unit, facial identification and a drone in order to gather data about the crash and the victims.

NTSB head Robert Sumwalt told reporters two days after the crash that it was too early to say whether the limo had been speeding at the time; the agency was focusing on human and mechanical factors as causes. It was, however, a "high-energy impact" that had severely damaged the front and left portions of the vehicle, driving the engine into the passenger compartment. There were no skid marks on the pavement, suggesting the driver had not applied the brakes, or that they had not been functioning well, before reaching the stop sign. Investigators would be looking at the airbag control module for data that might answer their questions.

Robert Patnaude, commander of NYSP Troop G, said on October 9 that his agency was treating the case as a criminal investigation due to the level of negligence possibly involved.

In August 2020 the NTSB announced it would hold a hearing at the end of September to consider the draft final report.

=== Conflict between NTSB and state police over access to vehicle ===
The NYSP investigation led to conflicts with the NTSB. Since the former investigation is a criminal case, it takes priority, and the limousine remains in NYSP custody until it is finished. The NTSB was not listed on the original search warrant, which was apparently interpreted as disallowing them access to the vehicle, despite the issuing judge's belief to the contrary. Almost two weeks after the crash, the federal investigators complained privately to the Associated Press that they had not been able to even look over the vehicle.

On October 22, the NYSP announced that Hussain's defense team and the prosecution would be allowed to look at the limousine, and that NTSB investigators had been able to look at the vehicle's exterior but not examine its internal mechanics. The next day, Senator Charles Schumer told the media that an NTSB investigator had been "granted limited access" to the limousine. The NYSP confirmed this and noted that it was not the first time the NTSB had been able to view the Excursion. However, full examination was not permitted until the criminal investigation had concluded, an issue the NYSP said the NTSB was fully aware of. The state police promised the NTSB full access to the limo. Schumer said that the NTSB would likely release a report on the crash in three months; and a board spokesman clarified that that report would likely be preliminary. The investigation, and the full final report, could possibly take a year or two.

In late December, the NTSB went public with a letter to Susan Mallery, the Schoharie County district attorney, alleging that the delays may have compromised evidence. Mallery and the NYSP expressed concerns that the NTSB might release information that could compromise the criminal investigation, and that federal investigators might be called as witnesses in a criminal trial. The NTSB objected to a request by the state to remove the transmission and torque converter from the vehicle without NTSB investigators present, since evidence could be destroyed. The NTSB had still not been added to the search warrant due to a delay from Mallery. The dispute continued through late December and early January, with the district attorney's office arguing that the NTSB had been granted more access to the vehicle than claimed; the NTSB called the district attorney obstructionist and deceptive, claiming that their investigators had only been allowed to observe the vehicle from a distance and were prohibited from making measurements or taking photographs, being told that these actions could compromise the criminal investigation without being told how. Schoharie County Court Judge George Bartlett attempted to resolve the dispute by amending the search warrant to explicitly allow the NTSB to access the vehicle, ordering the NYSP not to move it while the parties negotiated.

In mid-January the NTSB and Mallery's office agreed that the board's investigators would be recalled from their furlough due to the government shutdown and allowed to examine the Excursion, then stored in a tent. A more permanent structure would be erected to shelter the limousine. However, a spokesperson for Capital District congressman Paul Tonko stressed that "while progress has been made, terms for a final agreement remain unresolved." In late January, Bartlett was able to broker an agreement between Mallery, the state police, Nauman Hussain's defense attorney Lee Kindlon, and the NTSB, allowing the federal investigators to photograph the limousine and take some scrapings. However, they could not take any brake fluid from the vehicle since there is too little to share.

In early February the limo was moved to a special protective shed built by the NTSB. Joe Tacopina, newly retained as Nauman Hussain's defense attorney, suggested that Mallery's efforts to keep the federal agency from examining the vehicle was an attempt to protect a weak case.

The supplemental search warrant ordering the state police to remove the transmission and torque converter was signed on January 30. Lawyers for the victims' survivors, only one of whom at that time had served Hussain with paperwork, expressed concern that they had not been able to access the vehicle. They feared that crucial evidence might be destroyed or altered by the investigation.

=== State police ===
The state police concentrated their investigation on factors specific to the crash: the vehicle, its driver and its owner/operator Prestige Limousine.

==== Vehicle ====
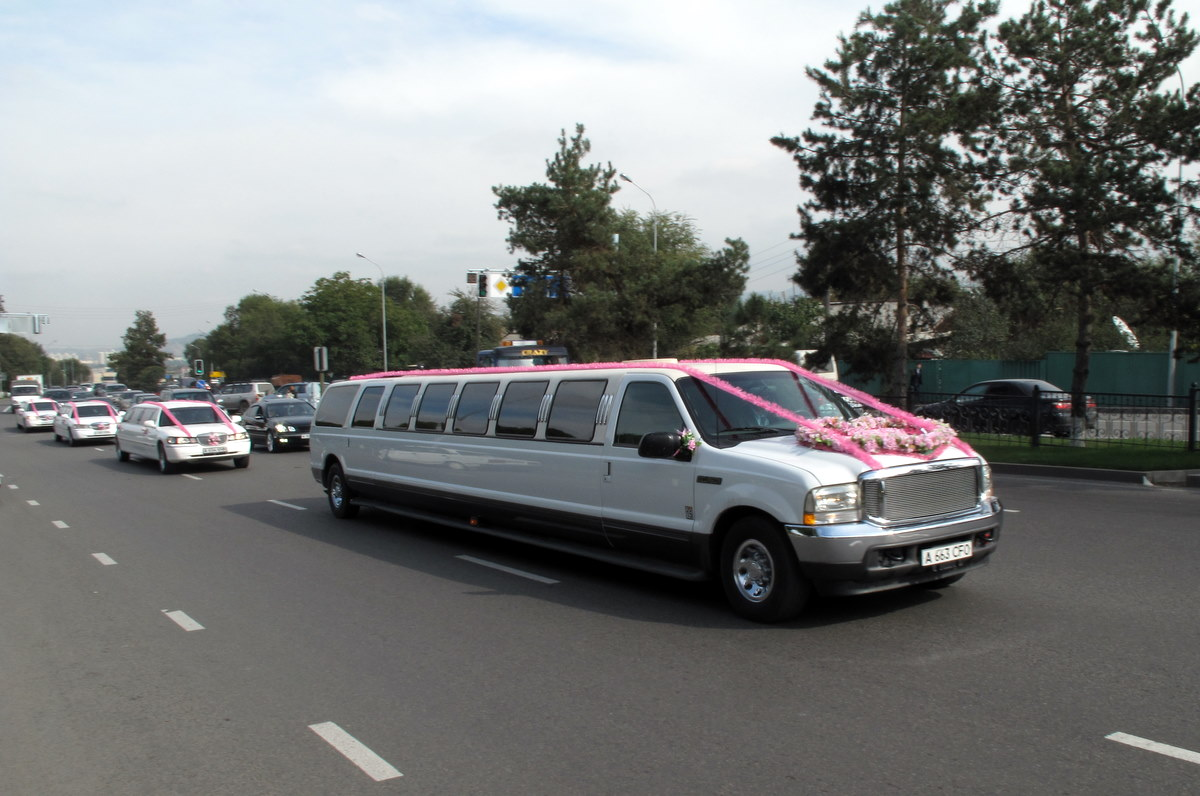
2000–2004 Ford Excursion stretch limousine, similar to the one involved by configuration

The owner of an Albany limousine company that sold Prestige the Excursion in 2016 claimed it had been in good working order at that time and had passed its last inspection. However, a driver from another company that shared limousines with Prestige told WTEN that he had driven the Excursion in 2015 and it was "absolutely unsafe". The brakes barely worked, and when the vehicle had begun smoking during a prom, the children's parents refused to let them ride in it. The driver claimed that the operators performed only minimal maintenance work. After leaving the company he reported the vehicle to the state. A couple who rented the vehicle a year before the crash claimed that it was in poor condition and had an unusually loud engine. Prestige driver James Pachter said that he refused to drive the Excursion for 18 months leading up to the crash due to its inadequate brakes.

Two days before the crash, the limousine was listed for sale on Craigslist with an asking price of $9,000; the seller claimed it was "DOT ready" and was in "excellent condition" with 180,000 miles (290,000 km) on it. The seller was not explicitly identified but the phone number was one that Prestige had used.

A victim texted a relative shortly before the crash with concerns about the vehicle's condition, calling it a "junker" and saying that its engine was unusually loud. Three minutes later, another victim texted her fiancé that the brakes were burning and the vehicle was coasting.

New York Governor Andrew Cuomo said in an October 8 news conference that the limo was a "chopped vehicle", cut and extended to 34 feet (10 m) long, 15 feet (4.6 m) more than its original length, with added seats. It would thus need a federal certificate to operate, which it lacked. The Excursion had also failed inspection in September 2018 due to the absence of this certificate along with mechanical problems including a perpetually lit anti-lock brake warning indicator light, a dangling brake line, defective emergency exits and defective windshield wipers; hence, the limo was illegal to operate on public roads in the state until those issues were corrected. Similar issues had been found in a March spot inspection and the Excursion had been driven 1,300 miles (2,100 km) since then. In March, the vehicle had been cited for having 18 seats installed, in excess of its designed passenger capacity of 10. Different license plates were affixed to the limousine at its March and September inspections.

A prosecution expert's report on the causes of the crash ascribed it to "catastrophic brake failure due to the neglect of mandated commercial vehicle inspections and maintenance by company personnel". The consultant found the brake pads corroded and the tubing to the rear brakes deficient, having failed to work at the time of the crash. The expert examined the soles of the driver's shoes, noting that his right loafer was severely deformed, with an imprint of the tread on the brake pedal suggesting he was desperately trying to stop the Excursion.

==== Driver ====
Toxicology tests revealed that Lisinicchia had "significant amounts" of marijuana and traces of anti-seizure medication in his system when he died. The marijuana levels suggested regular use. His family's attorney argued that the marijuana levels did not necessarily indicate impairment at the time of the crash.

==== Company ====
Prestige was ordered to cease and desist limousine operations until further notice. Investigations revealed that other Prestige vehicles had failed inspections in the past. The company's owner, Shahed Hussain, was provisionally identified by The New York Times as a former Federal Bureau of Investigation (FBI) informant in the 2009 Bronx terrorism plot, previously having been investigated in a scheme to sell false identification while he was employed at the state's Department of Motor Vehicles. Police were unable to interview him after the crash as he had returned to his native Pakistan, reportedly for health reasons. The day after his departure, the March inspection found the limousine unserviceable.

The DOT held a hearing into Prestige's failures to maintain the vehicle on October 6, 2017—exactly a year before the crash. No one from Prestige attended, which could have resulted in a default fine of up to $5,000. Mallery said that Nauman Hussain's improper registration of the Excursion as a livery vehicle—allowing him to get the vehicle inspected under less stringent Department of Motor Vehicles (DMV) standards rather than those of the DOT—demonstrated criminal intent.

During the first six months of 2018, Global Liberty, Prestige's insurance company, canceled coverage on the Excursion six times. When this happens, the DMV automatically revokes the vehicle's registration, restoring it only when the owner regains coverage; otherwise the license plates must be surrendered. The limousine's registration had been restored for the sixth time the day before the crash. The reasons for Global Liberty's actions are not known; the company would not comment.

Prestige failed to attend an April DOT hearing where they could have either offered proof that violations found during the March inspection had been addressed, or contested the agency's claim. Since they did neither, they were fined $700, less than the company charged to rent the limousine. The state cashed the check from Prestige, its records show, but took no further action. In August a state trooper specializing in commercial vehicle enforcement wrote a violation notice, but no tickets, when he observed the Excursion conducting passenger operations without being marked with the owner's name and United States Department of Transportation (USDOT) number as required by law. A final hearing was held on October 5, 2018, the day before the crash; again Prestige did not appear.

Other limousine company operators said that the state diligently enforced its regulations and questioned how Prestige was able to continue operations. One owner said that if more than 20 percent of an operator's vehicles have been declared unserviceable, the state can force it to cease operations, an order only a court can override; records showed that Prestige had 80 percent of its vehicles unserviceable at the time of the crash. Analysts found that, while the state DOT has been proactive in inspecting vehicles, it has a poor record of following up to ensure that repairs were made. A 2017 federal audit found that the DOT verified repairs on only one percent of the vehicles it inspects. The state comptroller's office had likewise found in a 2014 audit that of the out-of-service violations it issues, no written record of repair existed for 40 percent, another 25 percent were filed later than the mandated 15 days after the violation, and some certifications were found to be false.

After the crash, Nauman Hussain told police that he was running the company until his father Shahed returned. Pachter, the driver who had earlier refused to operate the Excursion, said that Shahed was typically absent and that Nauman ran the company even when Shahed was around. In February 2019 it was reported that Shahed had moved to Dubai in the United Arab Emirates, which has no extradition treaty with the U.S.; however, Nauman's attorney maintained that Shahed was in Pakistan. Two months later, prosecutors alleged that on several occasions after his father left the country, Nauman Hussain claimed to be Shahed when DOT inspectors contacted him about the Excursion, only admitting his true identity when they visited the business. Nauman's attorney claimed that the pretense was not malicious and was intended only to prevent people from questioning his authority to speak on his father's behalf.

According to the trooper who had written the August 2018 violation notice, Nauman claimed that the limousine was unlawfully operating unmarked because he was establishing his own limousine rental company and merely borrowing the vehicle from Prestige.

=== NTSB ===
While the NTSB is also interested in what the state police have learned about the Excursion, Lisinicchia and Prestige, they are also looking into some larger issues raised by the crash that could have contributed to not only it but other crashes: the state of limousine regulation generally, and the design of the intersection. In February 2019 the agency released a preliminary report describing the facts of the crash but saying that the investigation into its cause was ongoing.

==== Limousine safety regulation ====
"This didn't have to happen", Helaine Olen wrote in a Washington Post column after the crash. "There are massive loopholes in the federal safety regulations governing limousines". Primarily, she wrote, vehicles that have to meet strict safety standards when manufactured do not have to be re-examined after being expanded. Efforts to change this at the federal and state level have generally failed in the face of vigorous opposition from the industries involved.

Raul Arbalaez, an engineer with the Insurance Institute for Highway Safety, agreed. "They don't have to go back and prove that they meet any of the crash safety criteria", he said of vehicle expanders and the limousine operators. The Excursion that crashed in Schoharie, he speculated, likely weighed at least 10,000 pounds (4,500 kg; 4.5 t), even without accounting for its passengers. "That is a lot to ask of the same four tires and brakes that vehicle came with."

Among the violations found by state inspectors prior to the crash, the limousine did not have the legally required manufacturer's tag identifying the company that had expanded it. Attempts by the Times Union to determine who had done so were unsuccessful. The vehicle was originally sold unaltered at a Ford dealership in St. Charles, Missouri, which no longer had records of the sale, and the manager of the dealership did not recall selling it to a limousine company. The two biggest limousine companies in the area denied having worked on it, and one pointed to a group of defunct California companies. New York records showed the vehicle's odometer had 2,058 miles (3,312 km) on it when it was bought by Albany-area Royale Limousine, whose owner would not say who had expanded it; at the time, it had nine seats, half the number it had when it crashed. Kindlon said that all the modifications to the limousine predated ownership by Prestige, and that they, too, were attempting to verify the builder, as the modifications may have been related to the crash. The NTSB later determined that the vehicle had been originally purchased by 21st Century Coachworks in Rogersville, Missouri, who sectioned it, extended the frame 144 inches (370 cm) and added three bench seats in the new rear passenger compartment. The NTSB was also unable to find any evidence that the vehicle had ever received the required Federal Motor Vehicle Safety Standards tag. Missouri state records showed that two companies in Rogersville had used "21st Century" in their names, but both went out of business around the same time in 2003, their principals were deceased and the men's widows could not be reached.

After it was reported that the Excursion had been cited several times for insufficient braking capacity of less than 80 percent of the designed capacity, Frank Figueroa, a California vehicle constructor who had not worked on the Excursion, said that constricted brake lines may have been to blame. While the original brake lines to the front wheels are retained when a vehicle is expanded into a limousine, he said, it is necessary to extend those that reach the rear wheels. The extended lines are usually made of steel, to avoid any risk of obstruction or constriction. He maintained that, as it had an 11,000-pound (5,000 kg) towing capacity as originally manufactured, the Excursion should have been able to come to a complete stop at the intersection with the original braking system in place.

Another issue relevant to the crash was seat belt requirements, or the lack thereof, for passengers in limousines. New York, like many states, only requires passengers in the front seat to use them. Expanders are not even required to add them, nor any additional side airbags. "[W]earing seat belts does save lives", Sumwalt told the media. "Whether or not it would've made a difference here or not, that remains to be seen." Peter Goelz, a former NTSB managing director, said the crash would be "a watershed event for the limousine industry", as he predicted that the lack of or failure to use seat belts would be cited as a major cause for the loss of life in the crash and rules would be changed to require them. The board's preliminary report, however, noted that the seats added to the vehicle did have lap belts but not whether they were in use at the time of the crash.

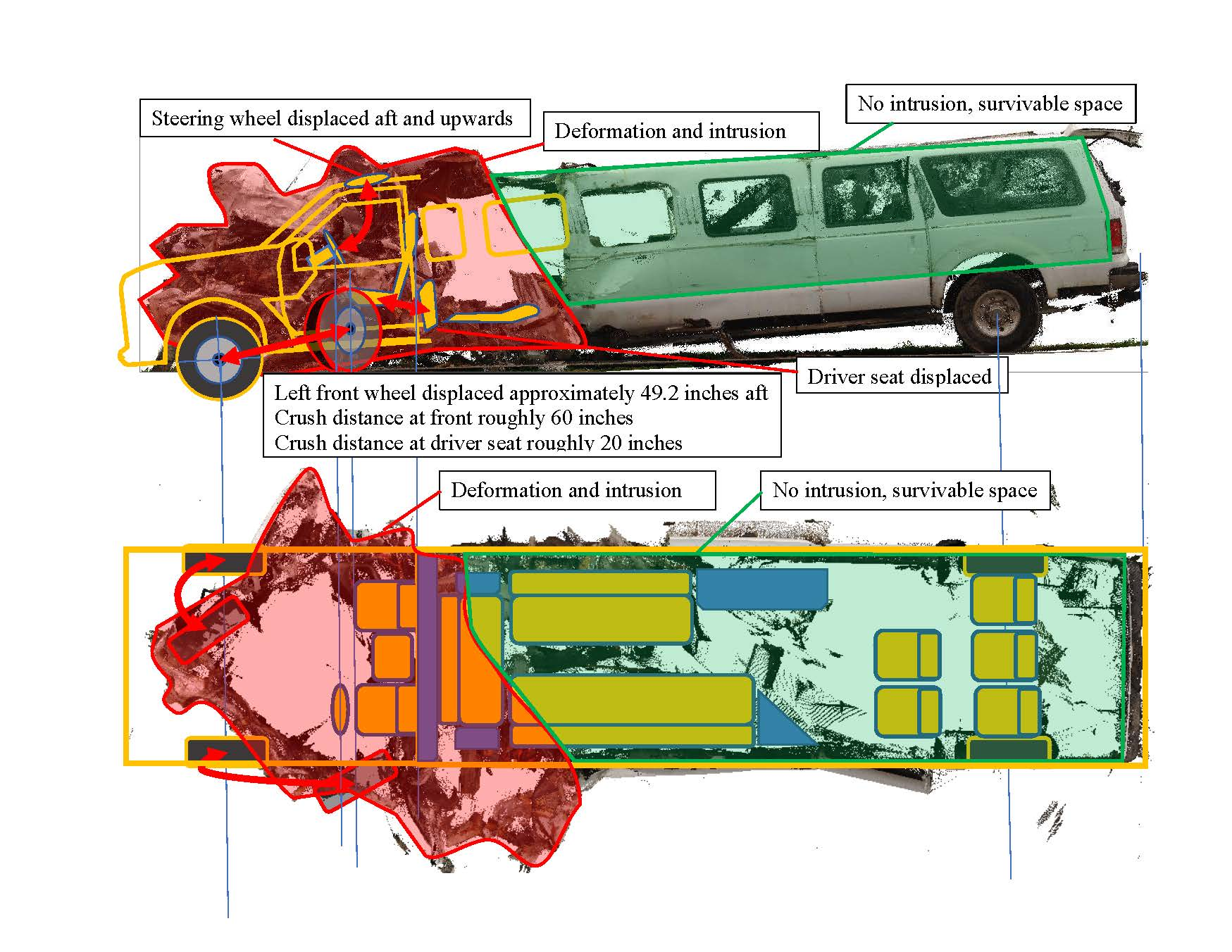
NTSB diagram from HSR1902, contrasting destruction of front with relatively intact rear passenger compartments

The NTSB issued Safety Recommendation Report HSR1902 in September 2019, entitled Providing Occupant Protection for Limousine Passengers. In the report, the NTSB determined the crash was not survivable for the limousine driver, as the front seating compartment suffered a "complete loss of occupant survival space". The rear passenger compartment was able to retain survival space, but the additional seats and seat belt restraints installed during the limousine extension were not adequately anchored, nor were they properly designed for crash protection.

In addition, although the seats originally installed by Ford remained attached to the floor and intact, none of the occupants were wearing seat belts at the time of the crash; the seat belts for the aftermarket seats were under the seats and inaccessible. As a result, the NTSB issued a recommendation to the National Highway Traffic Safety Administration, asking the National Highway Traffic Safety Administration to mandate minimum performance standards for aftermarket seats installed in vehicles modified into limousines. The NTSB also recommended that limousine operators encourage passengers to wear seat belts, and that mandated state inspections should check that seat belts are functional and accessible.

=== Federal and state responses ===
After a 2015 limousine crash on Long Island that killed four, Schumer, the Senate's then minority leader, had asked the NTSB to study limousine crashes as the beginning of an effort to improve safety and regulation. He and Kirsten Gillibrand, New York's other U.S. Senator, along with Connecticut senator Richard Blumenthal, again wrote to the board after the crash, saying it pointed to the need to improve regulation and safety standards for limousines and the companies that operate them. New York state legislators also have introduced bills to improve limousine safety.

State senator Simcha Felder's bill would ban the use of any stretch limousines older than 10 years and require a minimum of $2 million in liability insurance coverage, as well as changing procedures for vehicles that fail inspection. Assemblywoman Amy Paulin, who has made limousine safety a cause since 2006, introduced several bills in her chamber to implement recommendations made by a grand jury that investigated the 2015 crash, including requiring seat belt use.

A lobbyist for the industry told the Times-Union that many of these bills seemed premature since the cause of the crash was not yet known and the state's regulations for limos were already among the strictest in the U.S. Nonetheless, the state has already made some administrative responses, changing responsibility for inspecting limos to the DMV from the DOT and reclassifying any vehicle designed to carry more than nine passengers in addition to the driver as a bus.

In January 2019 the Times-Union reported that state police had seized the license plates of 59 limousines owned by companies whose registrations had been suspended for failure to comply with state DOT safety regulations; later the paper reported that the DMV had "blacklisted" the vehicle identification numbers of those limousines from which it had removed plates to prevent them from being re-registered under new ownership. DMV officials declined to respond to the paper's questions as to why this had not been done to the Excursion before the crash, despite having been pulled over twice after being ordered off the road, citing the ongoing criminal investigation. "The state is acting affirmatively to crack down on bad actors who put innocent New Yorkers in danger", a spokesman said. The article noted that such an action might not have prevented Prestige from operating the limo, since, at the September 2018 inspection, the company had put a second set of plates on not only the Excursion, but onto a Lincoln Town Car that had also been ruled unserviceable earlier that year.

At his news conference announcing his state budget proposal shortly afterwards, Cuomo announced a package of sweeping reforms to state limousine safety regulation, reforms suggested not only by the Schoharie crash but the 2015 Long Island crash that killed four women on their way to a bachelorette party. The centerpiece of the reform package was an outright ban on stretch limousines similar to the Excursion; the governor also called for criminal penalties, some of them felonies, for vehicle owners and inspection stations that circumvent regulations as Prestige and its inspectors allegedly did. He also proposed prohibiting limousines from making U-turns, requiring inspection stations to report attempts to bring unauthorized vehicles in for inspection, and ending the state's exemption from seatbelt laws for passengers in all vehicles for hire.

After heavy lobbying by limousine operators, Cuomo left the stretch ban out of his state budget proposal in late February, although the other measures remained. Trade organizations for the limo industry applauded the move, saying it would have forced many operators in the state to sell their fleets and go out of business. However, an auto body shop owner whose niece, Rachel Cavosie, was one of the victims, criticized Cuomo for doing so, saying the governor had "abandon[ed] the families of 20 people".

When the budget did pass in early April, several reform measures were included. A felony offense for operating a limousine that causes a death was created, civil penalties for operating one without authority and/or in violation of safety regulations were increased as were liability insurance coverage requirements. The authority of DOT and the state police to confiscate the license plates of non-compliant limousines was clarified, and DMV inspection stations were required, under pain of certification suspension, to report any attempt by a vehicle under DOT's jurisdiction, such as a limousine, to attempt to get a DMV inspection instead. Stretch limousines were also forbidden to make U-turns.

==== Configuration of intersection ====
The family that owns the Apple Barrel Country Store told reporters that the intersection and hill are a recurring issue. Sumwalt confirmed to the media that his agency will be looking at the configuration of the junction as a possible contributing factor. "We do know that there have been other crashes at this intersection," he said. "[S]o we want to see: Were there factors in the roadway itself that could have led to the conditions of this crash?"

The intersection was originally configured as a Y, slightly uphill of its present location, which was more developed in the early 20th century and today's NY 30A was part of NY 43. After World War II, NY 30, which had followed the course northeast that 30A does today, was realigned to its present course, and the intersection reconfigured into a Y with Route 43 following a new road, parallel to a former rail corridor, that forked off south of the original intersection; the portion that had led west from the intersection to the realignment was vacated. In 1960 Route 43 was truncated to end at its junction with NY 30 in Schoharie; the portion north of the NY 30 intersection was made part of NY 30A, newly created at the behest of the Fulton County Automobile Club.

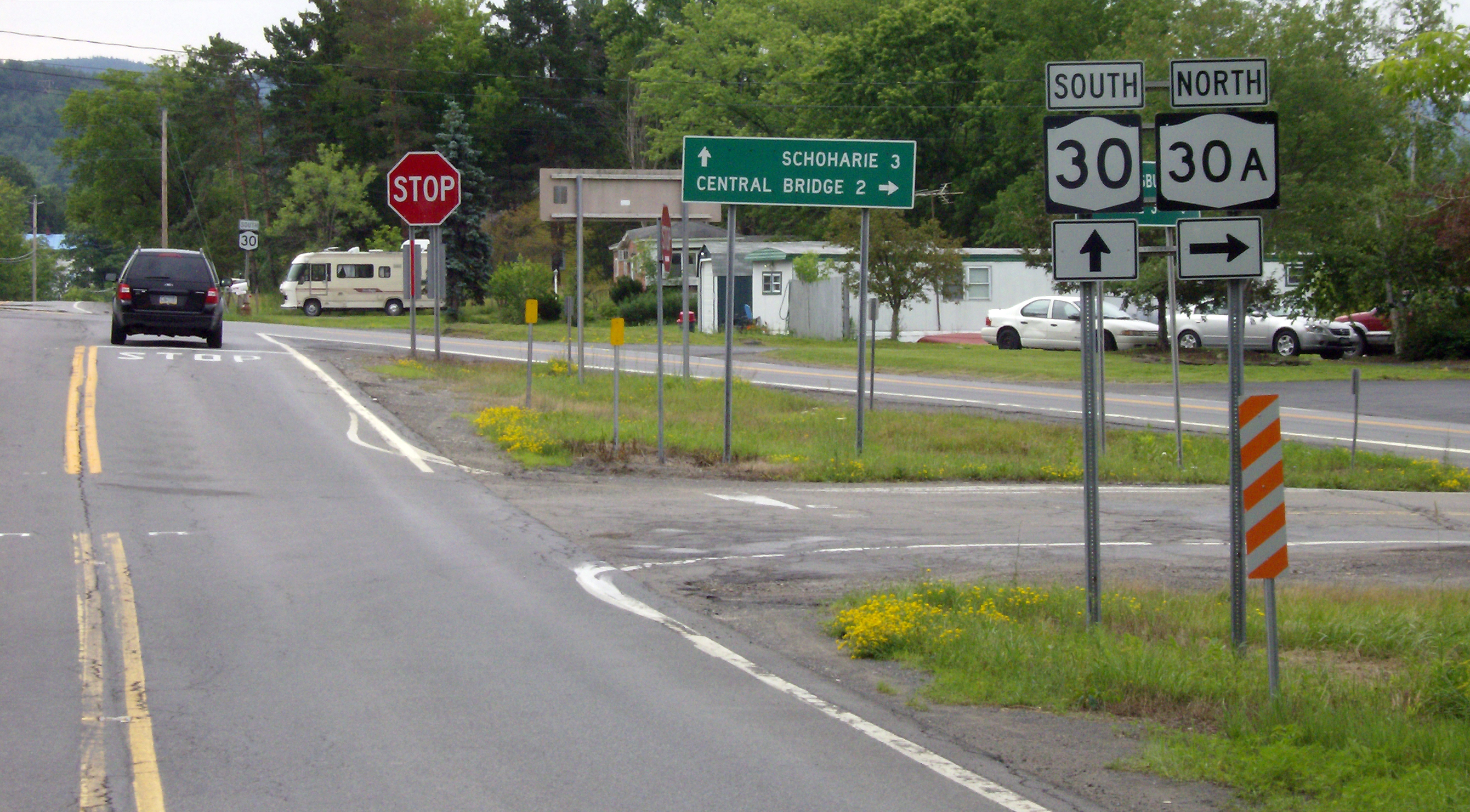
View of the junction from southbound NY 30 in 2008, just before reconfiguration and south of the later crash site

This configuration of the intersection necessitated that traffic on southbound 30 not only stop at the bottom of the hill but turn left just before doing so. After Interstate 88 was built through the area in the early 1980s, with an exit on NY 30A a mile north of the intersection serving both roads, NY 30 was likewise realigned to clear a corridor for the interstate. Its brief concurrency with NY 7 two miles (3.2 km) northeast of the 30A junction was replaced with a four-way intersection, and a new, curved section along the hillside replaced the previous straight descent to the intersection. With the interstate access, trucks began using that section of Route 30 more, sometimes having crashes at the bottom of the hill when their brakes failed.

Residents in the intersection's vicinity, and Schoharie's town board, asked the state to do something about it. After a fatal crash in 2008, the state DOT began a multiyear project to reconfigure the intersection a third time, straightening Route 30 to make a T intersection with 30A. When it was completed, vehicles over 18 short tons (16 t) were banned from the section of the highway between routes 7 and 30A; those traveling south on Route 30 must follow Route 7 down to Route 30A just north of the I-88 exit. The weight limit was eventually lowered to 5 short tons (4.5 t) and, by the end of 2015, banned all trucks. Schoharie town supervisor Alan Tavenner told The New York Times that he believed the intersection had become more dangerous since then, (Note: "Mr. Tavenner said the site of the accident was a notoriously dangerous spot, a 'nasty intersection' that transportation officials had tried to fix in the past without success. 'I honestly think it was a more dangerous intersection than it was before,' he said.") but two days later said to reporters from Gannett News Service that the required truck detours "seem to have helped" lower crashes at the site. The family who own the Apple Barrel stated that crashes still occur.

Four days after the crash, The Daily Gazette filed a request with DOT under the state's Freedom of Information Law for emails to and from its resident engineer for Schoharie County, and the department's regional engineer, "concerning safety or concerns about safety or accidents". DOT refused the request, saying public disclosure of those requests could interfere with the ongoing investigation by the state police. In December, the newspaper decried this in an editorial: "Explain to the public exactly how releasing information already prepared by state officials and known within the DOT about this intersection is going to impede a police investigation into the crash." It doubted that it would, and noted that any statistical data in those records was not covered by that exemption and should be disclosed.

In August 2019, the state DOT announced it would not be changing the speed limit on the section of Route 30 going downhill into the crash site. Morrissey said that not only were the posted limits in accord with engineering standards, "[t]here is also absolutely no indication that the posted speed limit in this area contributed in any way to the tragic crash last October." Sal Ferlazzo, who had filed a civil suit against the state and Hussain over the crash for the family of victim Amanda Rivenburg, disputed that claim, saying a former DOT engineer he had retained as an expert witness said the placement of a 50-mile-per-hour (80 km/h) speed limit sign so close to the intersection was "a major design error". In an editorial, the Schenectady Daily Gazette, after facetiously wondering if the state was afraid the speed limit could sue it over being lowered, asked what harm might be done by lowering the speed limit. "Urging drivers to slow down as they near an intersection is never a bad thing."

A year after the crash, Floyd Guernsey, a Schoharie town councilman who lived near the intersection, recounted at a meeting that he had seen more crashes than he could count there, even since October 2018. He suggested that the only solution would be permanently closing Route 30 at the top of the hill. "I think most people would be fine with taking the extra two minutes to go around", he said, suggesting a barricade at the top of the hill would be as much a monument to the victims as the actual monument then planned for the site. Tavenner agreed but reminded the board that the state DOT would have to agree, and the board resolved to make that request.

=== Inspection stations ===
The limousine had an inspection sticker from a DMV inspection station and carried livery license plates, both of which technically violated New York law for a vehicle that could carry more than 10 passengers. Such vehicles had, since 2011, been subject to inspection by the DOT, and privately operated repair shops could not inspect them without a waiver allowing them to do so. Both the truck stop in Wilton that had issued the Excursion its first sticker in July 2016, and the Mavis Discount Tire in Saratoga Springs that had issued the second one in May 2018, 10 months after the first one had lapsed, were still offering inspections. Neither business would comment. The DMV likewise refused to say whether it had taken any action, citing the ongoing criminal investigation.

The Excursion had previously come to DOT's attention in June 2017 when one of its investigators saw the Excursion in the Saratoga Springs Mavis lot and noticed that it had livery plates. He checked the car's registration and found it was approved for 11 seats; records showed it was registered to Hussain's companies and address. He was unsuccessful in contacting them until January 2018, after which he issued a violation notice; in April, he was able to inspect the vehicle, and ordered it off the road, he told state police.

In late 2019, a former manager at Mavis told investigators that the shop had falsified records of repairs, including those it supposedly performed on the Excursion, in order to meet corporate sales quotas. In May 2018, he had purchased a brake master cylinder for the limousine, but it was not installed although Prestige was billed for the work. Other brake work supposedly done on the vehicle at other times had also not been done, he claimed. The allegations led to two hearings before a DMV administrative law judge who fined Mavis $9,000 but declined to revoke the store's licenses to carry out inspections, proceedings not reported publicly until 2023.

Hussain's defense team suggested that their client had been deceived by Mavis as well, and that the shop's fraudulent practices were the real cause of the crash. A Mavis spokesman defended the chain's business practices and said many of the defense's claims were inaccurate, but would not elaborate. Paul Davenport, who had, as attorney for Erin and Shane McGowan's families, sued Mavis, said that, even if the defense claims were true, Hussain was still at least civilly liable, since passenger safety was his responsibility. Mallery concurred, writing that there were other problems with the Excursion's brakes that a diligent owner would have become aware of and addressed. The prosecution's expert concluded the master cylinder was functional and had recently been replaced at the time of the crash, she noted. Hussain's lawyers continued to blame Mavis.

== Arrest of Nauman Hussain ==
On October 10, state police arrested Nauman Hussain in Watervliet and charged him with criminally negligent homicide, a Class E felony, the least serious under New York law. He was taken to County Court in Cobleskill and arraigned, after which he pleaded not guilty to the charge, posted $150,000 bond and was released. Mallery asked for higher bail than usual, and for the court to require that Hussain surrender his passports, claiming he was a flight risk; she told the court that his vehicle was found packed with his personal belongings and several suitcases. Hussain had not been fleeing, Kindlon maintained, but moving house in response to death threats he had received; investigators did not find that claim credible.

A DOT spokesman had previously stated that, after failing the September inspection, a large sticker indicating the Excursion was "unserviceable" was placed on the windshield; the sticker also warned that anyone other than an inspector who removes it can be fined for doing so. It was found, crumpled, on the front seat of Hussain's personal vehicle after his arrest.

The arrest was not Hussain's first. In a 2014 traffic stop in Cohoes, police said he and his brother Shahyer, who was driving with a revoked license, attempted to pass themselves off as each other. Nauman was charged with false impersonation and conspiracy, both misdemeanors; the disposition of the charges was not known.

In February 2019, Nauman retained Joe Tacopina as defense attorney, who characterized the impasse between the state and the NTSB as an effort to protect a weak case.

=== Indictment and trial ===
On April 5, 2019, the grand jury indicted Nauman Hussain on 20 counts each of criminally negligent homicide and second-degree manslaughter. Hussain was arrested again and then freed a week later on $450,000 bond. Trial was set for September. Since the defense had received access to the limousine and its parts only a week before the filing, Hussain's trial was postponed to January 2020. Two months later, Bartlett again postponed the trial date to early May 2020. Tacopina said that the prosecution had been slowed by new bail reform laws in New York. The COVID-19 pandemic led to a statewide stay-at-home order in mid-March, which delayed the trial further, since Schoharie County suspended all jury trials until normal court operations could resume.

==== Withdrawn plea deal ====
In July 2020 it was reported that a plea bargain was being considered. Mallery, according to lawyers for the victims' families, feared the case may be too complex for a jury to understand; she confirmed her office had been talking to Hussain's attorneys. In September 2021, Hussain pleaded guilty to 20 counts of criminally negligent homicide on the expectation that he would be sentenced to five years of probation and a thousand hours of community service to include public speaking appearances, and would be banned for life from working in the transportation industry. The plea bargain was criticized by victims' families for not including mandatory prison time.

Almost a year later, at the sentencing, state Supreme Court Justice Peter Lynch, who had taken over for the retired Bartlett, insisted that Hussain accept a prison sentence of 1 1/3–4 years, citing removal of the decal from the limousine as evidence that Hussain had willfully broken the law by continuing to operate it commercially, and calling the plea deal "completely disingenuous and unacceptable to this court." In response, Hussain's attorneys formally withdrew his guilty plea. Kindlon expressed surprise and told the media that he and the prosecutors would plan for a trial. Chad Siegel, Hussain's other attorney, said Lynch had taken the removal of the decal "out of context".

Victims' family members who were present expressed surprise and gratitude, faulting Mallery for accepting a deal they saw as too lenient.

Local, state and federal officials praised Lynch's decision. Rep. Elise Stefanik, Republican from Schuylerville, called it "a step forward" and repeated her call for the FBI to be held accountable regarding Shahed's role in the 2009 terrorism plot. Hussain's lawyers filed an appeal, arguing Lynch had exceeded his authority in rejecting the deal, particularly after he had already completed more than half of the thousand hours of community service he expected to be sentenced to.

Hussain filed suit to force the court to accept the plea deal, and lost. In late April 2023, the Appellate Division of the state Supreme Court rejected his appeal and denied permission to appeal to the Court of Appeals, New York's highest court. The trial was held for May.

=== Trial ===
The trial of Nauman Hussain began on Monday, May 8, 2023. Over 200 people went through the jury selection process. The jury that was chosen consisted of 9 women and 3 men and four alternates. The trial began with Judge Peter Lynch removing a juror for unknown reasons. After opening arguments, the prosecution began with the testimony of Lawrence Macera, owner of Royal Limousine and original owner of the limo, and the original buyer of the limousine from the company that conducted the stretch operation, 21st Century Coachworks. Defense attorney Lee Kindlon asked for a mistrial regarding the late disclosing from the DA of the prior arrest and prosecution history of Lawrence Macera after he google-searched his name and revealed that he had pled guilty to stealing from a railroad company. The motion was denied by Judge Peter Lynch, however the testimony was stricken from the record. By the end of the first day, Chad Smith took the stand. Chad Smith was the DOT Inspector that had "spot checked" the crashed limo and twice affixed an "Out of Service" vehicle sticker to it.

At the start of the trial's second day, one juror asked to be removed from the jury due to asthma, and an alternate juror was also removed due to suspected marijuana use.

On May 17, 2023, after two days of jury deliberations, Nauman Hussain was convicted on all 20 counts and remanded to the custody of the Schoharie County Sheriff's department. On May 31, 2023, he was sentenced to the maximum of 5 to 15 years in prison.

In November 2024, his appeal was denied. A six-justice panel of the state's Appellate Division unanimously held that the state had offered sufficient evidence that Hussain "was aware of and consciously disregarded the state of disrepair of the limousine's braking system". It was not required to prove that it was foreseeable that the brakes would fail exactly the way they did, nor were Mavis's fraudulently claimed repairs sufficiently exculpatory since the evidence at trial established that even if they had been performed as billed they were not necessary and would not have addressed the real issue with the brakes (Mavis had also advised Hussain that the repairs would not be enough for the limousine to pass inspection). The panel did agree that Hussain had been denied effective assistance of counsel when the trial court gave him only 15 minutes to consider whether he wanted to withdraw his guilty plea after rejecting the plea bargain. "This haste was improvident" the panel wrote. "We cannot condone the impatience demonstrated by Supreme Court when, surely, a longer period of adjournment was appropriate in light of the circumstances." But that was harmless error.

As of January 2025, Hussain was incarcerated at the Attica Correctional Facility in Attica, New York.

=== Questions about Shahed Hussain relationship with FBI ===
At an April 2022 hearing of the House Intelligence Committee, Stefanik, whose redrawn 21st district includes Amsterdam and the crash site, questioned FBI director Christopher A. Wray about whether Shahed Hussain's history as an informant in the terrorism case may have led the bureau to protect him from consequences for the limousine's safety violations. She asked generally whether the FBI works to protect informants from criminal charges unrelated to their work as an informant, and specifically whether it was aware of the safety violations Prestige had incurred prior to the crash. Wray did not answer specifically and said that his staff would get back to her but Stefanik insisted he answer her personally. She gave him a list of questions with an April 12 deadline and told him she would seek a subpoena if she was not satisfied with the response.

Tonko's office said the FBI gave a general briefing about the matter but nothing more. In August Stefanik told Fox News that she had not received any response from the bureau.

== Aftermath ==
Governor Cuomo released a statement which expressed his heartbreak for the victims, commended first responders for helping through the night, and noted the state police were working with federal and local authorities to investigate the crash.

On October 8, Prestige refunded the $1,475 Axel Steenburg had paid for the limo to his credit card. Hussain was arrested the same day. The Steenburg family had not asked for the money back.

The Apple Barrel Country Store collected donations for local first responders and planned a vigil to honor the victims at the store on October 9. The store owners said they would establish a non-profit organization to build a permanent memorial at the crash site next to the store, hoping to complete it by the first anniversary of the crash. In June 2019, the Reflections Memorial Foundation, the non-profit set up by the Apple Barrel, unveiled its design for a permanent memorial at the site based on an idea suggested by Janet Steenburg, mother of two of the victims; the store would donate the land. It would consist primarily of 20 concrete stepping stones; each one would have a print of one victim's shoes. Around the base of the memorial would be the words "You left your footprints on this Earth as a reminder you were here, we know you walk together and are forever near" carved in stone. The 20 wooden crosses placed at the site as a temporary memorial were donated to the state museum in September 2019.

Thousands attended an Amsterdam candlelight vigil for the victims along the banks of the Mohawk River on the evening of October 8. Since three of the dead had been state employees, Cuomo ordered all state government agencies to fly the flags outside their buildings at half-staff on October 11. Funeral services for eight victims—the four sisters, their three husbands and one husband's brother—were held at St. Stanislaus Roman Catholic Church in the city a week after the crash. Hundreds attended, including state and federal officials.

On October 28, Healing Schoharie, a non-profit founded to help the victims' families and first responders to the crash, held a benefit concert at Mohawk Harbor in Schenectady, raising $43,000. To reach the organization's $50,000 goal, Healing Schoharie reached out to Bruce Springsteen via the Backstreets fanzine. In May 2019 the singer autographed a poster from the concert to be auctioned on eBay; the $1,525 winning bid, helped Healing Schoharie reach that target by the end of that month. The money was earmarked for a dinner in honor of the first responders, then for building a permanent memorial at the site.

In June 2019 the town of Guilderland held a softball tournament in memory of a victim who had grown up there; all proceeds were donated to the Amsterdam Youth Sports Association and a memorial bench with his name on it was unveiled. The street in front of Wilbur H. Lynch Literacy Academy, one of the Amsterdam school district's two middle schools, has been named Abby Jackson Way after another victim.

According to the Limousine, Bus and Taxi Operators of Upstate New York, new state regulations and negative public perceptions stemming from the crash caused 60 percent of the state's stretch limo operators to shut down by April 2022.

=== Civil litigation ===
In late November, the parents of Amanda Rivenburg, one of the limousine passengers, filed the first civil lawsuit related to the crash. Their action, brought in Supreme Court for Albany County, named Shahed and Nauman Hussain as defendants, making many of the same allegations of negligence that state investigators had already publicized. Their suit did not specify any amount of monetary damages they were seeking, as their attorney, Sal Ferlazzo, indicated they were just trying to find out what had happened. He also said they would be suing governmental entities such as state agencies in a separate action in the state's Court of Claims.

If they did, those lawsuits might have less chance of succeeding, due to the outcome of similar actions against the state brought by the families of victims of the 2005 Ethan Allen accident, where a small tour boat on Lake George capsized in the wake of a bigger one, killing 20. The NTSB had later faulted state regulators for not reducing the boat's passenger capacity; however the state's highest court, the Court of Appeals, had dismissed the suit, holding that the facts of the case did not create an exception to the state's sovereign immunity, a legal doctrine under which governments it applies to can be sued only if they allow themselves to be. A lawyer who had represented some of those victims, and had been retained by two of the families of limousine crash victims told the Times Union that the state's more direct role in regulating Prestige might result in a different verdict.

In March 2019, attorneys for the Hussains filed their answer to the Rivenburgs' lawsuit. They asserted a range of affirmative defenses, such as that the plaintiffs contributed to their own deaths by failing to wear the seatbelts in the limousine, and that the crash as a whole was an act of God for which their clients could not be held liable. An attorney for the Rivenburgs characterized the defense as "boilerplate", suggesting that the Hussains' attorneys chose to raise an array of standard defenses without settling on one or two that might be best suited to the case.

Two months later, Global Liberty Insurance, which had covered the Excursion at the time of the crash, filed court papers saying its liability for the crash was capped at $500,000. Divided among all 20 victims, that meant some families would receive, at most, $25,000—and that was before legal fees the company's lawyer sought to have deducted. Ferlazzo called the insurer's motions "outrageous and an insult to the victims". A personal-injury lawyer consulted by the Times-Union agreed that "these families are getting screwed" and that as things stood they were not likely to see any more money from Global Liberty. However, it was possible that they could recover additional money from the victims' own insurance companies, if the victims had cars of their own, since New York requires all motorists to have supplemental uninsured motorist coverage as part of their mandated auto insurance policies, and Lisinicchia was not listed as a driver on Prestige's policy for the limousine.

At the end of August, family members of Erin and Shane McGowan, another of the married couples killed in the crash, sued Mavis Discount Tire, alleging poor repair work on the limousine and the alleged illegal inspection by the chain's Saratoga store contributed to the McGowans' deaths; "They played a role here", said their lawyer. "We're going to hold them accountable." Prestige, too, was named as a defendant. In 2020 the Rivenburgs joined other plaintiffs in adding Mavis as a defendant.

Mavis said it sympathized with the crash victims, but that the company "bears no legal responsibility for this tragedy and the events that led up to it, and we will defend ourselves vigorously against all claims." It was possible that the plaintiffs could recover more from Mavis than they could from Prestige due to the latter's liability cap. The McGowans were joined in suing both defendants by the mother of Matthew Coons (killed along with his girlfriend, Savannah Bursese), in October, the day after the first anniversary of the crash, in Fulton County Court. Her lawyer and Ferlazzo have both indicated that after the criminal trial, when more evidence is available, they planned to add the state DOT as a defendant.

The McGowans' attorneys would not wait that long for the state's evidence. In December they sued the DOT and DMV in Supreme Court for Albany County in the name of the two victims' estates after those agencies denied their requests for records under the state's Freedom of Information Law (FOIL) pertaining to the inspections of the limousine, citing the ongoing investigations, just as they had in response to requests from media organizations. The estate argued that neither agency cited a specific statute or precedent that applied to that. Some of the information they sought has since been made available in prosecution filings in the criminal case, but the McGowans' lawyers maintained that it should have been disclosed under FOIL in response to their request over the summer. In May 2020 an Albany County state Supreme Court justice agreed with their argument on appeal that the investigations were insufficient justification for withholding the records, and ordered them released within 20 days. Late the following month, the state announced it would appeal that decision.

In mid-September Jaclyn Schnurr, the wife and daughter of Brian Hough and James Schnurr respectively, the two pedestrian victims, filed suit in Supreme Court for Cayuga County. In addition to Hussain and Mavis as defendants, she named the Apple Barrel Country Store, whose parking lot she had been in with her husband and father when the Excursion struck them just feet away from her, claiming that the store should have put up barriers to prevent crashes into its parking lot since it knew that the intersection was dangerous. The crash was not the first time vehicles that could not or did not stop at the bottom of the hill had gone into the store's parking lot. The store's owners could not be reached for comment.

The family of another victim, Amanda Halse, filed their lawsuit a month later. Like the other plaintiffs, they named Mavis and the Hussains as defendants. The Halses have additionally named Pakistani business magnate Malik Riaz Hussain, Shahed's brother, since he allegedly financed the Hussains' acquisition of the Wilton motel where Prestige is based; his name is on the deeds to the Wilton motel Shahed and Nauman operate. In March 2022 he was dismissed as a defendant; his attorneys argued he had no interest in Prestige.

Shortly before Christmas, seven more victims' families filed two separate suits. The first names the state as defendant, alleging it was negligent both in ensuring the intersection and Prestige were safe. The second, filed in Supreme Court for Montgomery County, names Prestige, the Hussains and Mavis as defendants, with the same allegations as those made by other plaintiffs.

A June 2020 suit filed by the family of victim Michael Ukaj, in Saratoga County, goes into greater detail in alleging Mavis's liability. Prestige's drivers, including Lisinicchia, refused when possible to drive the Excursion as they were aware of its inadequate braking capability, the Ukaj family claims. Employees at Mavis, the Ukajes' complaint says, were aware that repair work the shop had done to the limousine's brakes was insufficient and that problems remained. Two years before the crash, the suit alleged, a Mavis mechanic put a Vise-Grip on the bent left rear brake line following a rotor replacement, leaving the vehicle reliant almost entirely on its front brakes, and in May 2018 the store put a valid inspection sticker on the Excursion without performing the inspection. Mavis denied responsibility and said it will ask to be removed as a defendant from all suits filed against it over the crash. In 2023, Mavis would settle many of the victims lawsuits, for confidential amounts in the range of 2 million dollars per victim. By 2026, Mavis had settled with 19 of the 20 victims, including the limousine driver.

At the end of August 2020, lawyers hired by Hussain's insurance company filed their response to the Steenburg family's action. They claimed that the plaintiffs should have been aware of the risks of limousine travel, and by embarking on the journey they "willingly and voluntarily assumed" them. Ferlazzo, not representing the Steenburgs, called the defense "dubious", since people hire those vehicles and their drivers on the assumption that they are safe. The defense also claimed the passengers' failure to wear seatbelts contributed to their deaths; the NTSB's preliminary report said those seatbelts had not been installed properly and were unreachable.

Just prior to the crash's second anniversary, Lisnicchia's family sued the Hussains and Mavis, citing the vehicle's poorly maintained brakes as the cause of the driver's death.

Global Liberty was placed into liquidation a week after the third anniversary. Discovery in all lawsuits involving the crash was halted after a Suffolk County court ordered a six-month stay in all legal actions involving Global Liberty. When that stay expired in March 2022, depositions were scheduled for the period between July and October.

In July, at the end of that year's legislative session, a bill called the Grieving Families Act was passed, in response to the limitations faced by the plaintiffs in the Schoharie crash suits, as well as some other recent incidents. It would allow plaintiffs in wrongful death cases to seek emotional damages, and expand the category of family members with standing to file such suits. It was strongly opposed by insurance companies and some medical and business groups. The bill was vetoed by Gov. Kathy Hochul, who had replaced Cuomo following his resignation in 2021. Hochul has vetoed the bill a total of four times, most recently in 2025.

== See also ==
- 2009 Taconic State Parkway crash
- 2018 Hong Kong bus accident, also occurred on a downslope with the driver allegedly speeding, killing 19
- List of traffic collisions (2000–present)
