= Sternbergh House =

Historic house in New York, United States

- U.S. National Register of Historic Places
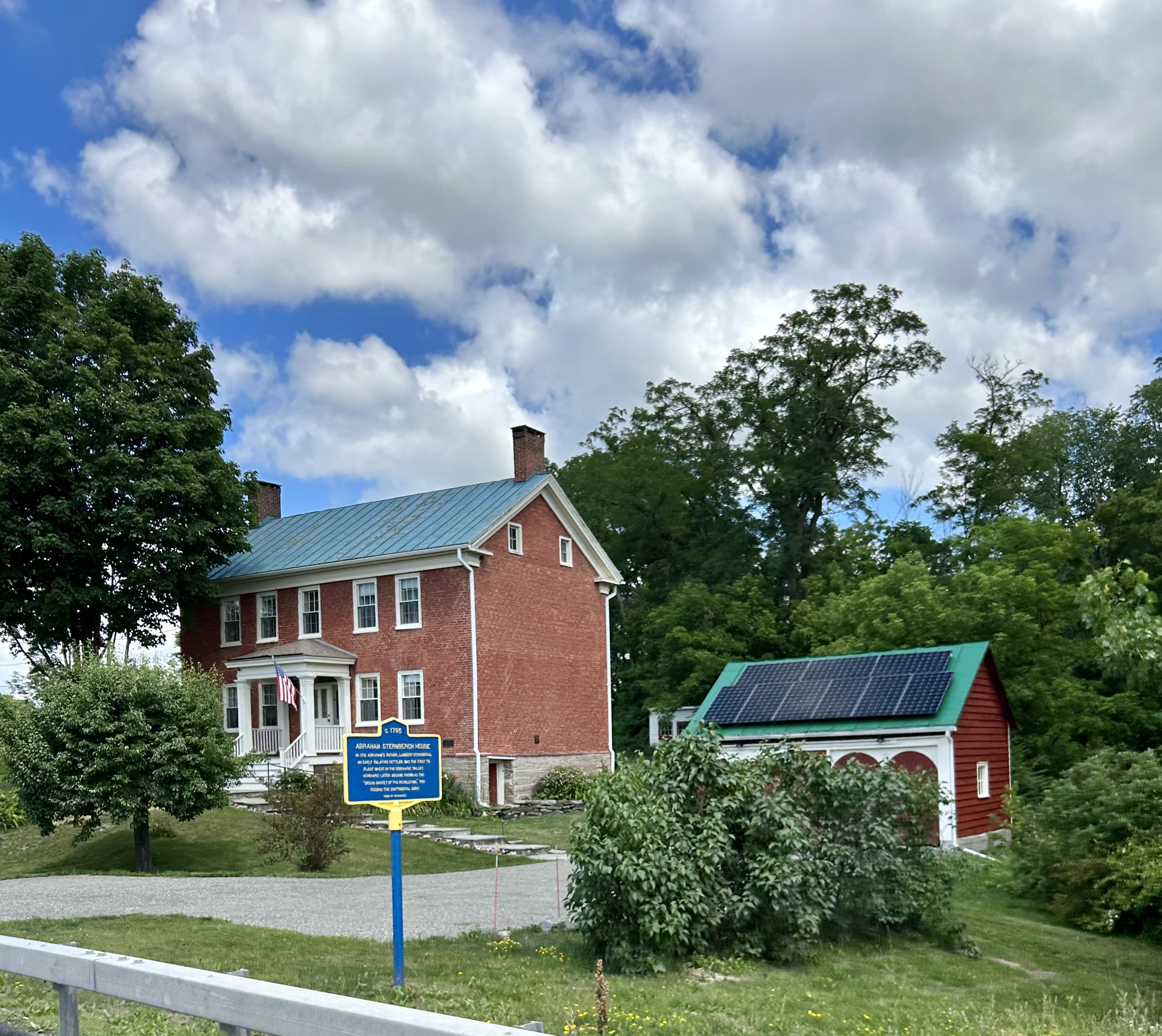
- Abraham Sternbergh House, Schoharie, New York, June 2023

- Location within New York Location within the United States
- Nearest city: Schoharie, New York
- Coordinates: 42°42′6″N 74°18′7″W
- Area: 14.6 acres (5.9 ha)
- Built: 1825
- Architectural style: Federal, Vernacular Federal
- NRHP reference No.: 85000629
- Added to NRHP: March 21, 1985

Sternbergh House is a historic home located at Schoharie in Schoharie County, New York. It was built about 1825 is a two-story, five-bay, center entrance timber-framed vernacular Federal style house. Also on the property is the 1813 grave of Abraham Sternbergh.

A New York State historical marker posted in front of the house reads:

Abraham Sternbergh House

In 1713 Abraham's father, Lambert Sternbergh, an early Palatine settler, was the first to plant wheat in the Schoharie Valley. Schoharie later became known as the 'Bread Basket of the Revolution' for feeding the Continental Army.

Town of Schoharie"

It was listed on the National Register of Historic Places in 1985.
