= Christian Hess House and Shoemaker's Shop =

Historic house in New York, United States

- U.S. National Register of Historic Places
- Location within New York Location within the United States
- Location: 111 Stony Brook Rd., Schoharie, New York
- Coordinates: 42°38′40″N 74°19′12″W
- Area: 0.82 acres (0.33 ha)
- Built: c. 1783, c. 1805
- Architectural style: New World Dutch
- NRHP reference No.: 15000369
- Added to NRHP: June 30, 2015

Christian Hess House and Shoemaker's Shop, also known as the Christian Hess Homestead and Weaver House, is a historic home and commercial building located at Schoharie, Schoharie County, New York. The house was built about 1783, and is a 1 1/2-story, banked, timber frame dwelling in a traditional New World Dutch style. A wing was added in 1977. Also on the property is a small shoemaker's shop, built about 1805. It is an L-shaped building with a gable roof.

It was listed on the National Register of Historic Places in 2015.
