= Becker–Westfall House =

Historic house in New York, United States

- U.S. National Register of Historic Places
- Location within New York Location within the United States
- Nearest city: Schoharie, New York
- Coordinates: 42°40′33″N 74°15′13″W
- Area: 4 acres (1.6 ha)
- Built: 1784
- NRHP reference No.: 79001631
- Added to NRHP: November 20, 1979

Becker–Westfall House, also known as Westfall House, is a historic home and tavern located at Schoharie in Schoharie County, New York, United States. It is a brick structure built in 1784, with a two-story, three-bay rectangular block and a one-story, three-bay wing. Also on the property is a brick smoke house, garage, barn, and a cow stable.

The house was added to the National Register of Historic Places in 1979.
