= Schoharie Valley Railroad Complex =

- U.S. National Register of Historic Places
- U.S. Historic district
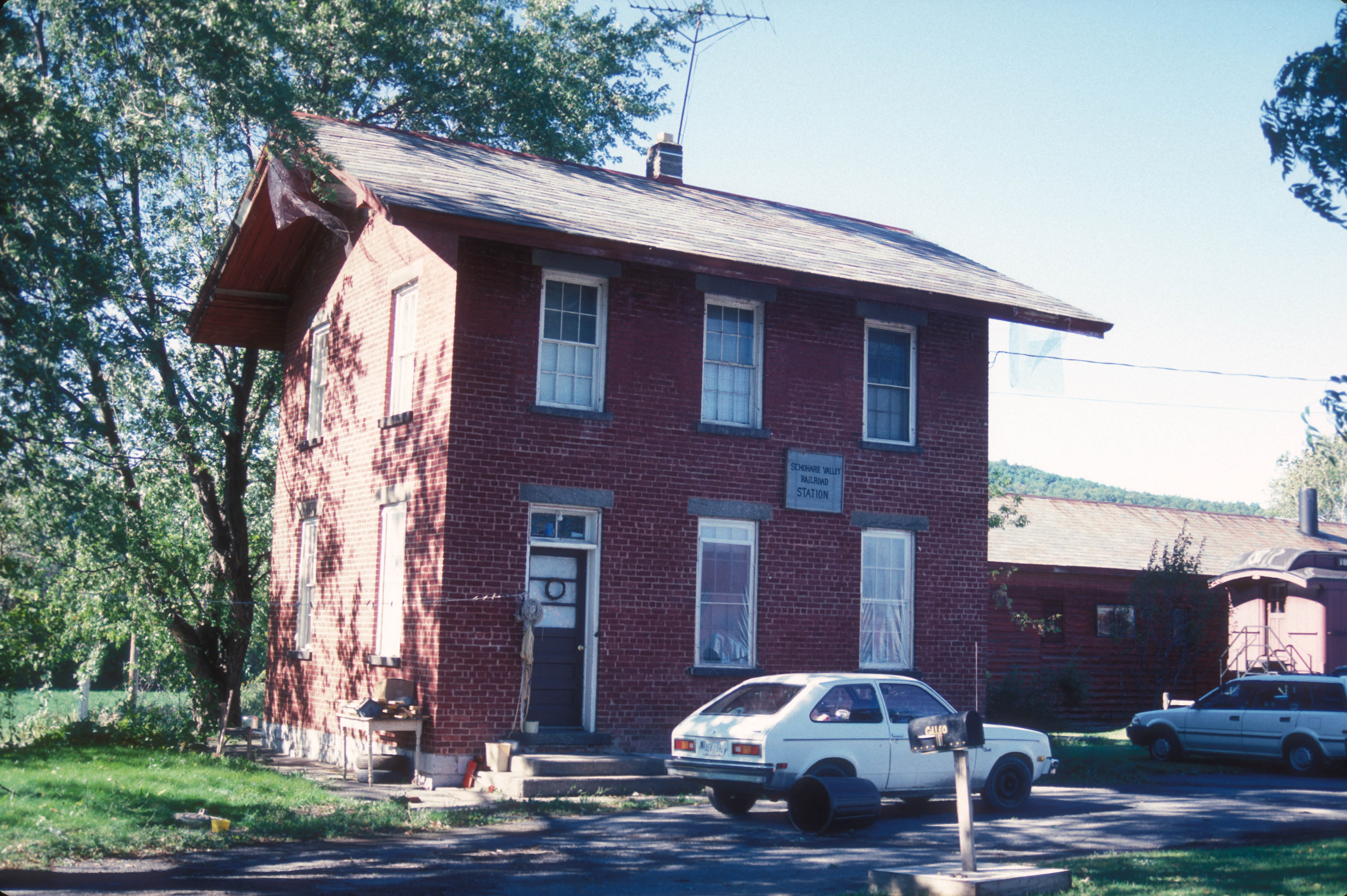

- Location within New York Location within the United States
- Location: Depot Lane, Schoharie, New York
- Coordinates: 42°40′13″N 74°18′39″W
- Area: 0 acres (0 ha)
- Built: 1867
- NRHP reference No.: 72000914
- Added to NRHP: April 26, 1972

Schoharie Valley Railroad Complex is a national historic district located at Schoharie in Schoharie County, New York. The district includes five contributing buildings and four contributing structures. The complex of buildings were built about 1875 by the Schoharie Valley Railroad. They include the passenger station, freight / locomotive house, office, old mill building, storage facility, and four coal silos. The four mile railroad was abandoned in 1942.

It was listed on the National Register of Historic Places in 1972.
