= Lasell Hall =

Historic house in New York, United States

- U.S. National Register of Historic Places
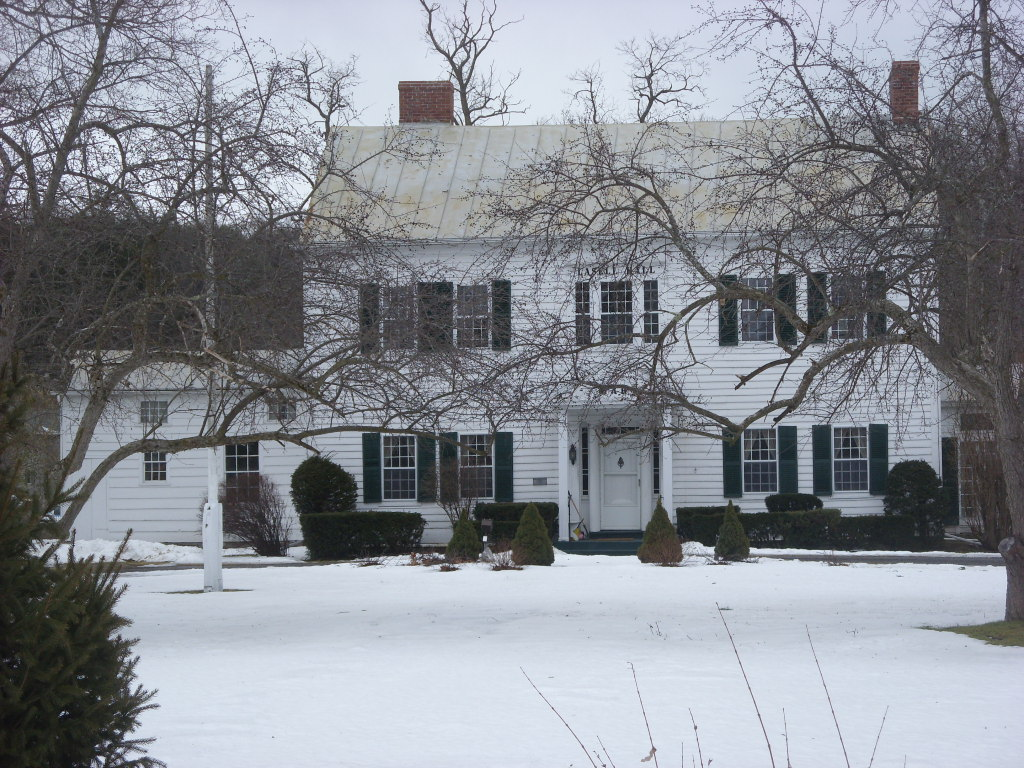
- Lasell Hall, February 2009

- Location within New York Location within the United States
- Location: 350 Main St., Schoharie, New York
- Coordinates: 42°39′45″N 74°18′45″W
- Area: 7.7 acres (3.1 ha)
- Built: 1795
- Architectural style: Federal
- NRHP reference No.: 01001444
- Added to NRHP: January 11, 2002

Lasell Hall, also known as D. A. R. Hall, is a historic home located at Schoharie in Schoharie County, New York which was listed on the National Register of Historic Places in 2002. It was built around 1795 is a 2 1/2-story, five-bay timber framed Federal-style house, with several wings in the back. It was designed to be both a tavern and a residence. Since 1913, it has been owned and maintained by the Schoharie Chapter of the Daughters of the American Revolution.
