= Colyer House =

Historic house in New York, United States

- The Colyer House
- U.S. National Register of Historic Places
- Location within New York Location within the United States
- Location: 5729 NY 30, Schoharie, New York
- Coordinates: 42°41′43″N 74°17′51″W
- Area: 4.4 acres (1.8 ha)
- Built: 1795
- Architectural style: Federal
- NRHP reference No.: 08000025
- Added to NRHP: February 13, 2008

The Colyer House is a historic home located in the town of Schoharie in Schoharie County, New York, United States. It was built about 1785 and is a two-story, five-bay brick Federal-style house, with a 1 1/2-story kitchen wing. Minor alterations were made during the Greek Revival period. It features a slate gable roof.

It was listed on the National Register of Historic Places in 2008.
