= Abraham Sternberg House =

Historic house in New York, United States

- U.S. National Register of Historic Places
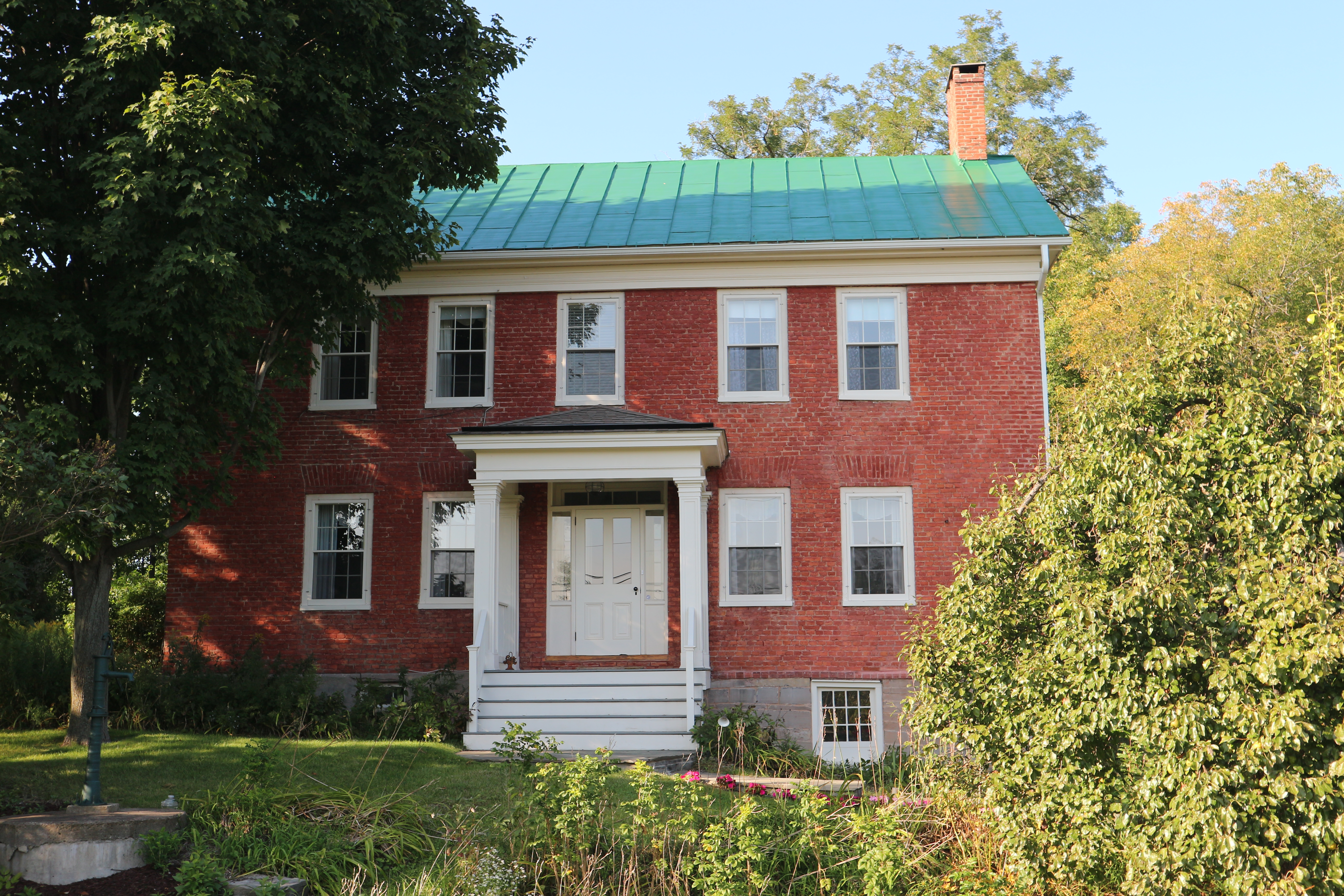

- Location within New York Location within the United States
- Location: 150 New York State Route 30A, Schoharie, New York
- Coordinates: 42°42′6″N 74°18′15″W
- Area: 22.9 acres (9.3 ha)
- Built: c. 1790
- NRHP reference No.: 10000726
- Added to NRHP: September 8, 2010

Abraham Sternberg House is a historic home located at Schoharie in Schoharie County, New York. The house was built about 1790 and is a symmetrically massed, two story masonry building, five bays wide and two bays deep. The brick building is set on a limestone foundation and has a side gable roof. Also on the property is a shed ell (mid- late-19th century) that abuts the house, chicken coop (c. 1935), and former barn (mid- late-19th century).

It was listed on the National Register of Historic Places in 2010.

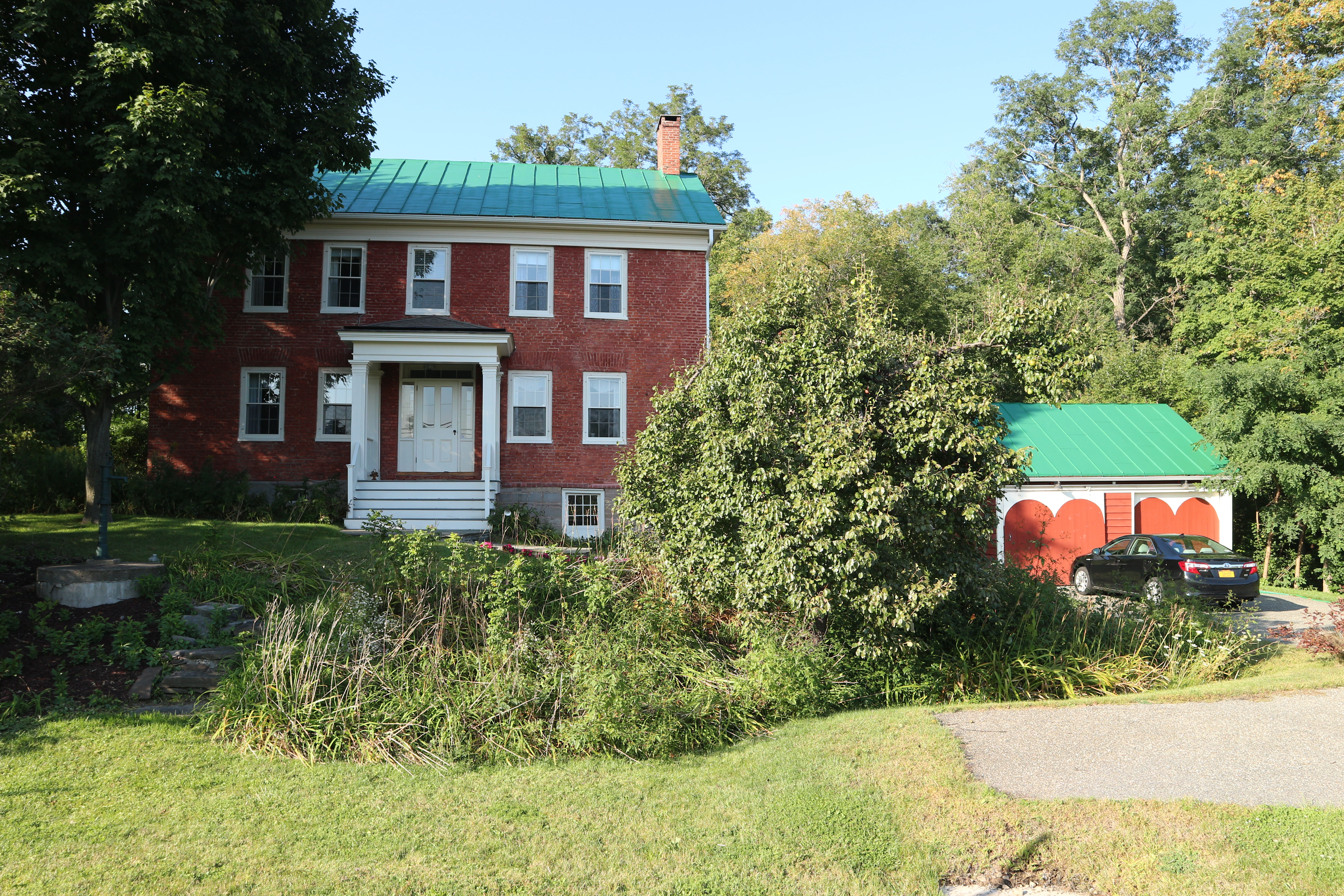
