= Daniel Webster Jenkins House =

United States historic place

- U.S. National Register of Historic Places
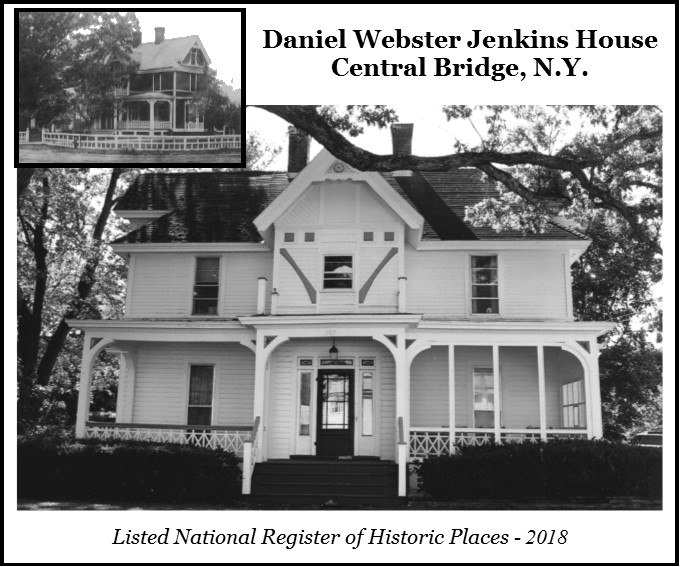

- Location within New York Location within the United States
- Location: 207 Church Street, Central Bridge, New York
- Coordinates: 42°42′38″N 74°20′19″W
- Area: 1.83 acres (0.74 ha)
- Built: 1884
- Architectural style: Federal
- NRHP reference No.: 100002387
- Added to NRHP: May 4, 2018

Daniel Webster Jenkins House is a historic house in the hamlet of Central Bridge, Schoharie County, New York. It was listed on the National Register of Historic Places in May 2018.

== History ==
The house was constructed in 1884 as a two-story residence in the Queen Anne style. It includes a carriage barn built in the late 19th century. The carriage barn is a contributing structure to the house's National Register of Historic Places (NRHP) listing.

On March 16, 2018, Governor of New York Andrew Cuomo nominated the house for inclusion on the New York State Register of Historic Places and the NRHP. The house was added to the Federal Register on April 12, 2018, and was listed on the NRHP on May 4, 2018.
