= Schoharie (village), New York =

Schoharie, New York
- Village
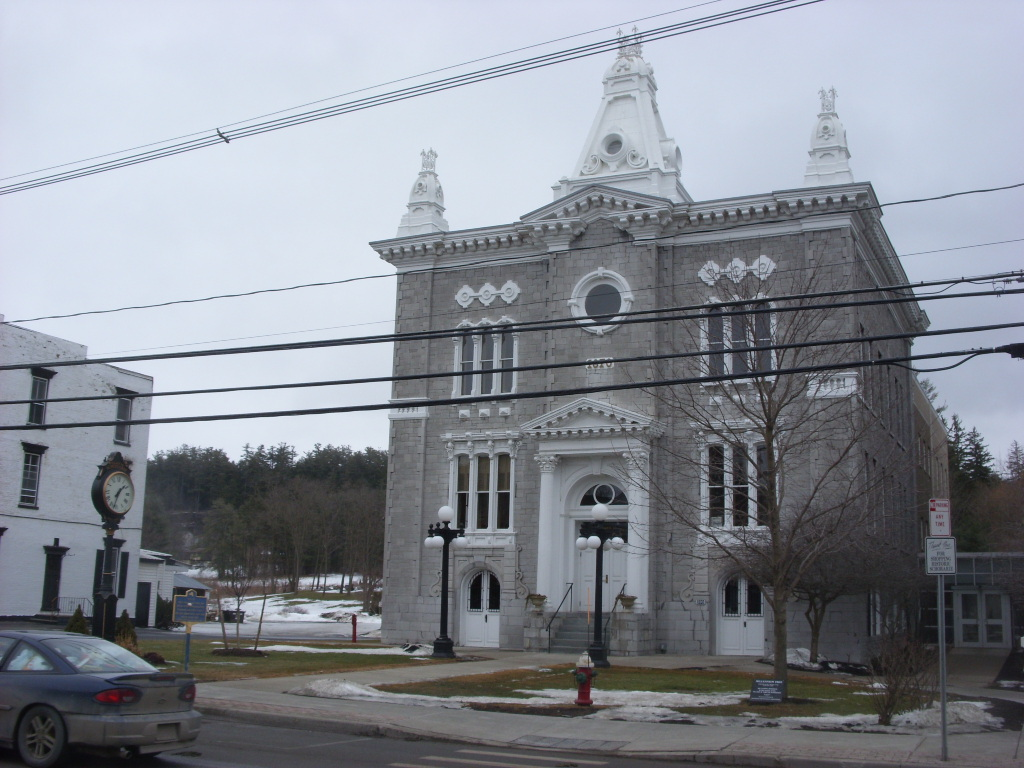
- Schoharie County Courthouse

- Location within the state of New York
- Coordinates: 42°40′1″N 74°18′35″W
- Country: United States
- State: New York
- County: Schoharie

Area
  - Total: 1.66 sq mi (4.30 km^{2})
  - Land: 1.66 sq mi (4.30 km^{2})
  - Water: 0 sq mi (0.00 km^{2})
- Elevation: 600 ft (183 m)

Population (2020)
  - Total: 916
  - Density: 552.3/sq mi (213.26/km^{2})
- Time zone: UTC-5 (Eastern (EST))
  - Summer (DST): UTC-4 (EDT)
- ZIP code: 12157
- Area code: 518
- FIPS code: 36-65585
- GNIS feature ID: 0964598
- Website: Official website

Schoharie (/skoʊˈhɛəriː/ skoh-HAIR-ee) is a village and the county seat of Schoharie County, New York, United States. The population was 916 at the 2020 census. The name is a native word for driftwood.

The Village of Schoharie is in the southeast part of the Town of Schoharie and is west of Albany.

== History ==
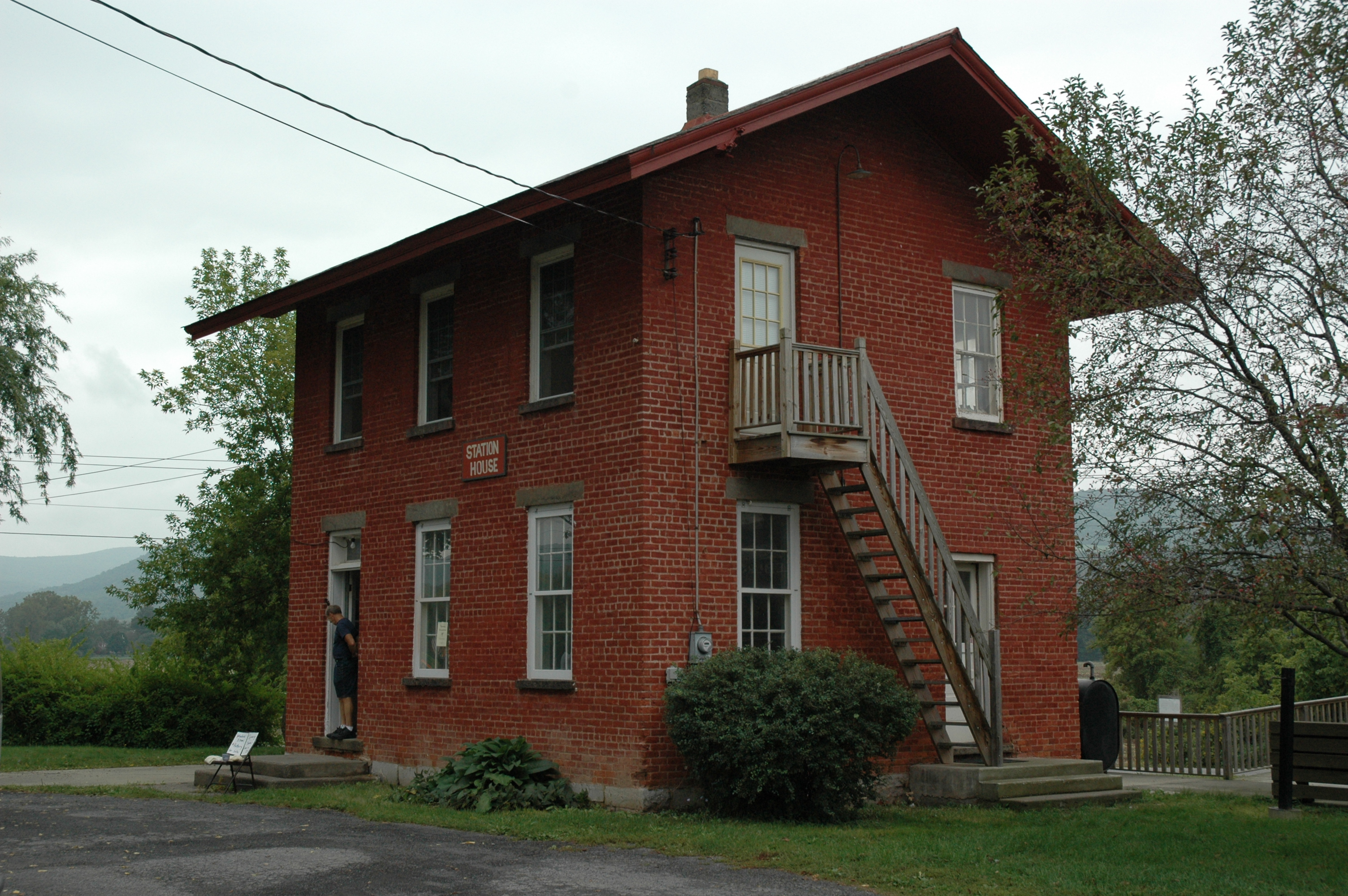
Station of the Middleburgh and Schoharie Railroad in Schoharie

The village was first settled around 1718 by Palatine Germans.

The village was originally called "Brunnendorf," "Fountain Village," and "Sommersville." The first two names stem from a spring at the site of the early community.

The historic Middleburgh-Schoharie Railroad was half-based in the village.

Due to Hurricane Irene in August 2011 the Village experienced a flood which inundated large portions of the Village with up to 7 feet of water.

The Lasell Hall, Old Lutheran Parsonage, Old Stone Fort, St. Paul's Lutheran Church Historic District, Schoharie County Courthouse Complex, and Schoharie Valley Railroad Complex are listed on the National Register of Historic Places.

== Geography ==
Schoharie is located at 42°40′1″N 74°18′34″W (42.667032, -74.30961).

According to the United States Census Bureau, the village has a total area of 1.6 square miles (4.1 km^{2}). None of the area is covered with water.

Schoharie is on Route 30 (Main Street) at the junction of County Roads 1A (Bridge Street) and 1B (Prospect Street).

The village is east of the Schoharie Creek.

== Demographics ==
Historical population
Census	Pop.	Note	%±
1870	1,200		—
1880	1,188		−1.0%
1890	1,028		−13.5%
1900	1,006		−2.1%
1910	996		−1.0%
1920	851		−14.6%
1930	827		−2.8%
1940	941		13.8%
1950	1,059		12.5%
1960	1,168		10.3%
1970	1,125		−3.7%
1980	1,016		−9.7%
1990	1,045		2.9%
2000	1,030		−1.4%
2010	922		−10.5%
2020	916		−0.7%
U.S. Decennial Census

As of the census of 2000, there were 1,030 people, 448 households, and 254 families residing in the village. The population density was 623.8 inhabitants per square mile (240.9/km^{2}). There were 478 housing units at an average density of 289.5 units per square mile (111.8 units/km^{2}). The racial makeup of the village was 97.86% White, 0.68% Black or African American, 0.49% Native American, 0.19% Asian, 0.29% from other races, and 0.49% from two or more races. Hispanic or Latino of any race were 1.65% of the population.

There were 448 households, out of which 26.3% had children under the age of 18 living with them, 43.3% were married couples living together, 11.6% had a female householder with no husband present, and 43.3% were non-families. 37.7% of all households were made up of individuals, and 23.0% had someone living alone who was 65 years of age or older. The average household size was 2.18 and the average family size was 2.89.

In the village, the population was spread out, with 20.8% under the age of 18, 8.1% from 18 to 24, 23.9% from 25 to 44, 25.5% from 45 to 64, and 21.7% who were 65 years of age or older. The median age was 43 years. For every 100 females, there were 89.7 males. For every 100 females age 18 and over, there were 84.6 males.

The median income for a household in the village was $33,203, and the median income for a family was $50,750. Males had a median income of $34,000 versus $27,031 for females. The per capita income for the village was $20,806. About 5.9% of families and 10.7% of the population were below the poverty line, including 4.9% of those under age 18 and 17.3% of those age 65 or over.

== Notable people ==
- Author Chris Hedges grew up in Schoharie.
- NYS Assemblyman Pete Lopez lives in Schoharie and served as Town Supervisor.
