= St. Paul's Lutheran Church Historic District =

Historic church in New York, United States

- U.S. National Register of Historic Places
- U.S. Historic district
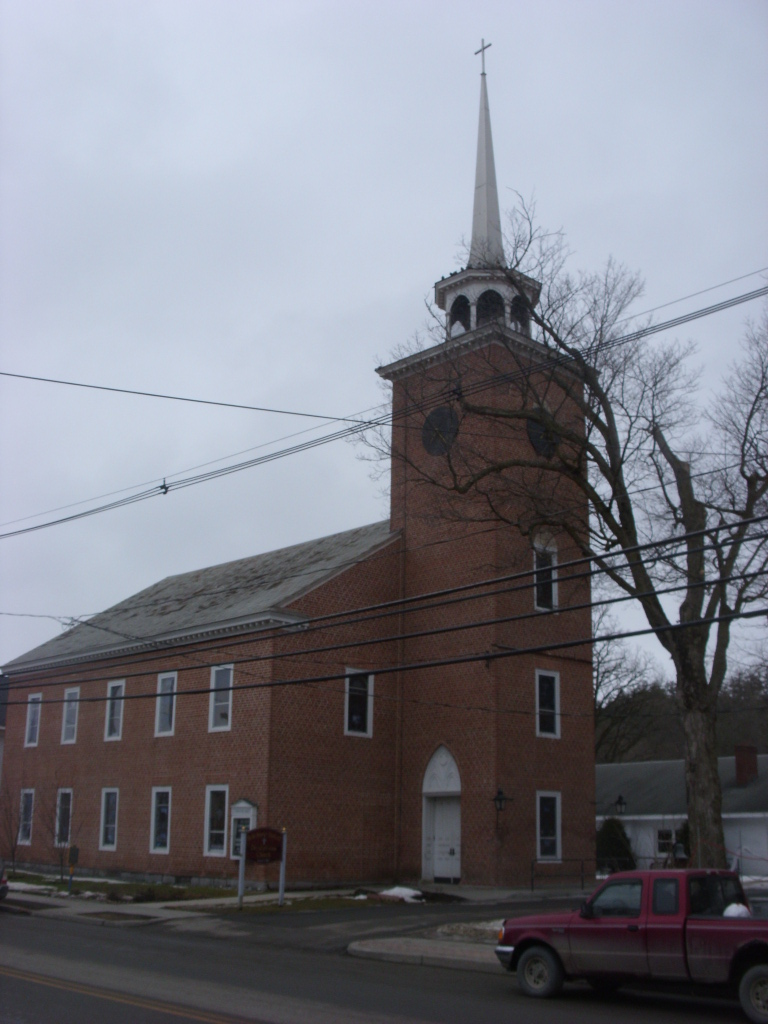
- St. Paul's Lutheran Church, February 2009

- Location within New York Location within the United States
- Location: 312-314 Main St. & Cemetery Ln., Schoharie, New York
- Coordinates: 42°39′52″N 74°18′45″W
- Area: 16.41 acres (6.64 ha)
- Built: 1743, 1795-1796, 1801, 1836, 1896, 1959
- Architect: Lines Porter
- Architectural style: Federal, Colonial
- NRHP reference No.: 14000584
- Added to NRHP: September 10, 2014

St. Paul's Lutheran Church Historic District, also known as Schoharie United Presbyterian Church, is a historic Lutheran church complex and national historic district located at Schoharie, Schoharie County, New York. The complex consists of the former St. Paul's Lutheran Church, an 1801 manse, St. Paul's Lutheran Cemetery, and the old Lutheran Parsonage. The church was built in 1796, and is a two-story rectangular brick building. The front facade features a square, multistage entrance tower capped by an octagonal belfry and spire. The new manse was built in 1801, and is a five bay, two-story, double pile, heavy timber frame Federal style dwelling with a two-story rear ell. The church cemetery has several thousand graves, with the earliest marked grave dated to 1778. The Old Lutheran Parsonage was built in 1743, and is separately listed. In 1920, the local Lutheran and Methodist congregations joined, and in 1960, the congregation voted to affiliate with the Presbyterian denomination.

It was listed on the National Register of Historic Places in 2014.
