= Becker Stone House =

Historic house in New York, United States

- U.S. National Register of Historic Places
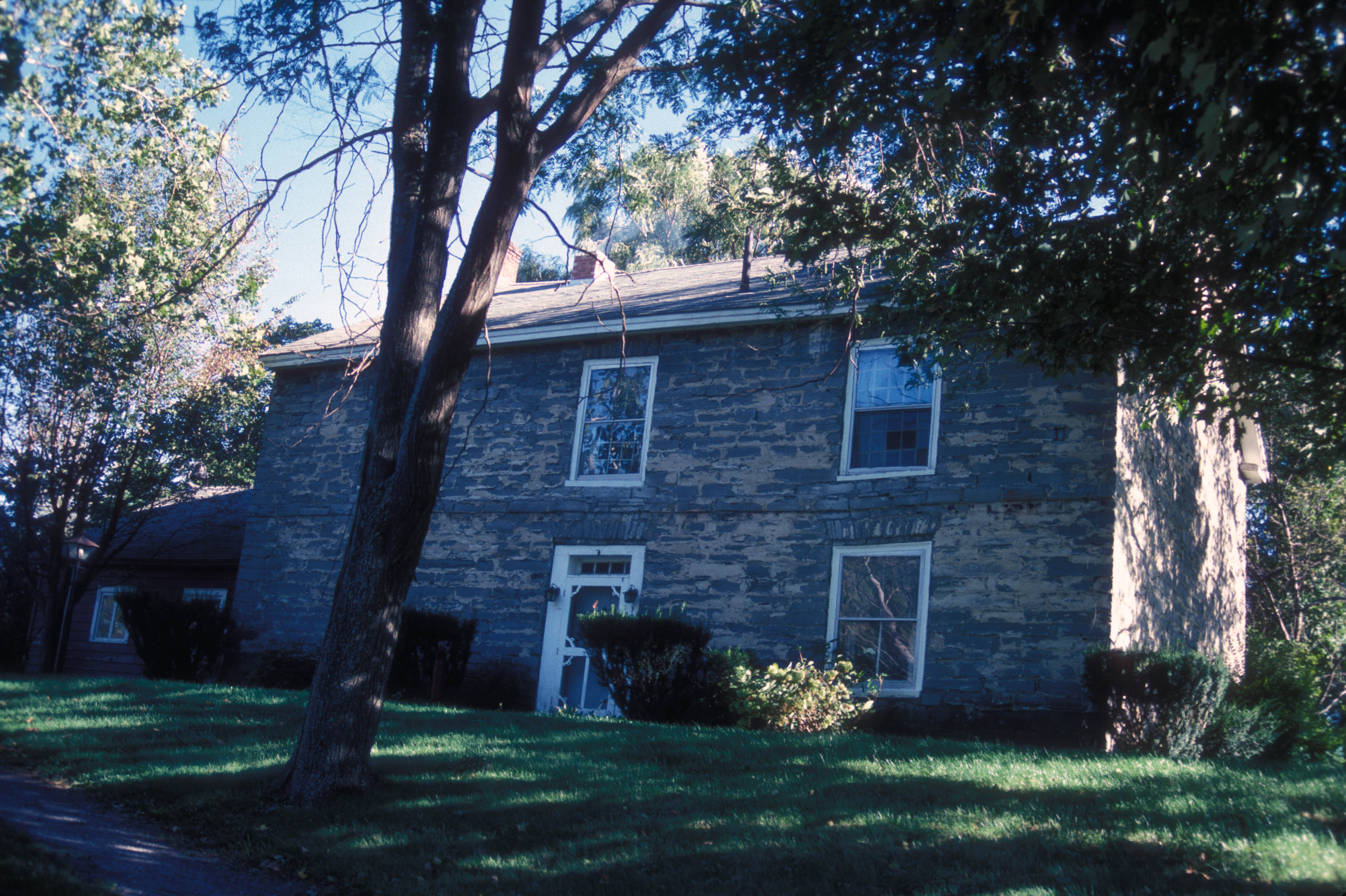

- Location within New York Location within the United States
- Nearest city: Schoharie, New York
- Coordinates: 42°40′22″N 74°15′8″W
- Area: 4 acres (1.6 ha)
- Built: 1775
- NRHP reference No.: 79001630
- Added to NRHP: November 20, 1979

Becker Stone House is a historic home located at Schoharie in Schoharie County, New York. It is a two-story, three-bay rectangular block with walls of locally quarried coursed stone and rubble and a gable roof. When originally built between 1772 and 1775, it is reported to have had a gambrel roof.

It was listed on the National Register of Historic Places in 1979.
