= Old Lutheran Parsonage =

- U.S. National Register of Historic Places
- U.S. Historic district – Contributing property
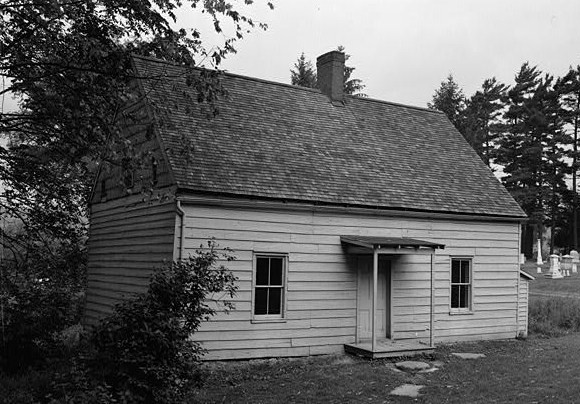

- Location within New York Location within the United States
- Location: Adjacent to Spring St. in Lutheran Cemetery, Schoharie, New York
- Coordinates: 42°39′42″N 74°18′31″W
- Area: less than one acre
- Built: 1743
- NRHP reference No.: 72000913
- Added to NRHP: June 19, 1972

Old Lutheran Parsonage is a historic Lutheran church parsonage adjacent to Spring Street in Lutheran Cemetery in Schoharie, Schoharie County, New York. It was built in 1743 and is a 1 1/2-story building with basement. It is the oldest building in Schoharie County. And it's one of the oldest religious buildings remaining in New York State.

By the year 1742, the German Lutherans in the Schoharie Valley were well enough established, and prosperous enough, to build a church and to put in a call for a Lutheran pastor, ordained in Germany, to minister to the community.

Peter Nicholas Sommer, from Hamburg, Germany, answered the call and arrived in Schoharie in May of 1743. A parsonage was constructed and completed in September 1743. The building would serve as a Church, as well as a parsonage until a church could be built. That building was not completed until 1751.

By then Pastor Sommer had married Maria Keyser. The couple had four children by the time the church was built and by the time the American Revolution began, they were a family of ten.

The building was spared when the British forces burned the valley in 1780. A new parsonage was built in 1797 and the old building went through a variety of uses including rental property, and housing for the church sexton. By 1970 it was abandoned.

After a similar house of the same age was destroyed to build a power plant the Schoharie Colonial Heritage Association was formed to save any buildings from destruction. The Palatine house became available in 1972, and the building was restored and opened as a museum several years later.

SCHA continues to operate the museum today.

It was listed on the National Register of Historic Places in 1972. It is located in the St. Paul's Lutheran Church Historic District.
