= Schoharie County Courthouse Complex =

- U.S. National Register of Historic Places
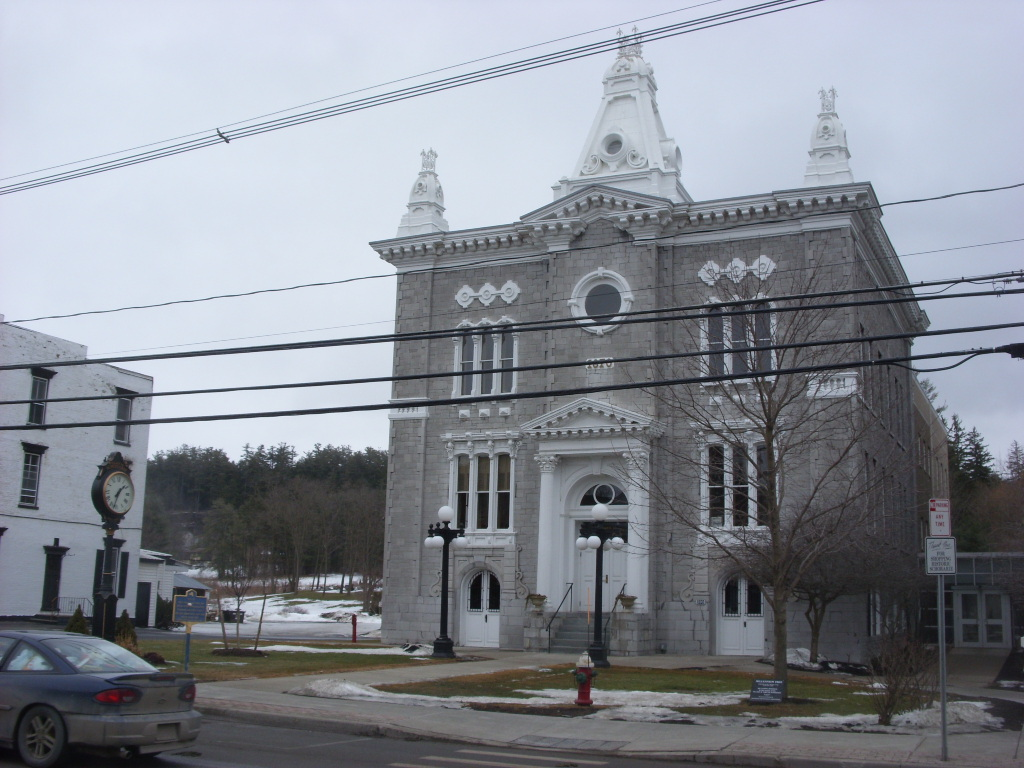
- Schoharie County Courthouse, February 2009

- Location within New York Location within the United States
- Location: Main St., Schoharie, New York
- Coordinates: 42°39′49″N 74°18′44″W
- Area: 1 acre (0.40 ha)
- Built: 1870
- Architect: Cornelius, John
- Architectural style: Italianate
- NRHP reference No.: 95001010
- Added to NRHP: August 15, 1995

Schoharie County Courthouse Complex is a historic courthouse and county clerk's building located at Schoharie in Schoharie County, New York. The courthouse building was built in 1870 and is a two-story structure above a raised basement structure built of cut limestone block laid random ashlar. It features a shallow hipped roof surmounted by an ornate pyramidal cupola and corner turrets of pressed metal. The county clerk's building is a two-story, hip-roofed, rectangular stone building built of random ashlar limestone in 1914.

It was listed on the National Register of Historic Places in 1995.

== Gallery ==
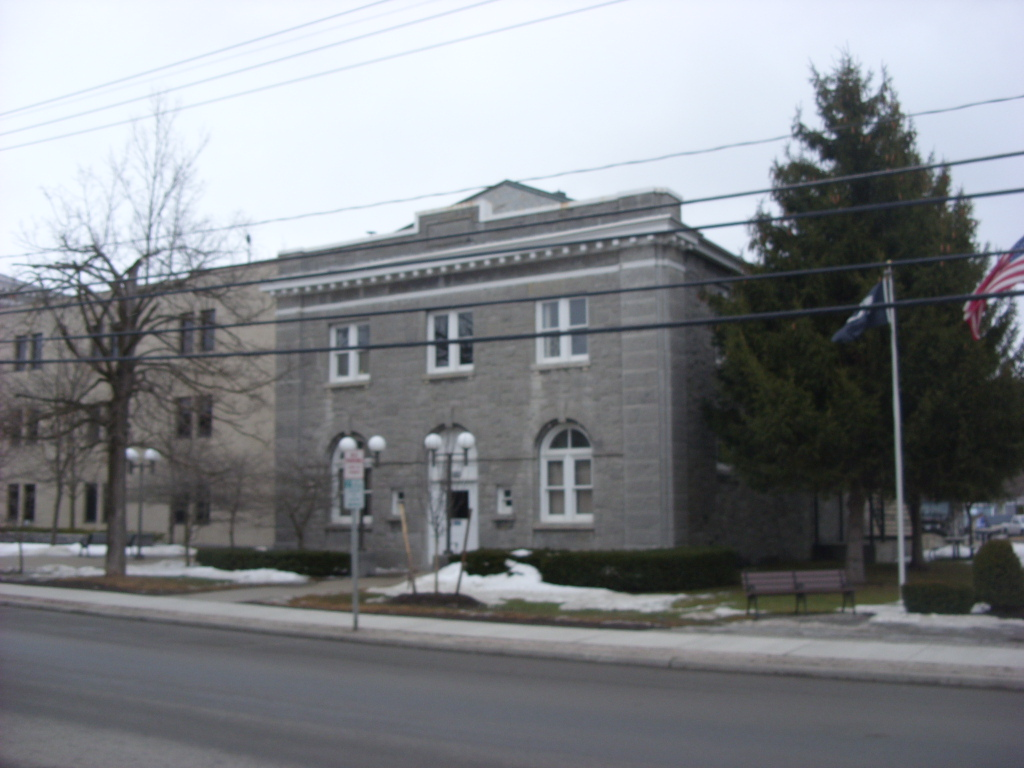
Schoharie County Clerks Office, February 2009
