= Schoharie, New York =

- Town
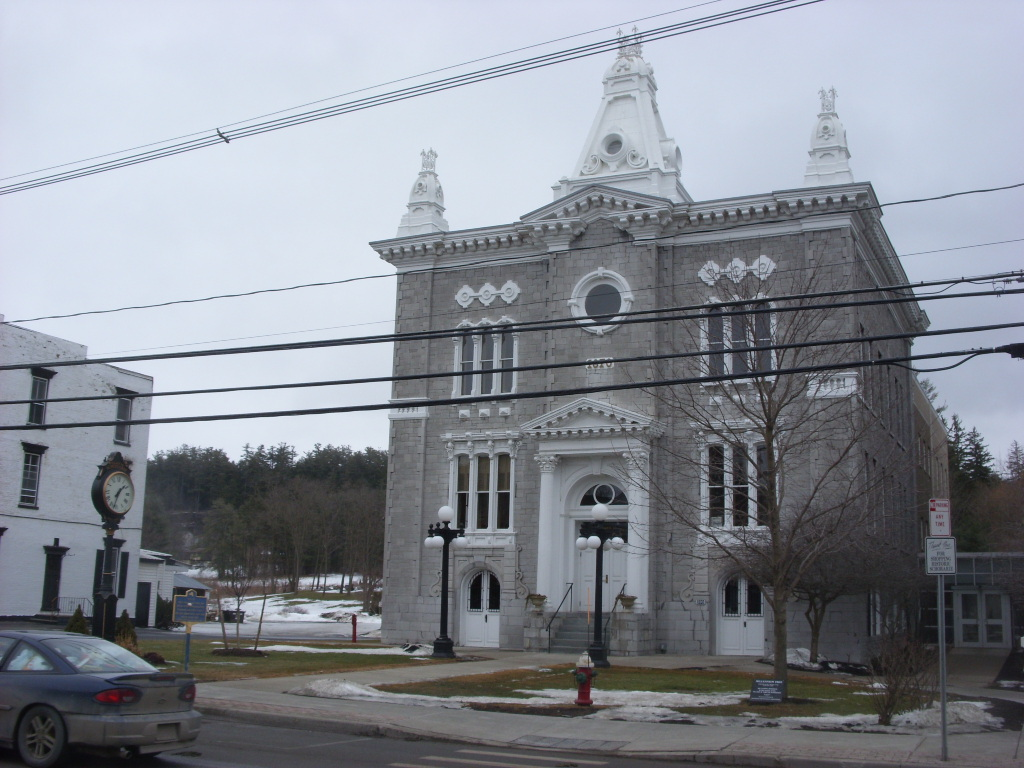
- Schoharie County Courthouse

- Location in Schoharie County and the state of New York.
- Coordinates: 42°40′44″N 74°18′44″W
- Country: United States
- State: New York
- County: Schoharie
- Settled: 1718
- Established: 1788

Government
  - Supervisor: Alan Tavenner

Area
  - Total: 29.96 sq mi (77.60 km^{2})
  - Land: 29.83 sq mi (77.26 km^{2})
  - Water: 0.13 sq mi (0.33 km^{2}) 0.57%
- Elevation: 604 ft (184 m)

Population (2020)
  - Total: 3,107
- Time zone: UTC-5 (Eastern (EST))
  - Summer (DST): UTC-4 (EDT)
- ZIP code: 12157
- Area code: 518
- FIPS code: 36-65596
- GNIS feature ID: 0979470
- Website: Town website

Schoharie (/skoʊˈhɛəriː/ skoh-HAIR-ee) is an incorporated town in and the county seat of Schoharie County, New York, United States. The population was 3,107 at the 2020 census.

The Town of Schoharie has a village, also called Schoharie. Both are derived from the Mohawk word for driftwood. The town is on the northeast border of the county. It is part of the Capital District of New York.

== History ==
This area was long occupied by indigenous peoples; in the historic period, the Mohawk people, one of the Five Nations of the Haudenosaunee, or Iroquois Confederacy, dominated this territory, ranging up to the St. Lawrence River and east to the Hudson.

Although the English claimed New York province after taking control from the Dutch, the first European settlements in this area were by Palatine Germans in 1713, after the area was first explored in 1710/11. These Germans were among nearly 3,000 German Protestant refugees who sailed to New York in 1710, on ships arranged by Queen Anne's government. They were refugees from the religious warfare along the border with France, and also had suffered the loss of crops from an extremely harsh winter in 1709, when the Rhine River froze. The English believed the German settlers could help develop the colony and granted them land to the west of English settlements.

Most of the Palatine Germans worked off their passage for several years in two work camps established along the upper Hudson River on property of Livingston Manor, owned by Robert Livingston. When given land, they cleared and established farms. In 1723, 100 Palatine families from the 1710 immigration were granted land just west of Little Falls in the Mohawk Valley under the Burnetsfield Patent. Palatine Germans founded other settlements in the valley, as noted in names such as German Flatts and Palatine Bridge. These frontier settlements were vulnerable to attack, but served as a defensive line during the French and Indian War and the American Revolution.

Developed for agriculture, the Schoharie Valley was considered a breadbasket of the colony because of the amount of wheat produced even during the American Revolutionary War. Raids led by Joseph Brant and his Iroquois allies destroyed most of the buildings in the town of Schoharie.

Schoharie was first known as a district in Albany County before Schoharie County was organized. Established as a town in Albany County in 1788, it became the founding town of the newly created Schoharie County in 1795. In 1797, part of the town was used to form the towns of Blenheim, Broome, Cobleskill, and Middleburgh. Similarly, area for the towns of Esperance and Wright were removed from Schoharie in 1846 as settlement increased in other areas.

Schoharie has continued since its early settlement as a largely agricultural community. Cheesemaking and the dairy industry were important in the 19th century, when products were sold to New York City. Artisan cheesemaking and related trades have been of increasing importance since the late 20th-century.

On July 10, 1989, an F4 tornado, which was part of the July 1989 Northeastern United States tornado outbreak, tore through four counties and hit Schoharie. Schoharie was hit the worst by this tornado, and probably where most of the 20 injuries occurred. There were no deaths reported from the tornado.

On August 28, 2011, the Town of Schoharie was flooded by Hurricane Irene. Schoharie Creek rose to record levels, resulting in massive destruction of roads, homes, and businesses within the Town. Due to the devastation of what was classified as a 500-year flood, federal agencies such as FEMA and the National Guard were called in to assess damages and provide relief, shelter and assistance to affected residents. Many farms in the area suffered severe economic losses due to animals lost or drowned in flood waters, barns deemed unusable and fall harvest crops ruined.

The Becker Stone House, Becker-Westfall House, The Colyer House, Sternbergh House, and Westheimer Site are listed on the National Register of Historic Places. The Abraham Sternberg House was added in 2010 and Christian Hess House and Shoemaker's Shop in 2015.

On October 6, 2018, a limousine crashed in Schoharie, killing 20 people.

== Geography ==
According to the United States Census Bureau, the town has a total area of 30.0 square miles (77.6 km^{2}), of which 29.8 square miles (77.2 km^{2}) is land and 0.2 square mile (0.4 km^{2}) (0.57%) is water.

Part of the northeast town line forms the border of Schenectady County.

Interstate 88 crosses the north part of the town. New York State Route 30 is a north–south highway. State Route 30A diverges from NY-30 near the north town line. State Route 7 parallels the Interstate across the north part of Schoharie. New York State Route 443 intersects NY-30 at Vromans Corners.

The Schoharie Creek flows northward out of the town to the Mohawk River. The Cobleskill Creek enters Schoharie Creek by Old Central Bridge in the northwest part of the town.

== Demographics ==
Historical population
Census	Pop.	Note	%±
1820	3,820		—
1830	5,146		34.7%
1840	5,534		7.5%
1850	2,588		−53.2%
1860	3,090		19.4%
1870	3,207		3.8%
1880	3,350		4.5%
1890	2,944		−12.1%
1900	2,700		−8.3%
1910	2,526		−6.4%
1920	2,132		−15.6%
1930	2,193		2.9%
1940	2,417		10.2%
1950	2,777		14.9%
1960	3,063		10.3%
1970	3,088		0.8%
1980	3,107		0.6%
1990	3,369		8.4%
2000	3,299		−2.1%
2010	3,205		−2.8%
2020	3,107		−3.1%
U.S. Decennial Census

As of the census of 2000, there were 3,299 people, 1,314 households, and 883 families residing in the town. The population density was 110.7 inhabitants per square mile (42.7/km^{2}). There were 1,435 housing units at an average density of 48.2 per square mile (18.6/km^{2}). The racial makeup of the town was 98.30% White, 0.36% Black or African American, 0.48% Native American, 0.12% Asian, 0.18% from other races, and 0.55% from two or more races. Hispanic or Latino of any race were 0.97% of the population.

There were 1,314 households, out of which 31.8% had children under the age of 18 living with them, 53.0% were married couples living together, 10.2% had a female householder with no husband present, and 32.8% were non-families. 26.6% of all households were made up of individuals, and 13.7% had someone living alone who was 65 years of age or older. The average household size was 2.47 and the average family size was 3.01.

In the town, the population was spread out, with 24.9% under the age of 18, 7.6% from 18 to 24, 25.9% from 25 to 44, 26.6% from 45 to 64, and 14.9% who were 65 years of age or older. The median age was 40 years. For every 100 females, there were 92.2 males. For every 100 females age 18 and over, there were 92.5 males.

The median income for a household in the town was $38,576, and the median income for a family was $50,000. Males had a median income of $31,737 versus $25,603 for females. The per capita income for the town was $19,676. About 3.8% of families and 6.1% of the population were below the poverty line, including 2.5% of those under age 18 and 9.8% of those age 65 or over.

== Communities and other locations in the Town of Schoharie ==
- Barton Hill – A location in the northeast part of Schoharie.
- Central Bridge – A hamlet and census-designated place at the north town line on NY-30A. The George Westinghouse, Jr., Birthplace and Boyhood Home was listed on the National Register of Historic Places on March 20, 1986.
- East Cobleskill – A hamlet at the west town line at County Road 1A and NY-145.
- Howes Cave – A hamlet at the west town line north of Cobleskill Creek on County Road 8.
- Old Central Bridge – A hamlet in the northeast part of the town on NY-7 by Interstate 88.
- Schoharie – The Village of Schoharie is on NY Route 30 adjacent to Schoharie Creek in the southeast part of the town.
- Schoharie Hill – An elevation northwest of Schoharie village, south of the Interstate.
- Sidney Corners – A location in the northwest corner of the town at the junction of NY-7 and County Road 70.
- Terrace Mountain – An elevation northwest of the Village of Schoharie.
- Vroman Corners – A location north of Schoharie village on NY-30 at NY-443. It was named for an early Dutch settler.

== Notable people ==
- Loyalist John Crysler grew up in Schoharie and established in Ontario Canada.
- George Westinghouse was born at Central Bridge in 1846. He became an inventor, developing the railway air brake. He also funded development of alternating current power and promoted its use over the rival direct current power system.
- Author Chris Hedges grew up in Schoharie, where his father was the pastor of a Presbyterian church. He writes about the town in Losing Moses on the Freeway: The 10 Commandments in America (2005).
- Pete Lopez, a politician and New York Assemblyman, is a long-time resident of Schoharie. He was elected as the Supervisor of the Town of Schoharie and served for years before becoming County Clerk.
