= Middleburgh, New York (disambiguation) =

Middleburgh is the name of some settlements in New York, United States:

- Middleburgh (town), New York, in Schoharie County
- Middleburgh (village), New York, also in Schoharie County
