= Armlin Hill =

Mountain in New York, United States

- Location within New York Adirondack Park Location within the United States

Highest point
- Elevation: 2,106 feet (642 m)
- Coordinates: 42°31′53″N 74°21′11″W

Geography
- Location: SSW of Middleburgh, New York, U.S.
- Topo map: USGS Middleburgh

Armlin Hill is a mountain in Schoharie County, New York. It is located south-southwest of Middleburgh. Gates Hill is located south and Hony Hill is located northeast of Armlin Hill.
