= Henry Bacon =

American architect (1866–1924)

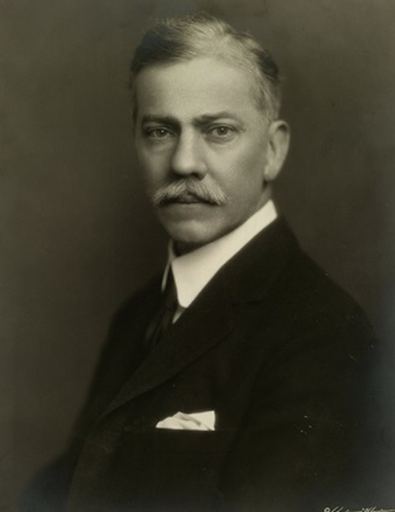
- Bacon, c. 1920
- Born: November 28, 1866; Watseka, Illinois, U.S.
- Died: February 16, 1924 (aged 57); New York City, U.S.
- Occupation: Architect
- Awards: AIA Gold Medal
- Projects: Lincoln Memorial; Lincoln Memorial Reflecting Pool

Henry Bacon (November 28, 1866 – February 16, 1924) was an American Beaux-Arts architect who oversaw the engineering and design of the Lincoln Memorial and the Lincoln Memorial Reflecting Pool in Washington, D.C., built between 1915 and 1922, shortly before his death in 1924.

== Early life and education ==
Bacon was born in Watseka, Illinois. He studied briefly at the University of Illinois, Urbana, in 1884, but left to begin his architectural career as a draftsman.

== Career ==
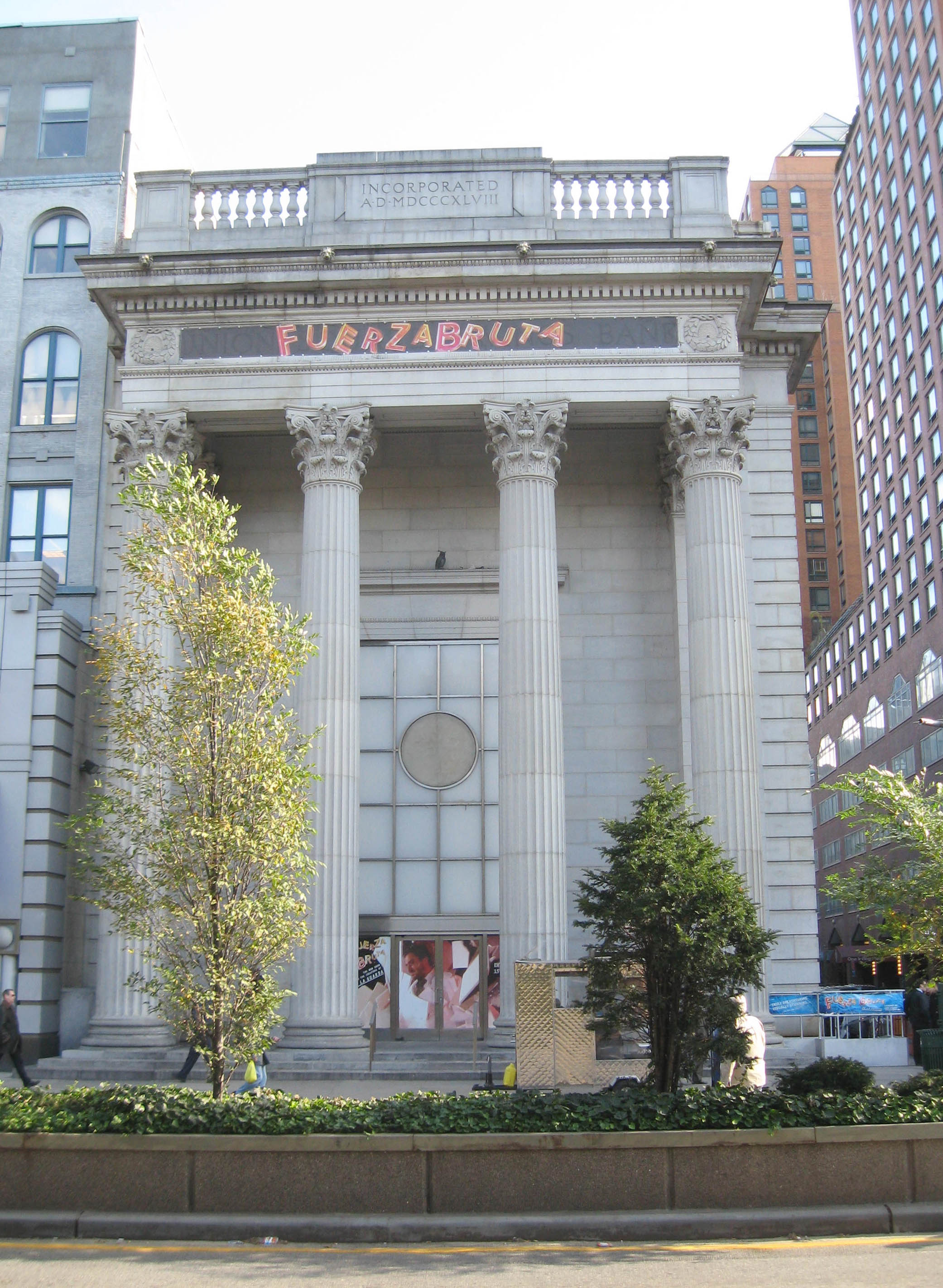
Union Square Savings Bank in Manhattan a New York City landmark, which is now the Daryl Roth Theatre

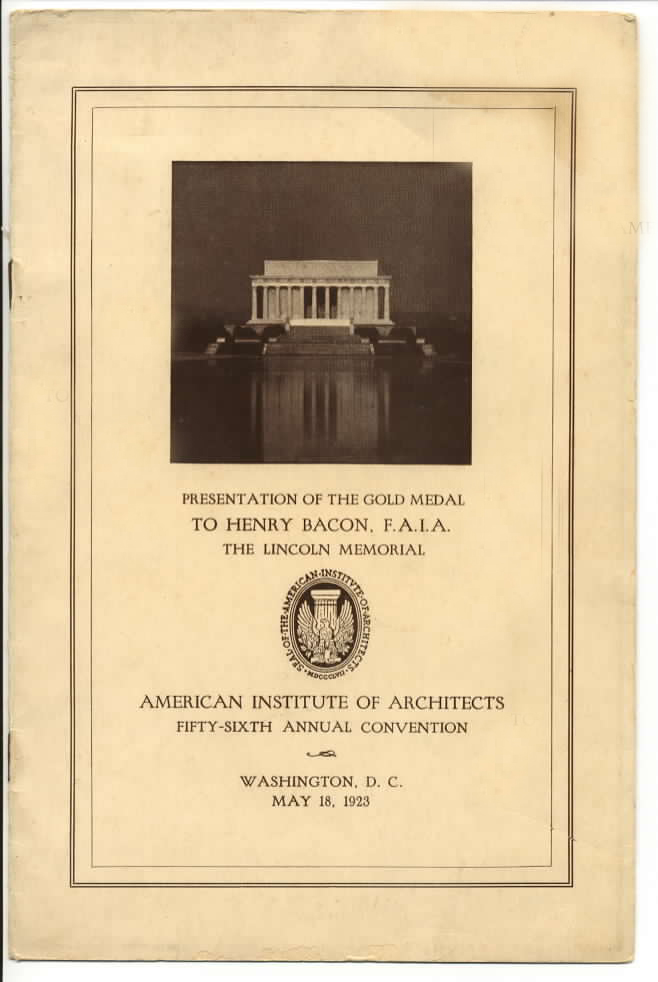
Program from the AIA Gold Medal presentation to Henry Bacon in 1923

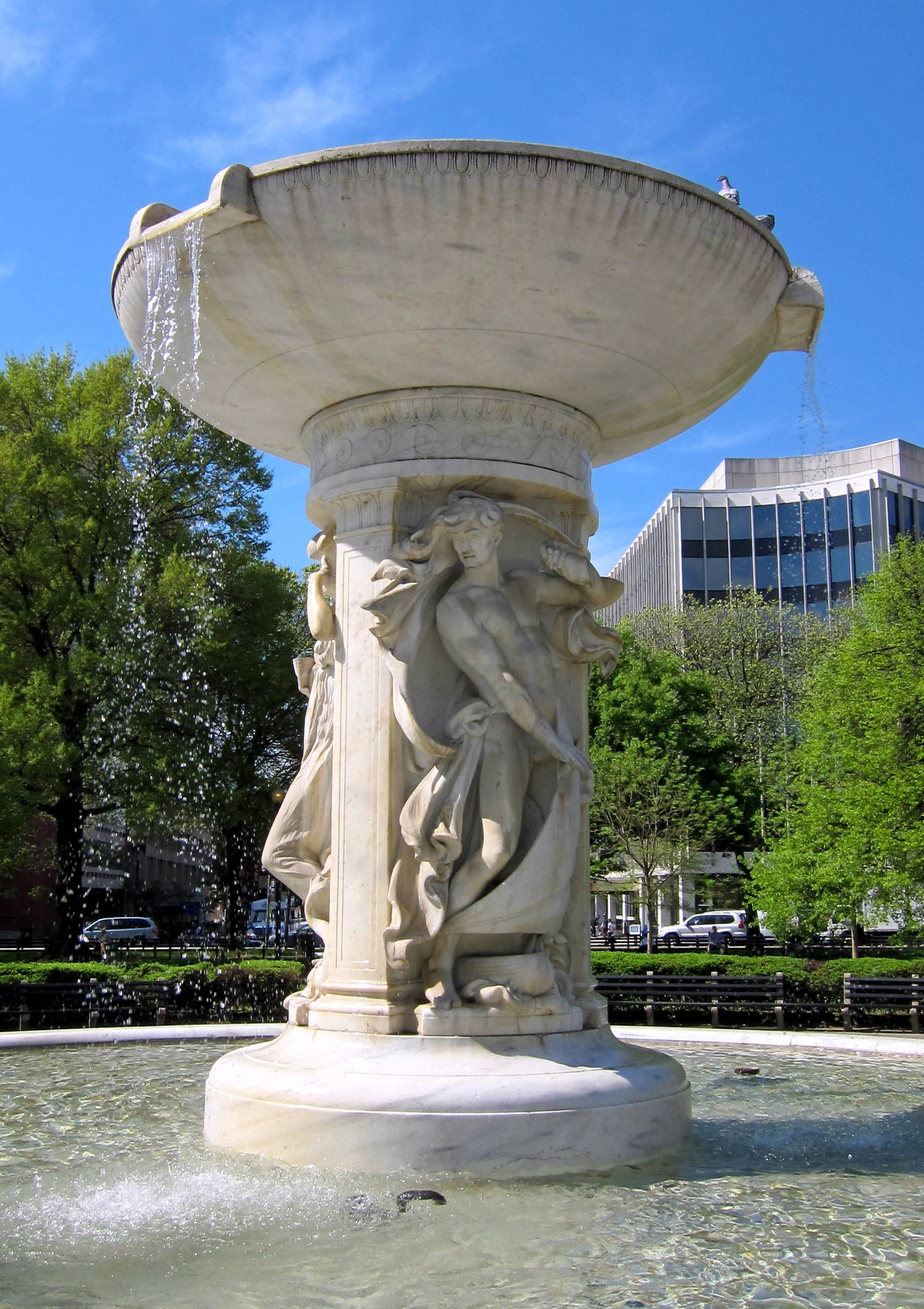
Dupont Circle Fountain in Washington, D.C.

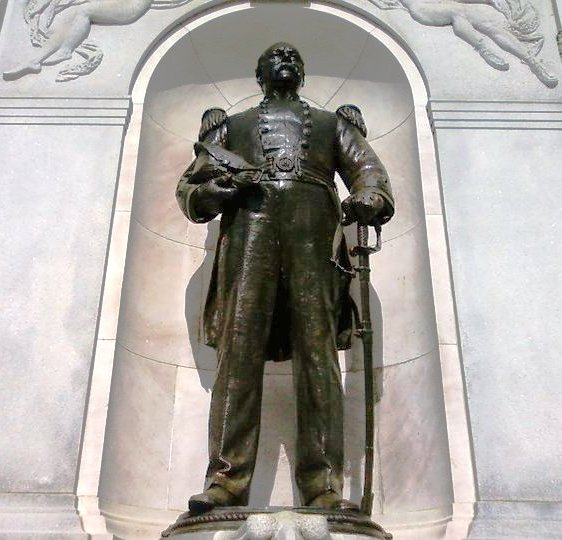
Commodore George Hamilton Perkins monument at the New Hampshire State House commemorating George H. Perkins, a U.S. Navy officer during the American Civil War

=== Early career ===
Bacon initially worked in the office of McKim, Mead & White in New York City, one of the best-known architectural firms at the time. His works of that period were in the late Greek Revival and Beaux-Arts styles with which the firm was associated. They included the 1889 World Expo in Paris, Boston Public Library in Boston, the New York Herald Building, Harvard Club of New York City, Columbia University's Morningside Heights campus, and Pennsylvania Station, each in New York City, and the World's Columbian Exposition in Chicago in 1893.

While at McKim, Mead & White, Bacon won, in 1889, the Rotch Traveling Scholarship for architectural students. This gave him two years of study and travel in Europe, which he spent learning and drawing details of Roman and Greek architecture. In Turkey, he met his future wife, Laura Florence Calvert, daughter of a British consul. He traveled with another fellowship student, Albert Kahn from Detroit, Michigan, who also went on to become a leading industrial architect.

After returning to the U.S., Bacon worked for a few more years with his mentor, Charles McKim, including on such projects as the Rhode Island State House in Providence, Rhode Island. He served as McKim's personal representative in Paris during the World Exposition in 1889 and in Chicago for the World's Columbian Exposition in 1893, for which McKim, Mead & White was designing several buildings.

In 1897, Bacon left with James Brite, a younger architect from the firm, to found the partnership of Brite and Bacon Architects. Brite was in charge of financial, administrative, and contracting aspects of the partnership, while Bacon was in charge of the architectural design and construction. The partnership immediately won the competition for the Jersey City, New Jersey's public library and the Hall of History (now Hurst Hall) for American University in Washington, D.C. They built a number of public buildings and a small number of private residences, which most notably included La Fetra Mansion in Summit, New Jersey.

The partnership was selected in 1897 to build three private residences: La Fetra Mansion; Laurel Hill, a three-story Georgian mansion in Columbia, North Carolina; and Donald MacRae House in Wilmington, North Carolina. The La Fetra Mansion was designed and built by Bacon, and his design was published in the September 1901 issue of Architecture, the preeminent architectural professional journal of its time. The LeFetra Mansion fully exhibits Bacon's preference for Beaux-Arts Neo-Greek and Roman architectural styles. His simple and elegant lines, and his skill in dimensions and proportions, were described as expressing a stately elegance, peaceful tranquility, and sense of divine protection.

=== Lincoln Memorial ===
In 1897, following the assassination of Abraham Lincoln, Bacon was also approached by a group, which had organized to raise public and private funds to build a monument in Washington, D.C., to memorialize President Abraham Lincoln. Bacon began his conceptual, artistic, and architectural design for the Lincoln Memorial that year. He continued in the effort, although the funding to build the project was not secured until years later. The Brite and Bacon Partnership dissolved in 1902, partly resulting from Brite's disagreement over Bacon's passion and the unpaid time he spent on the memorial design.

=== Prominent buildings and monuments ===
After that, Bacon practiced under his own name with significant success, building a large number of public buildings and monuments which became renowned, until his death in 1924. His later works included the Danforth Memorial Library in Paterson, New Jersey, in 1908, the Ridgewood, New Jersey 1924 War Memorial in Van Neste Park; the train station in Naugatuck, Connecticut; Waterbury Hospital Waterbury, Connecticut; Court of the Four Seasons at the Panama–Pacific International Exposition in San Francisco in 1915; World War I Memorial at Yale University in New Haven, Connecticut, the Lincoln Memorial in Washington, D.C., the Confederate Memorial in Wilmington, North Carolina; and many other distinguished public buildings and monuments.

In 1913, Bacon was elected into the National Academy of Design as an associate member, and he became a full member in 1917.

Bacon was very active as a designer of monuments and settings for public sculpture. He designed the Court of the Four Seasons for the 1915 Panama Pacific Exposition in San Francisco, and the World War I Memorial at Yale University. He collaborated with sculptor Augustus Saint-Gaudens on the Sen. Mark Hanna Monument in Cleveland, Ohio, and with Daniel Chester French on several monuments, notably the Lincoln Memorial's pensive colossal Lincoln. Olin Memorial Library, one of Bacon's buildings at Wesleyan University, houses many of Bacon's documents and blueprints of the Lincoln Memorial.

Bacon rarely found time to design private residences. There are three known residential projects that are clearly his work. The first is the La Fetra Mansion in Summit, New Jersey, designed and built by the firm of Brite & Bacon from 1897 to 1900. Bacon skillfully integrated into a residential setting many of his signature Greek Revival and Roman Renaissance elements and proportions. The resulting elegance was astoundingly masterful. The La Fetra Mansion was commissioned by industrialist Harold A. La Fetra of the Royal Baking Powder Company, which later merged with RJR Nabisco. The second is Donald McRae House in Wilmington, North Carolina, built for his close friend Donald McRae.

The third Bacon-designed private residence is Chesterwood House, which he designed for his friend, the noted sculptor Daniel Chester French, as his summer home and studio at Stockbridge, Massachusetts. Its exterior bears similarity to the La Fetra Mansion.

Bacon served as a member of the U.S. Commission of Fine Arts from 1921 until his death in 1924.

In May 1923, President Warren G. Harding presented Bacon with the American Institute of Architects's Gold Medal, making him the sixth recipient of the honor.

== Death and legacy ==
Bacon died of cancer in New York City, and he is buried at Oakdale Cemetery in Wilmington, North Carolina.

During World War II, a U.S. Navy Liberty Ship, the SS Henry Bacon, was named for Bacon. It was commissioned on November 11, 1942. In 1964, sculptor Joseph Kiselewski created the Henry Bacon Medal for Memorial Architecture, cast in bronze by the Medallic Arts Company in honor of Bacon.

== Notable monuments and public buildings ==
- Lincoln Memorial in Washington, D.C.
- Danforth Memorial Library in Paterson, New Jersey
- Naugatuck station, Connecticut
- Great War Memorial, in Naugatuck, Connecticut, c. 1920
- Van Vleck Observatory, the Olin Memorial Library, the Eclectic Society House, and many dormitories and other buildings at Wesleyan University in Middletown, Connecticut
- Union Square Savings Bank, now Daryl Roth Theatre, in Manhattan, New York
- Ambrose Swasey Pavilion (1916) in Exeter, New Hampshire
- Chelsea Savings Bank in Chelsea, Massachusetts
- Halle Brothers Department Store in Cleveland, Ohio
- The Eseeola Lodge in Linville, North Carolina
- Waterbury General Hospital in Waterbury, Connecticut
- National City Bank in New Rochelle, New York
- Citizens & Manufacturers National Bank in Waterbury, Connecticut
- First Congregational Church in Providence, Rhode Island
- Gates for the University of Virginia in Charlottesville, Virginia
- Woodmere High School in Woodmere, New York
- Public Bath in Brooklyn, New York
- Foster Mausoleum at Upper Middleburgh Cemetery in Middleburgh, New York
- Perry Memorial Arch at Seaside Park in Bridgeport, Connecticut
- Illinois Centennial Monument in Chicago, Illinois
- Westlawn Mausoleum in Omaha, Nebraska

== Architectural settings, bases and exedra for sculpture ==
- Bonney Memorial (1898), Francis Edwin Elwell, sculptor, Lowell Cemetery, Lowell, Massachusetts
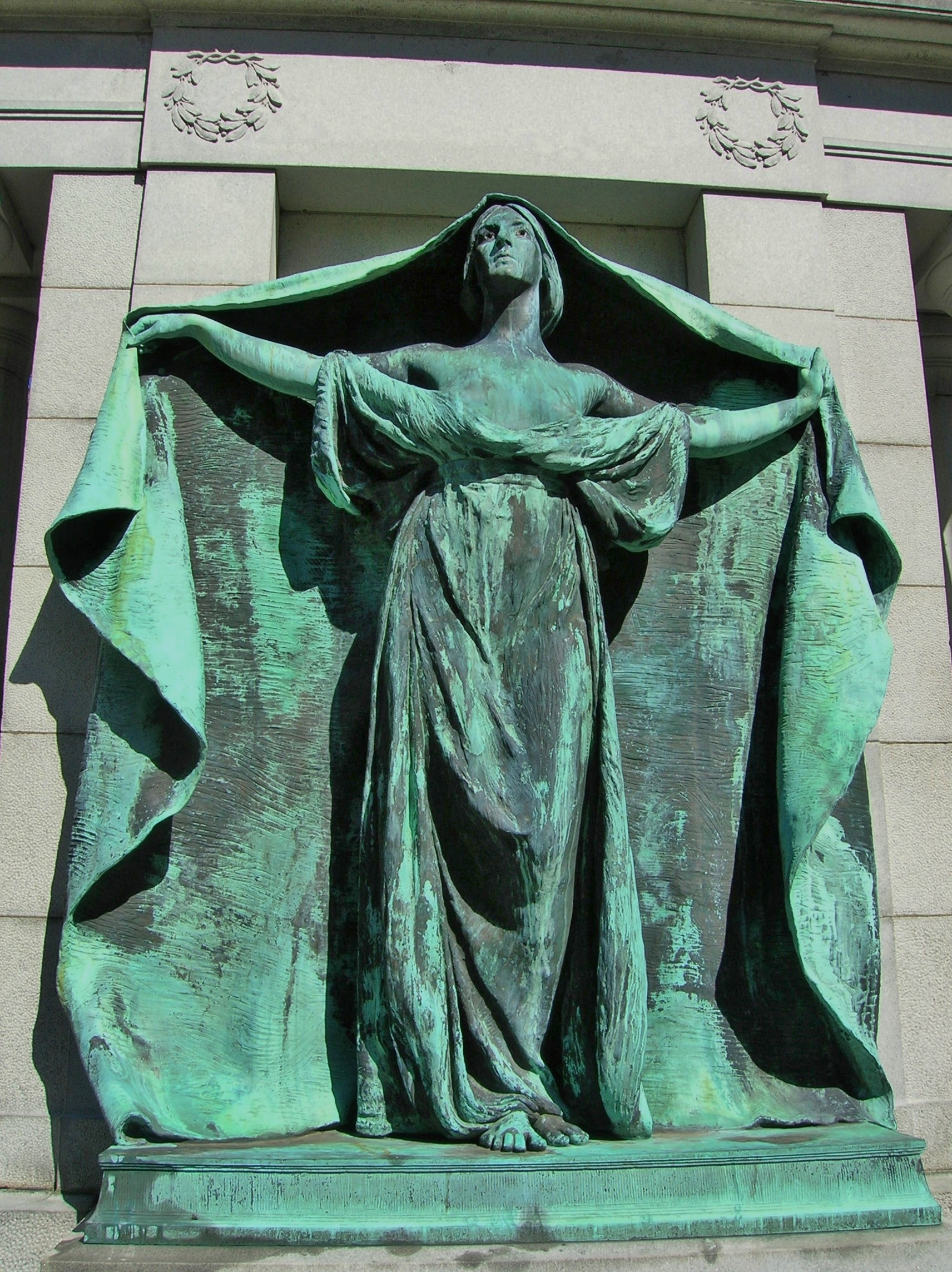
  Bonney Memorial (1898), Lowell Cemetery
- Commodore George Hamilton Perkins, (1902), Daniel Chester French, sculptor, New Hampshire State House, Concord, New Hampshire
- Roswell Pettibone Flower Monument, (1902), Augustus Saint-Gaudens, sculptor, Watertown, New York
- Col. James Anderson Monument, (1904), Daniel Chester French, sculptor, Allegheny Square, Pittsburgh, Pennsylvania
- Melvin Memorial (1906-1908), Daniel Chester French, sculptor, Sleepy Hollow Cemetery, Concord, Massachusetts
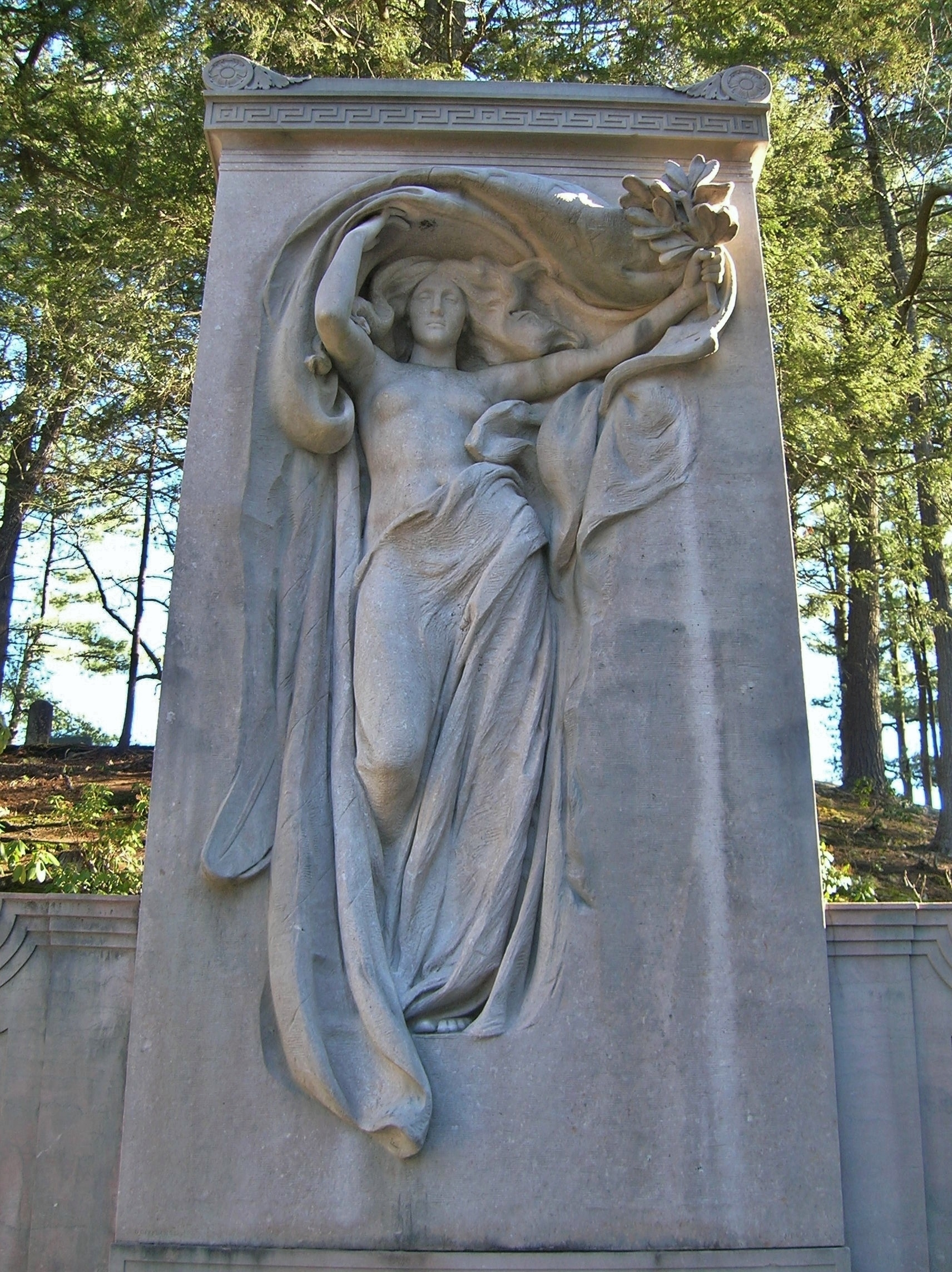
  Melvin Memorial (1908), Sleepy Hollow Cemetery, Concord, Massachusetts
- August Robert Meyer Memorial, (1909) Daniel Chester French, sculptor, Kansas City, Missouri
- Statue of Samuel Spencer, (1910) Daniel Chester French sculptor, carved by the Piccirilli Brothers, Atlanta, Georgia
- James Oglethorpe Monument, (1910) Daniel Chester French sculptor, Savannah, Georgia
- Burnside Fountain, (1912) by Charles Y. Harvey, Worcester Common, Worcester, Massachusetts
- Prehn Mausoleum, (1912) Karl Bitter sculptor, carved by the Piccirilli Brothers, Cedar Lawn Cemetery, Paterson, New Jersey
- Abraham Lincoln 1912 statue by Daniel Chester French, Lincoln, Nebraska, 1912.
- Carl Schurz Monument, (1913) Karl Bitter sculptor, Morningside Park, New York City
- Henry Wadsworth Longfellow Monument, (1914), Daniel Chester French, sculptor, Longfellow Park, Cambridge, Massachusetts
- Lafayette Memorial, (1917), Daniel Chester French sculptor, Prospect Park, Brooklyn, New York
- Ruth Anne Dodge Memorial, (1918), Daniel Chester French sculptor, Fairview Cemetery, Council Bluffs, Iowa
- Depew Memorial Fountain, (1919), Karl Bitter and Alexander Stirling Calder sculptors, University Park, Indianapolis, Indiana
- Russell Alger Memorial Fountain, (1921), Daniel Chester French, sculptor, Grand Circus Park, Detroit, Michigan
- Dupont Circle Fountain, (1921), Daniel Chester French sculptor, Dupont Circle, Washington, D.C.
- Statue of the Marquis de Lafayette, (1921), Daniel Chester French sculptor, Easton, Pennsylvania
- Alexander Hamilton Monument, (1923), James Earle Fraser sculptor, Washington, D.C.
- Jesse Parker Williams Memorial, (c. 1924), Daniel Chester French sculptor, Westview Cemetery, Atlanta, Georgia
- American Revolutionary War Memorial, (c. 1915), Daniel Chester French sculptor, Jno. Williams, Inc. (NY) founder, Danville, Illinois
