= Constantine Seferlis =

American sculptor

Constantine L. Seferlis (1930–2005) was a sculptor and stone carver whose works exemplified a group of public monumental artists in the United States during the second half of the 20th century. Many of these stone masters were immigrants, primarily from southern Europe, including Italy and Greece, and they trained and worked in the classical milieu. Seferlis himself was born near Sparta, Greece, and, because of his precocious talent, was enrolled at an early age in the National Academy of Fine Arts in Athens. It was at the National Academy that Seferlis developed his artistic voice, his naturalistic style, and his love for the medium of stone.

== Work ==
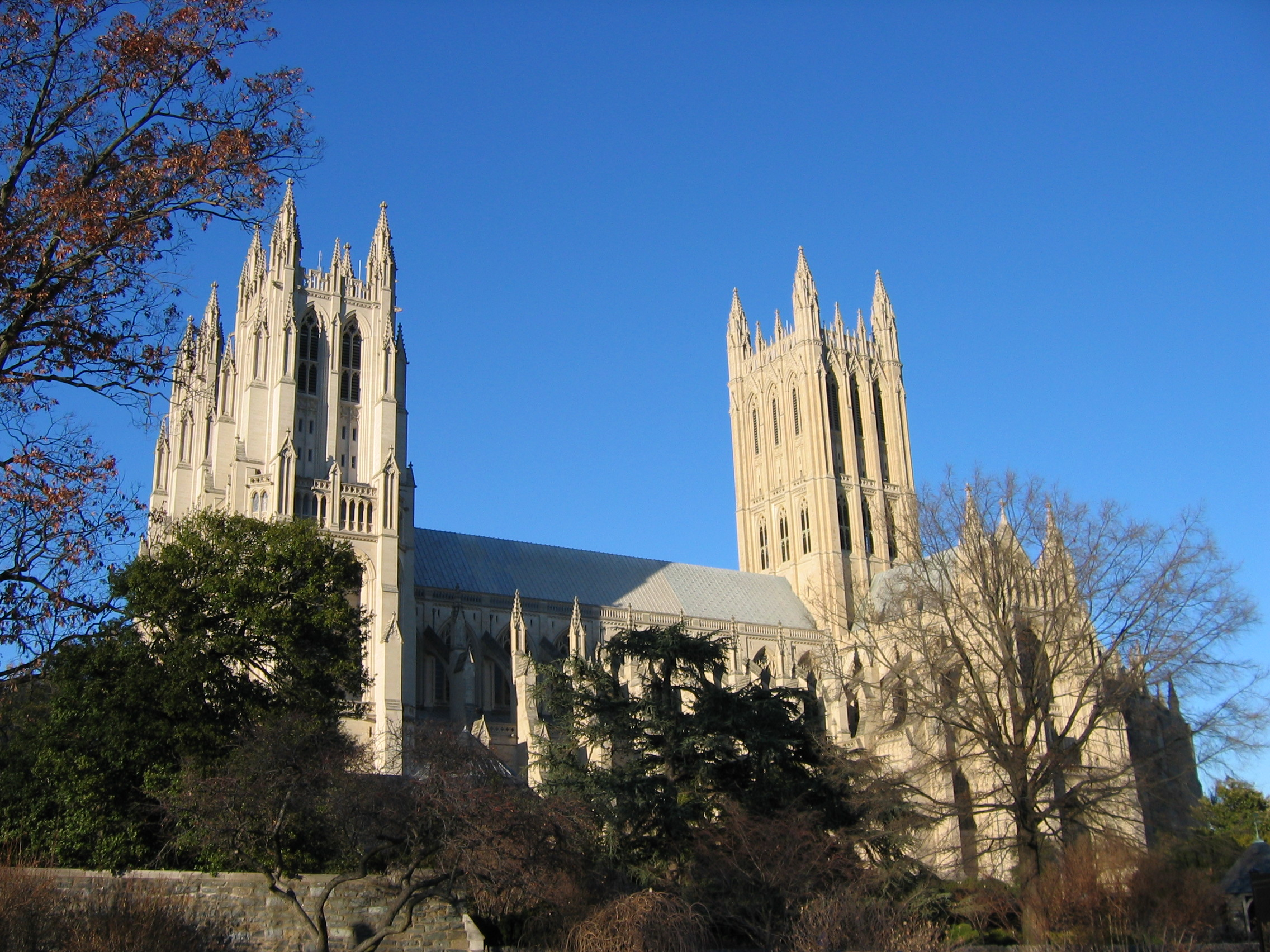
The Washington National Cathedral

Seferlis immigrated to the Washington, D.C., area in the latter part of the 1950s. His skill was already evident in the sculptures he carved at the National Shrine of the Immaculate Conception, his first job in the United States. Two years later, he started work on the National Cathedral.

Over the next two decades, he worked on the cathedral's various ongoing interior and exterior construction projects. The National Cathedral was declared completed in 1990, almost nine decades after the cornerstone was laid, though restoration, elaboration, and intense maintenance continue to the present day. Seferlis’ contributions to the Cathedral take the form of limestone gargoyles, grotesques, capitals, pinnacles, saints, angels, keystones, bosses, column capitals, and freestanding figural sculptures of historical personages such as Helen Keller and Pope John XXIII.

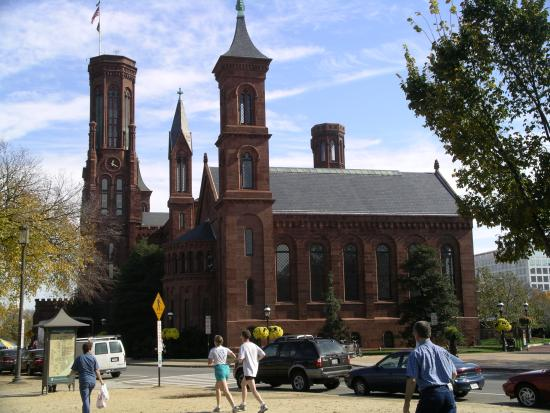
The Smithsonian Castle on the National Mall

In addition to the Shrine and the cathedral, Seferlis enthusiastically undertook a number of high-profile restoration projects on both public and private buildings. He carved elaborate capitals used in restoring the Corinthian columns of the east front of the U.S. Capitol building. Under the auspices of the National Park Service, he worked on restoring or replacing a number of the almost 200 historical commemorative stones that line the granite interior of the Washington Monument. For the Smithsonian Institution, Seferlis worked on renovating the façade of the emblematic Smithsonian Castle; carved exterior gates and finials; and restored the statue of St. Dunstan donated to the Institution by Westminster Abbey.

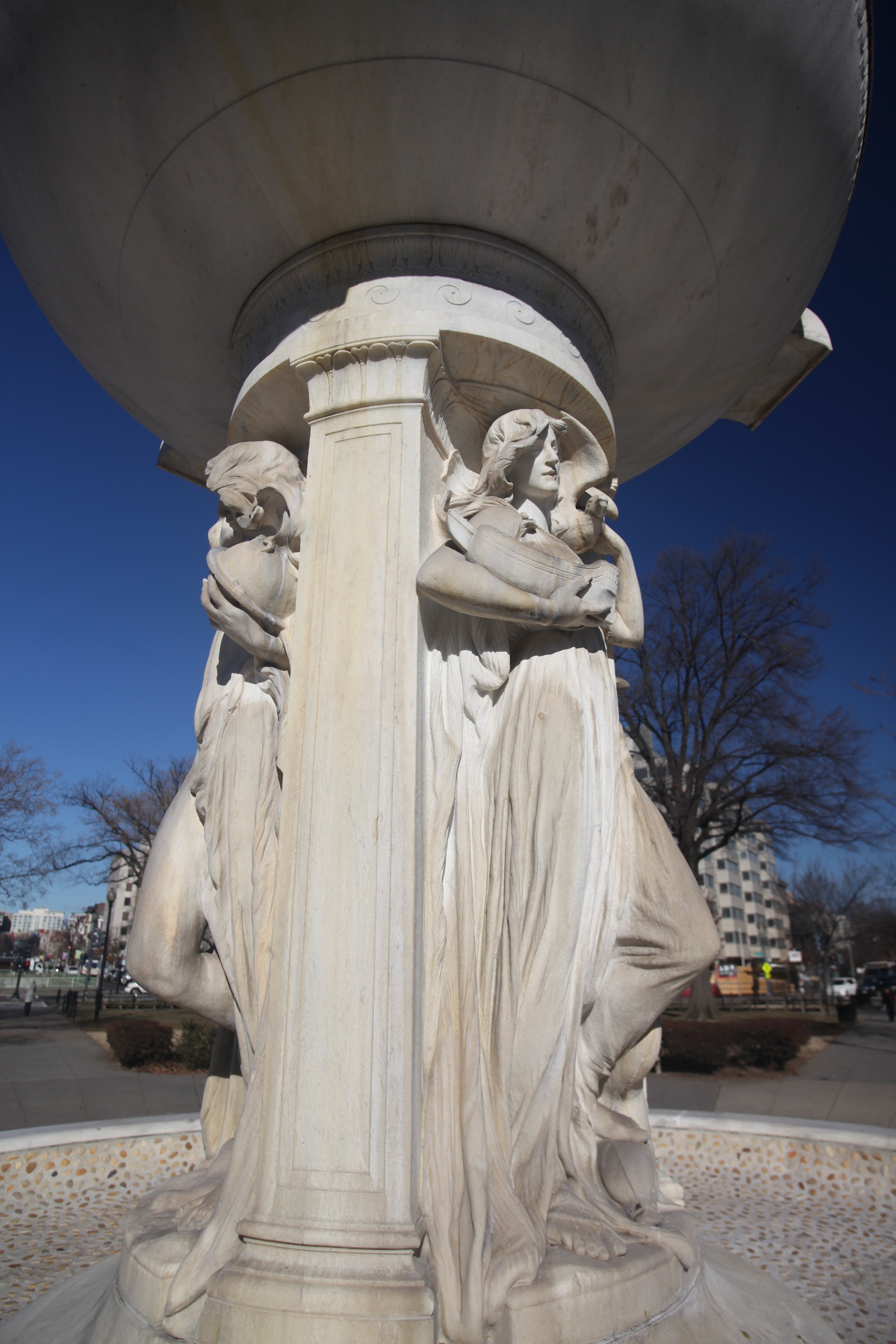
The fountain in Dupont Circle depicting the seas and the stars. The wind is on the north side.

He also restored and renovated a number of famous fountains in the Washington, D.C., area, including the Dupont Circle fountain and the swan fountain in the French parterre at Hillwood Museum and Gardens (the Washington residence of Marjorie Merriweather Post).

Seferlis mounted several major exhibitions at prestigious venues, including the National Academy of Design and National Sculpture Society in New York. As a result of his highly regarded figural and ornamental sculptures, he was awarded a number of sought-after prizes in recognition of his artistic contributions. In 1971, he was inducted into the National Sculpture Society, followed by membership in the National Academy of Design in 1974.

Seferlis’ works, along with those of his colleagues, were highlighted for a wider audience in the documentary, “The Stone Carvers” (1984). This half-hour-long film won the Academy Award for Best Documentary, Short Subjects in 1985 for filmmakers Marjorie Hunt and Paul Wagner. After being broadcast on public television, the short also won an Emmy.

== Personal life ==
Outside of his artistic practice, Seferlis mentored younger artists.

He also reached out to the public to make them aware of the importance of stone carving and the arts in general by teaching at a number of museums, academic institutions, and continuing education programs in Washington, DC, Maryland, and Virginia. Among his many students was his own son Andy.

Seferlis died in March 2005.
