= Gates Hill (Schoharie County, New York) =

Mountain in New York, United States

- Location within New York Adirondack Park Location within the United States

Highest point
- Elevation: 2,106 feet (642 m)
- Coordinates: 42°31′26″N 74°20′48″W

Geography
- Location: SSW of Middleburgh, New York, U.S.
- Topo map: USGS Middleburgh

Gates Hill is a mountain in Schoharie County, New York. It is located south-southwest of Middleburgh. Armlin Hill is located north and Hony Hill is located north-northeast of Gates Hill.
