= La Fetra Mansion =

Coordinates: 40.724484°N 74.354782°W

La Fetra Mansion located in Summit, New Jersey, United States, is a mansion designed and built for industrialist H. A. LaFetra of the Royal Baking Powder Company (known today as NJR Nabisco Company) by Henry Bacon (November 28, 1866 – February 17, 1924), the same year he founded his architectural firm, Brite and Bacon. He is best known for his last work, the Lincoln Memorial in Washington, D.C. Since its completion in 1899, this mansion has been owned by industry leaders.

The home, with 8,000 square feet (740 m^{2}) of living space on the first two floors, and more than 2,000 square feet (190 m^{2}) on the third floor, was featured in the September 1901 issue of Architecture Magazine, the professional journal of the industry. It has been one of the premier properties in this area for over a century.

== Description ==
The La Fetra Mansion was renovated and updated from 1991 through 2013, with priority in preserving its artistic, material, and workmanship integrity, while upgrading and modernizing its infrastructure. A pair of elaborately carved, solid oak doors on the south side leads to an expansive entry foyer more than two floors in height at the rear, with marble floors and a large hanging chandelier. Massive, solid black chestnut (deep brown in color) sliding doors separate the expansive foyer from the grand living room. To the north of the entry foyer is a large portico, which overlooks landscaped grounds.

The main staircase and hallways are very wide and decorated with elegant carvings and a 12 ft × 12 ft stained glass windows at the landing between the first and second floors.

The first floor has 12-foot-high ceilings, antique tile work, rare wood carving and paneling, hand wrought moldings, and three fireplaces. The grand, oversized formal living and dining rooms have fireplaces with carved mantels, black chestnut paneling and coffered high ceilings in the living room, and unusual detailed moldings and ornate leaded-glass windows. The 30 ft × 20 ft kitchen has elegant furniture-style maple cabinets, top-of-the line European appliances, granite counter top, butler's pantry, a family eating area, and a generous family relaxation and entertainment area. In addition, there is a large library, a bedroom suite with full bath, a conservatory, a powder room, solid oak back stairs, and a service entrance with mud-room.

The second floor has 10-foot-high ceilings throughout, 7 large bedrooms, wide halls, oversized windows, solid wood doors, elaborate moldings, 4 full baths, and a music hall leading to a large balcony. The rooms on this floor are divided into three wings: the main west and east wings, and a guest/office wing with its own kitchenette and full bath.

In the Master suite, the bedroom has a 12-foot-high tray ceiling, sky light, and 4 large elegant windows. The master bath has 20-foot-high ceilings, a Jacuzzi tub framed by two large windows and a wall mirror, solid cherry and marble vanity, a large steam shower, and a solid-cherry spiral staircase, which leads up to an exercise/yoga gallery.

The third floor has a large opel suite, a large open entertainment area, and a very large master studio and a yoga/meditation gallery. The full basement has a large laundry room, a half bath, and expansive areas for movie theater, wine cellar, band practice, billiard room, and gym. The basement and foundations are constructed with 1.5-foot-thick solid granite blocks.

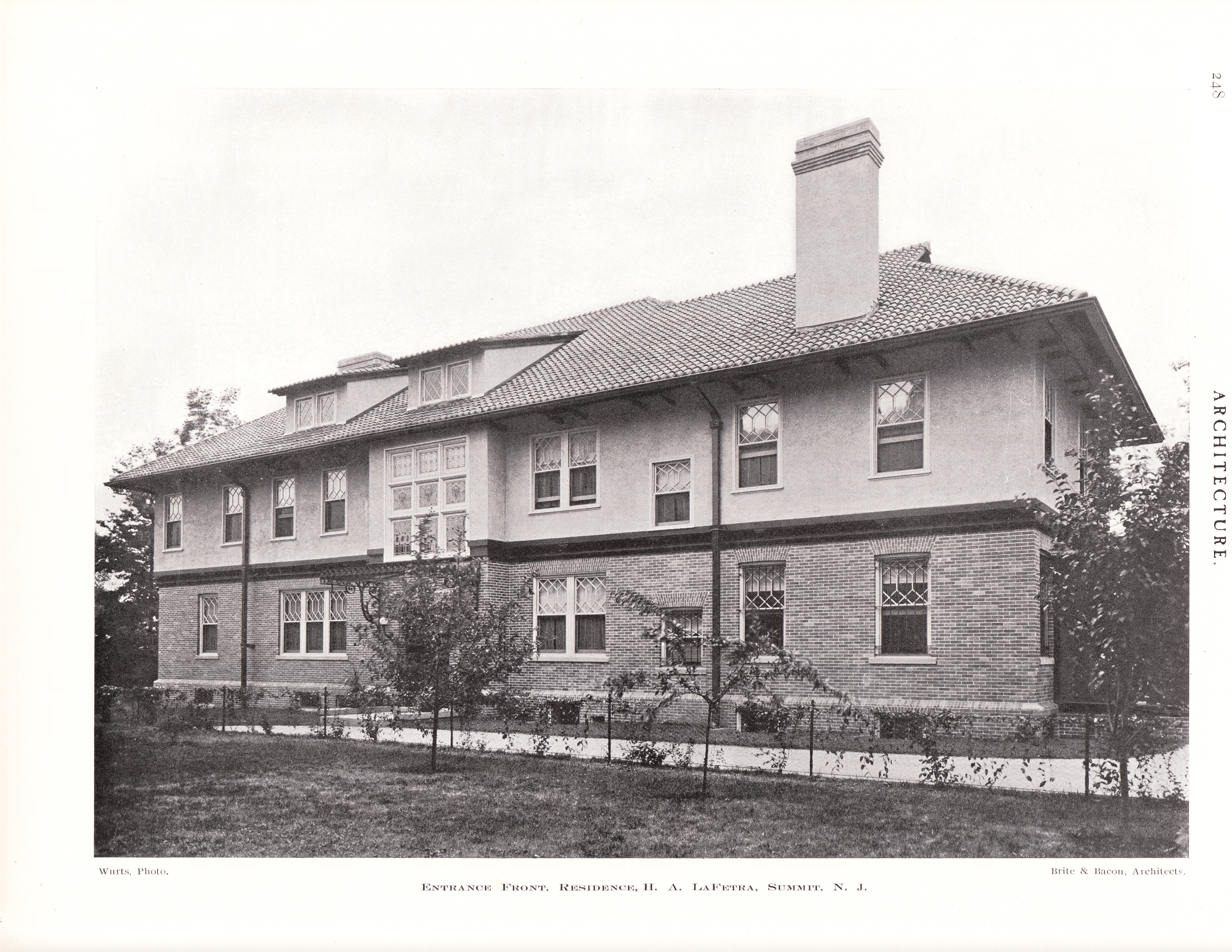
Henry Bacon, Summit, NJ, 1901

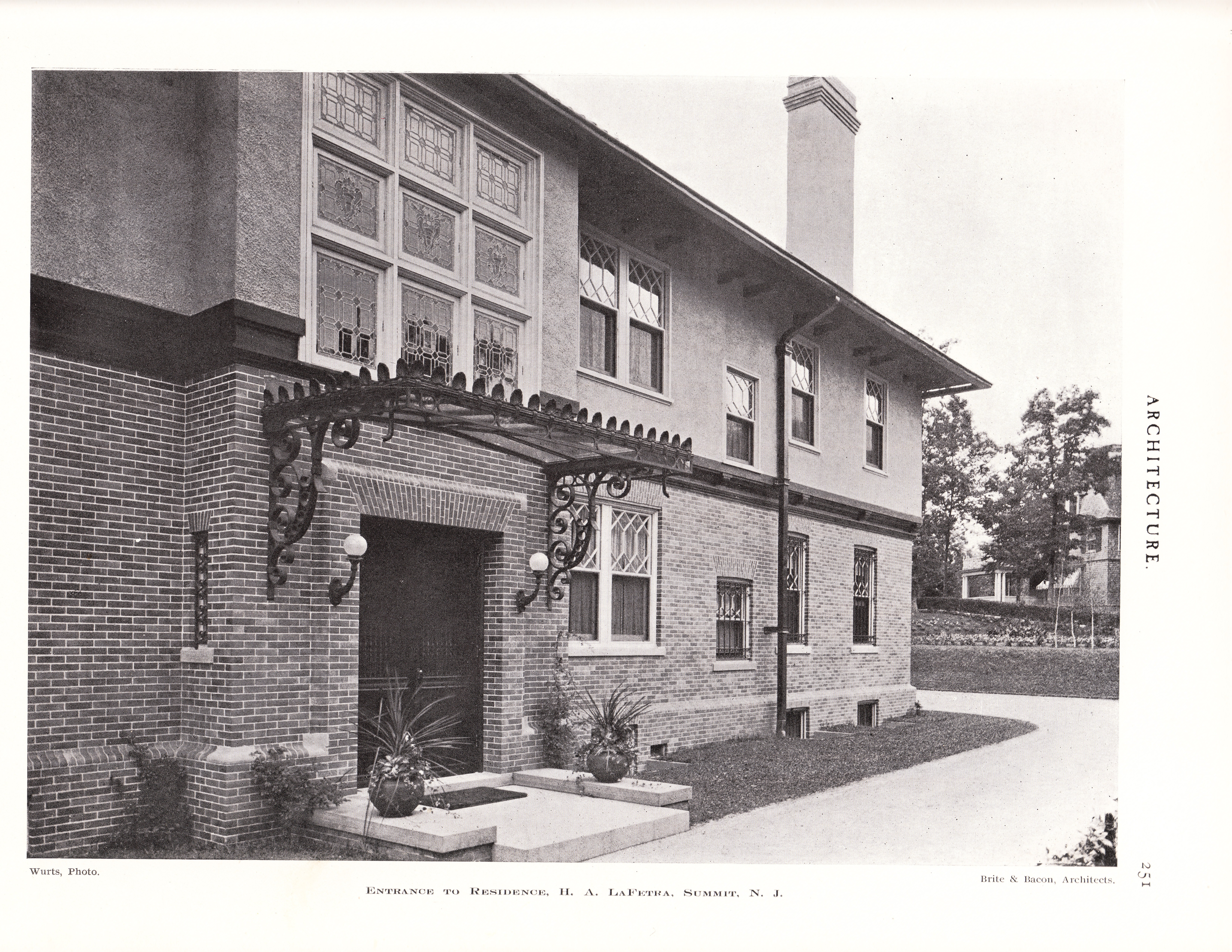
Henry Bacon, Summit, NJ, 1901, front entrance

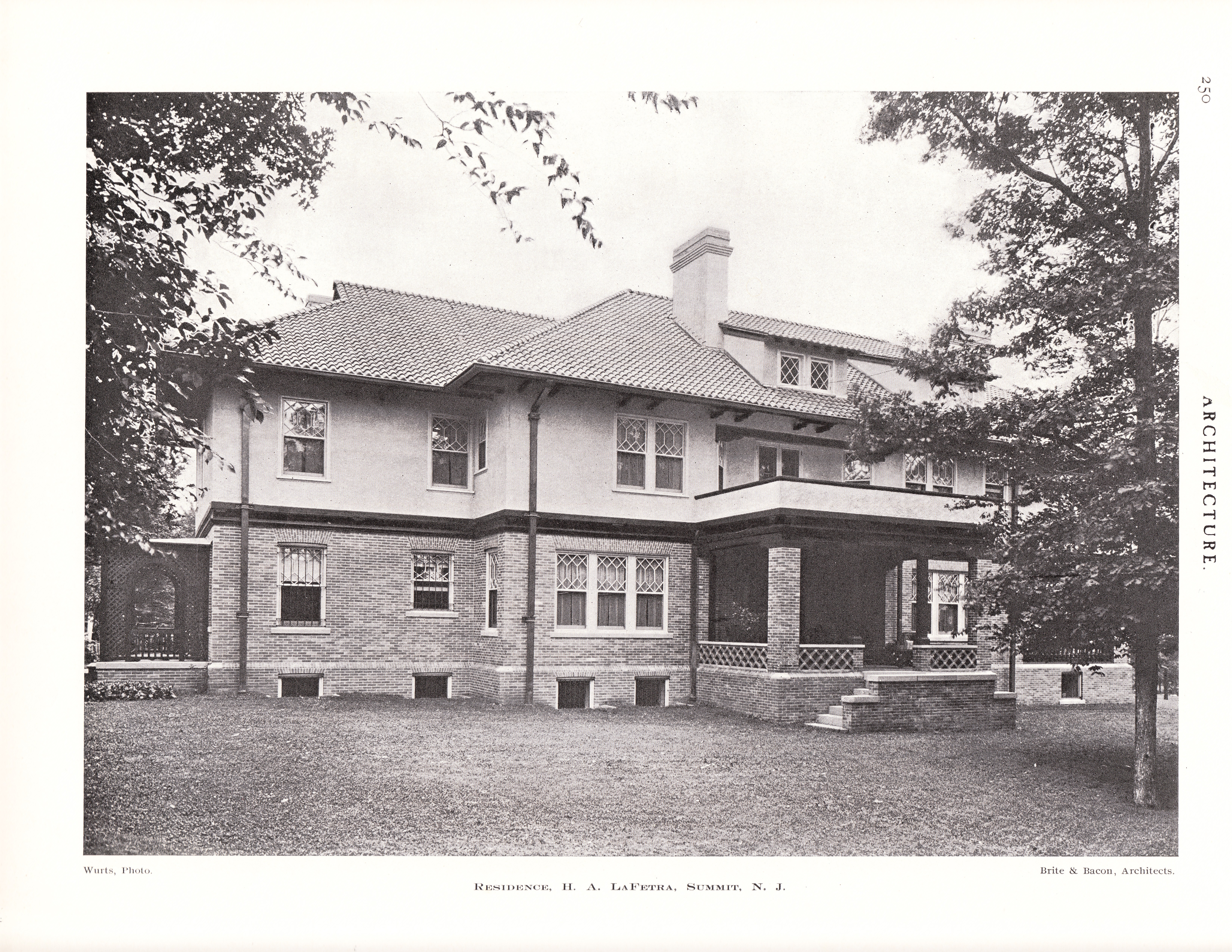
Henry Bacon, Summit, NJ, 1901, back entrance

Living room

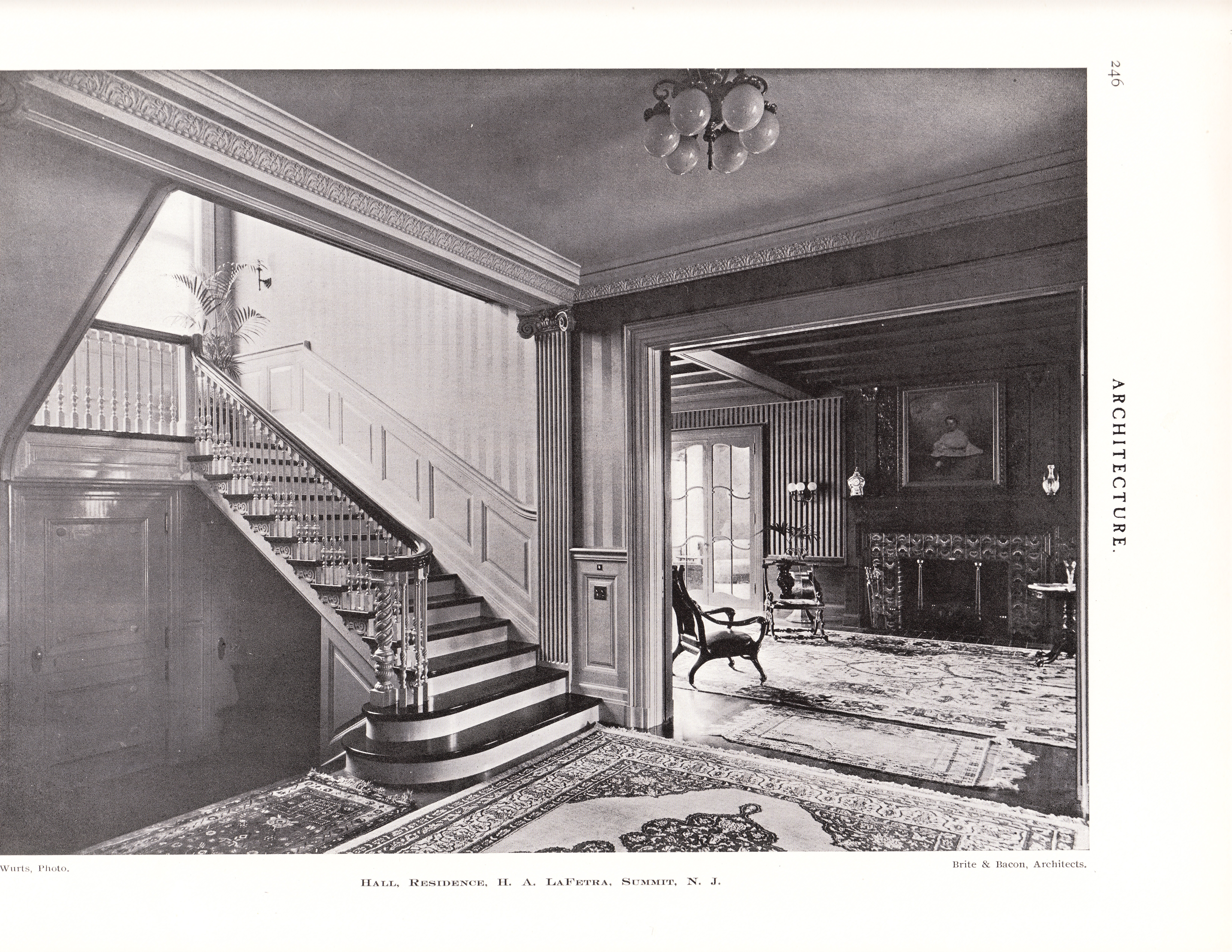
Henry Bacon, Summit, NJ, 1901, main staircase

Henry Bacon, Summit, NJ, 1901, first and second story plans

Architecture magazine, 1901

== Pictures from ==
- Sotheby's
- Owners, the Hendel family, Summit, New Jersey
- Architecture magazine, 1901
