= United States Post Office (Delhi, New York) =

- US Post Office-Delhi
- U.S. National Register of Historic Places
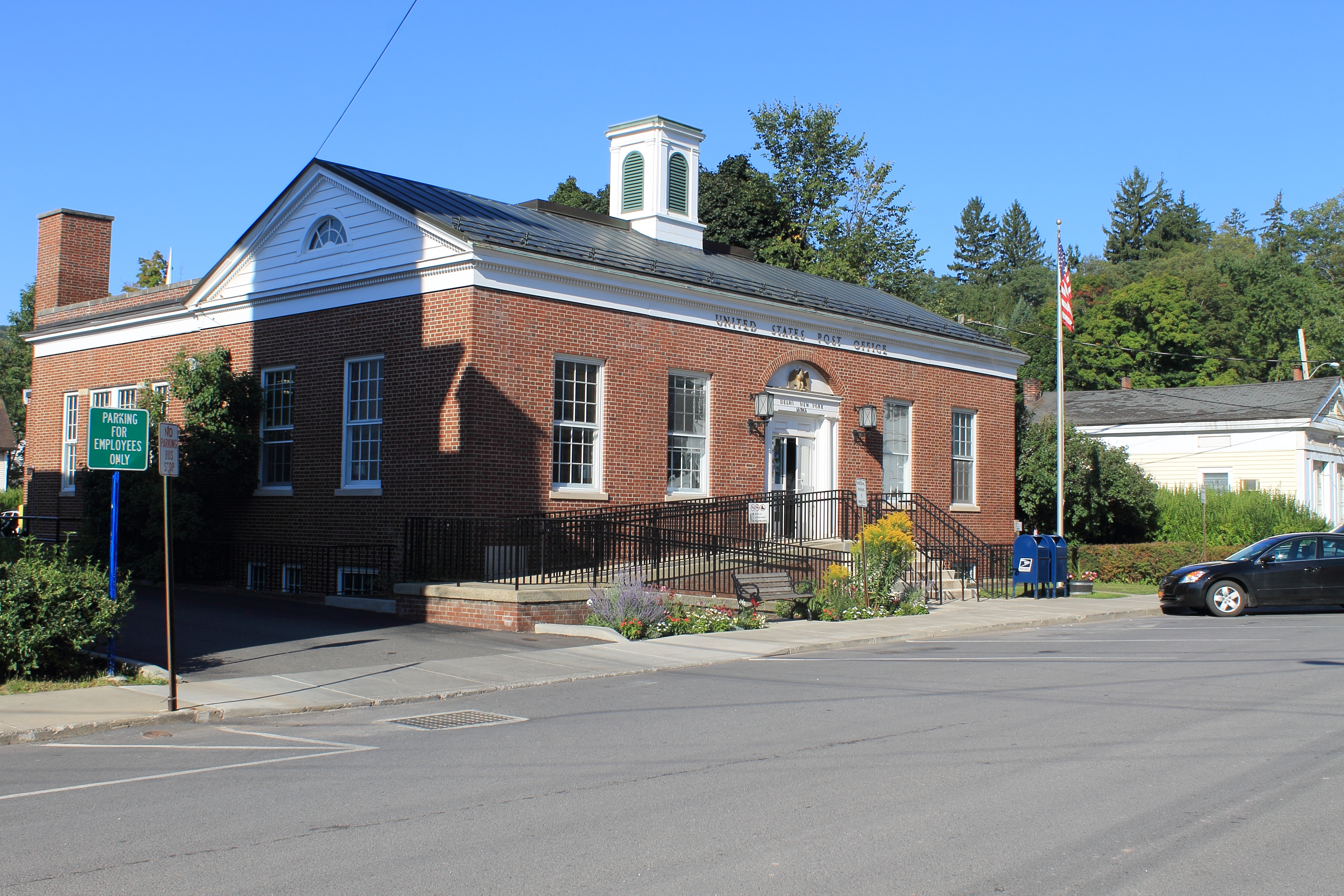

- Location within New York Location within the United States
- Interactive map showing the location of the U.S Post Office-Delhi
- Location: 10 Court St., Delhi, New York
- Coordinates: 42°16′40″N 74°55′7″W
- Area: less than one acre
- Built: 1938
- Architect: Simon, Louis A.; Earley, Mary
- Architectural style: Colonial Revival
- MPS: US Post Offices in New York State, 1858-1943, TR
- NRHP reference No.: 88002477
- Added to NRHP: November 17, 1988

US Post Office-Delhi is a historic post office building located at Delhi in Delaware County, New York, United States. It was built in 1938, and is one of a number of post offices in New York State designed by the Office of the Supervising Architect of the Treasury Department, Louis A. Simon. It is a symmetrically massed one story brick building with a stone watertable in the Colonial Revival style. The front section features a copper clad gable roof crowned by a square flat-topped cupola with Doric order pilasters and round arched vent openings on each face. The interior features a 1940 mural by artist Mary Earley titled Down-Rent War, Around 1845.

It was listed on the National Register of Historic Places in 1988.

== See also ==
- National Register of Historic Places listings in Delaware County, New York
