= United States Post Office (Middleburgh, New York) =

- US Post Office–Middleburgh
- U.S. National Register of Historic Places
- Location within New York Location within the United States
- Location: 300 Main St., Middleburgh, New York
- Coordinates: 42°35′52″N 74°20′2″W
- Area: less than one acre
- Built: 1939
- Architect: Simon, Louis A.; Earley, Mary
- Architectural style: Colonial Revival
- MPS: US Post Offices in New York State, 1858-1943, TR
- NRHP reference No.: 88002352
- Added to NRHP: May 11, 1989

US Post Office–Middleburgh is a historic post office building located at Middleburgh in Schoharie County, New York, United States. It was designed and built 1939–1940, and is one of a number of post offices in New York State designed by the Office of the Supervising Architect of the Treasury Department under Louis A. Simon. The building is in the Colonial Revival style and is a one-story, five-bay, steel frame structure on a raised concrete foundation. The interior features a 1941 mural by Mary Earley titled Dance of the Hop Pickers.

It was listed on the National Register of Historic Places in 1989.
