= Mary Earley =

American artist (1900–1992)

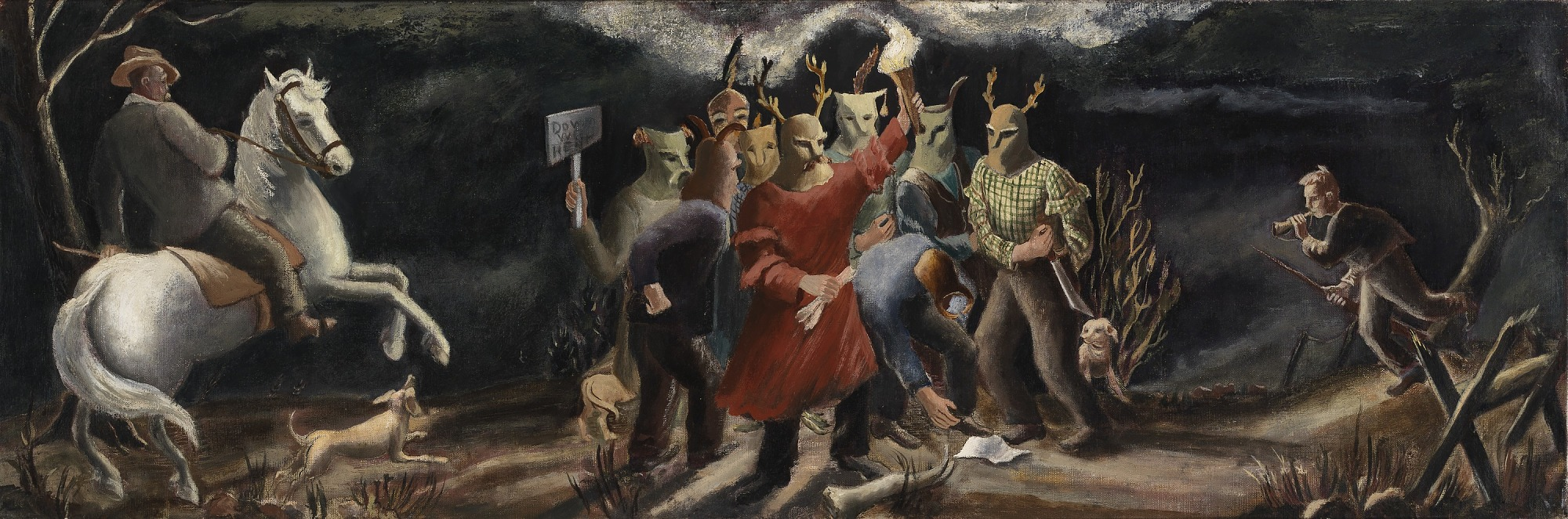
Study for Down Rent War, Around 1845 (1940), Earley's post office mural in Delhi, New York

Mary Earley (1900 – 1992) was an American painter known for her New Deal era murals.

== Biography ==
Born 1900, in St. Louis, Earley moved to Chicago with her family and then located to New York City. She attended the Art Students League of New York where she studied with Kenneth Hayes Miller, Kimon Nicolaïdes, and William C. Palmer.

In 1940, Earley's mural Down-Rent War, Around 1845 was installed in the Delhi, New York post office. It was sponsored by the Treasury Section of Fine Arts (TSFA). The mural was one of the winner of the New Deal 48-State Competition Post Office murals. In 1941, Earley's mural Dance of the Hop Pickers was installed in the Middleburgh, New York post office. It was sponsored by the TSFA.

Earley died in 1992, aged 91 or 92.

Earley's study for the Down-Rent War, Around 1845 is in the Smithsonian American Art Museum.
