= Dr. Christopher S. Best House and Office =

Historic house in New York, United States

- U.S. National Register of Historic Places
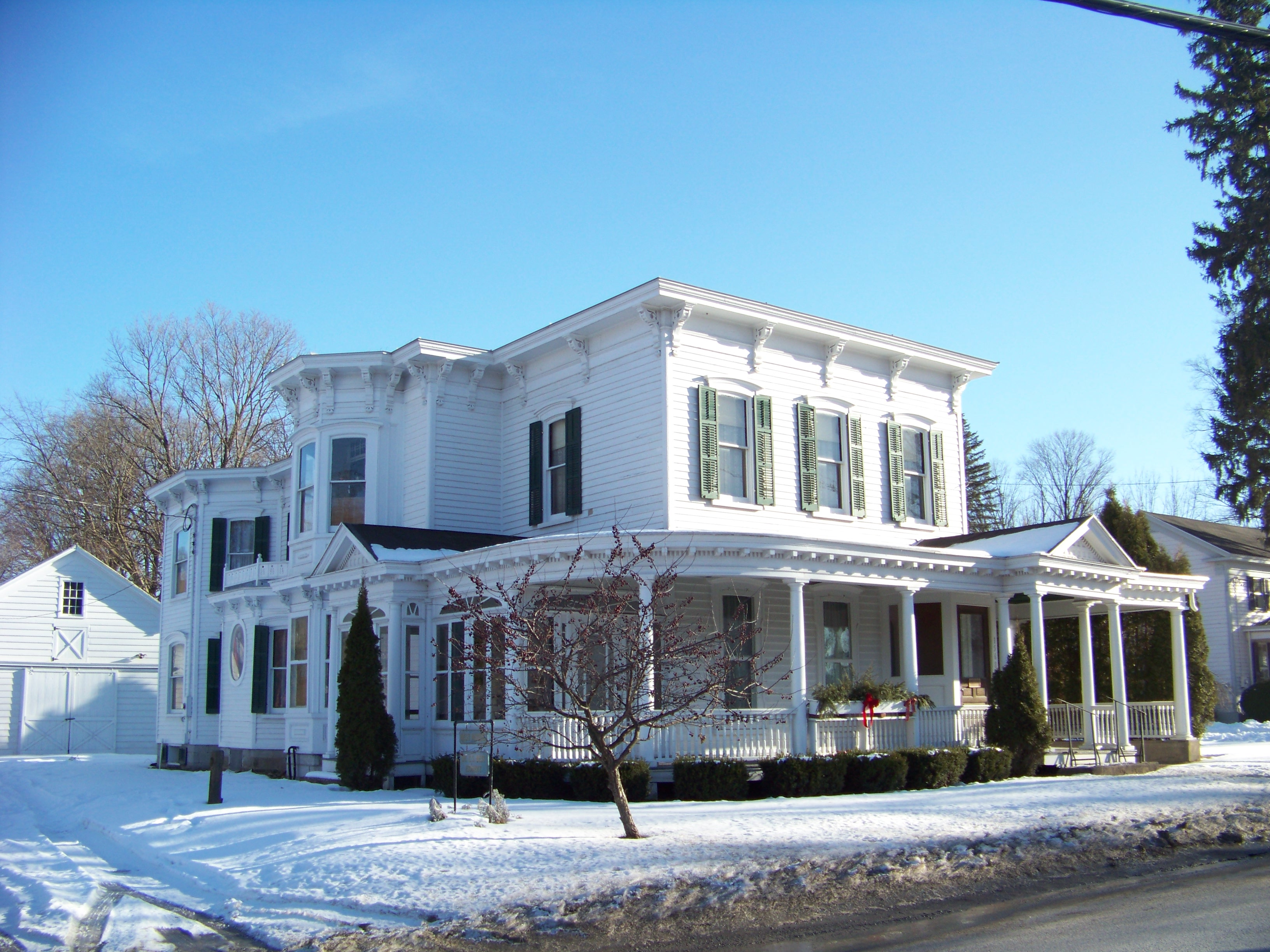

- Location within New York Location within the United States
- Interactive map showing the location of Dr. Christopher S. Best House and Office
- Location: 34 Clauverwie St., Middleburgh, New York
- Coordinates: 42°35′47″N 74°19′59″W
- Area: less than one acre
- Built: 1884
- Architect: Brazee, Jehiel
- Architectural style: Italianate
- NRHP reference No.: 01000849
- Added to NRHP: August 15, 2001

Dr. Christopher S. Best House and Office is a historic home in Middleburgh, Schoharie County, New York. It is a two-story, flat-roofed, frame Italianate dwelling built in 1884. It was enlarged and modified with a series of renovations between 1890 and 1912. It now houses a medical history museum. Also on the property are a frame carriage barn and garage.

From 1884 to 1991, a small-town American community was served by this Victorian residence and medical facility. The Dr. Best collection has Civil War, railroad and telephone artifacts. The expansive and unique collection includes bottles, automotive memorabilia, clothing and quilts, as well as the fully stocked kitchen and medical equipment. The house is open for tours during the summer.

It was listed on the National Register of Historic Places in 2001.

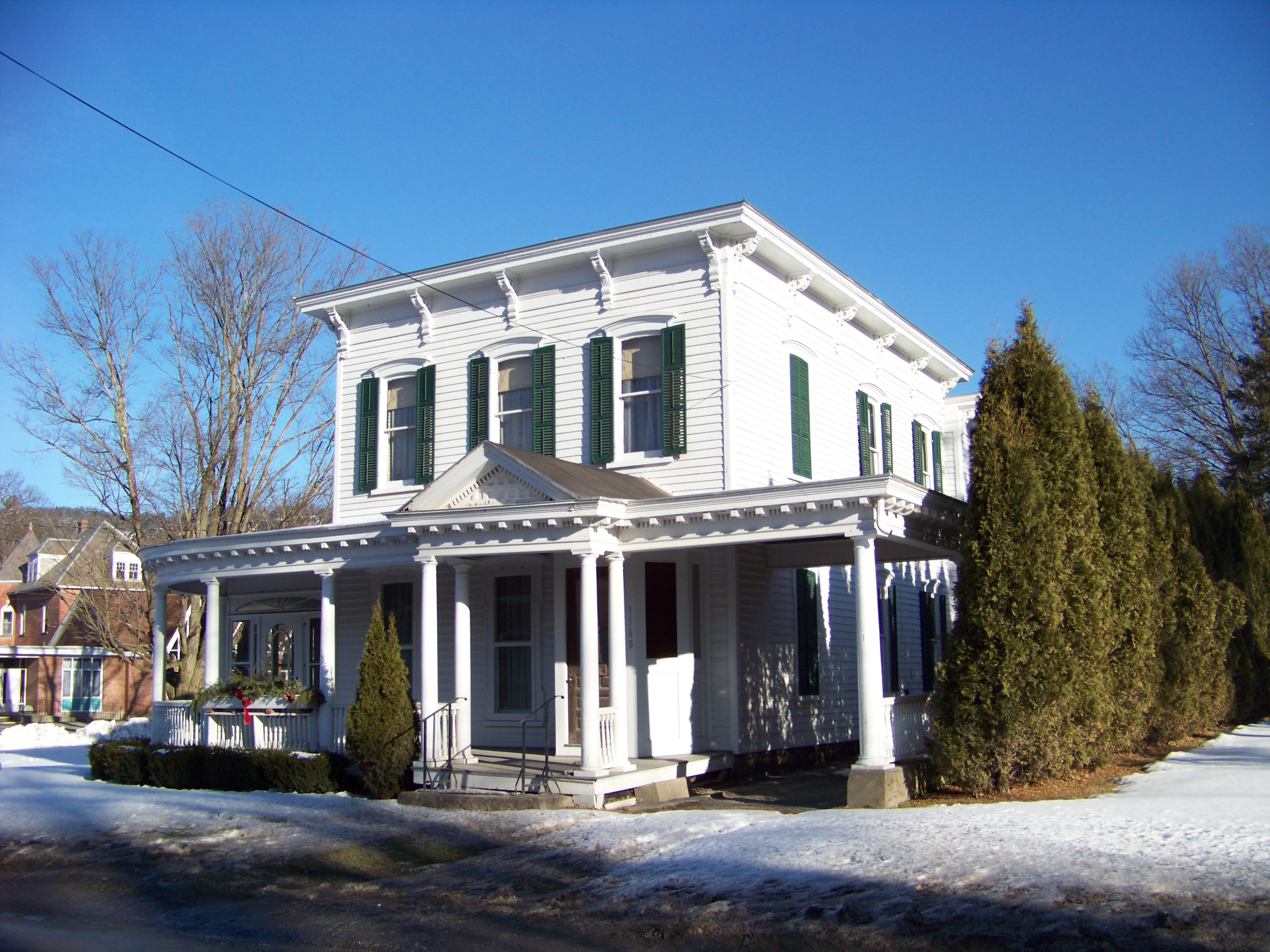
Alternate View

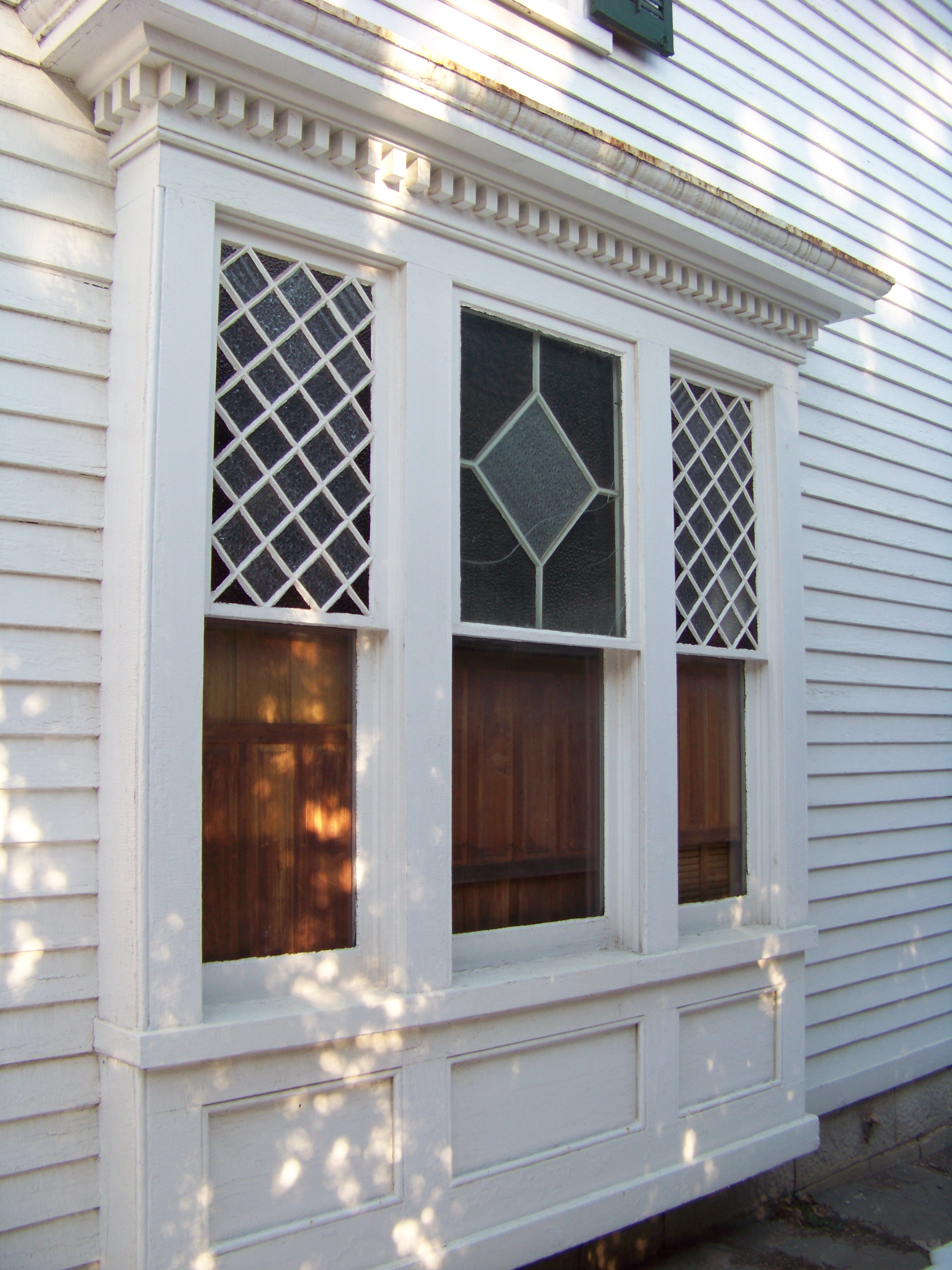
Window

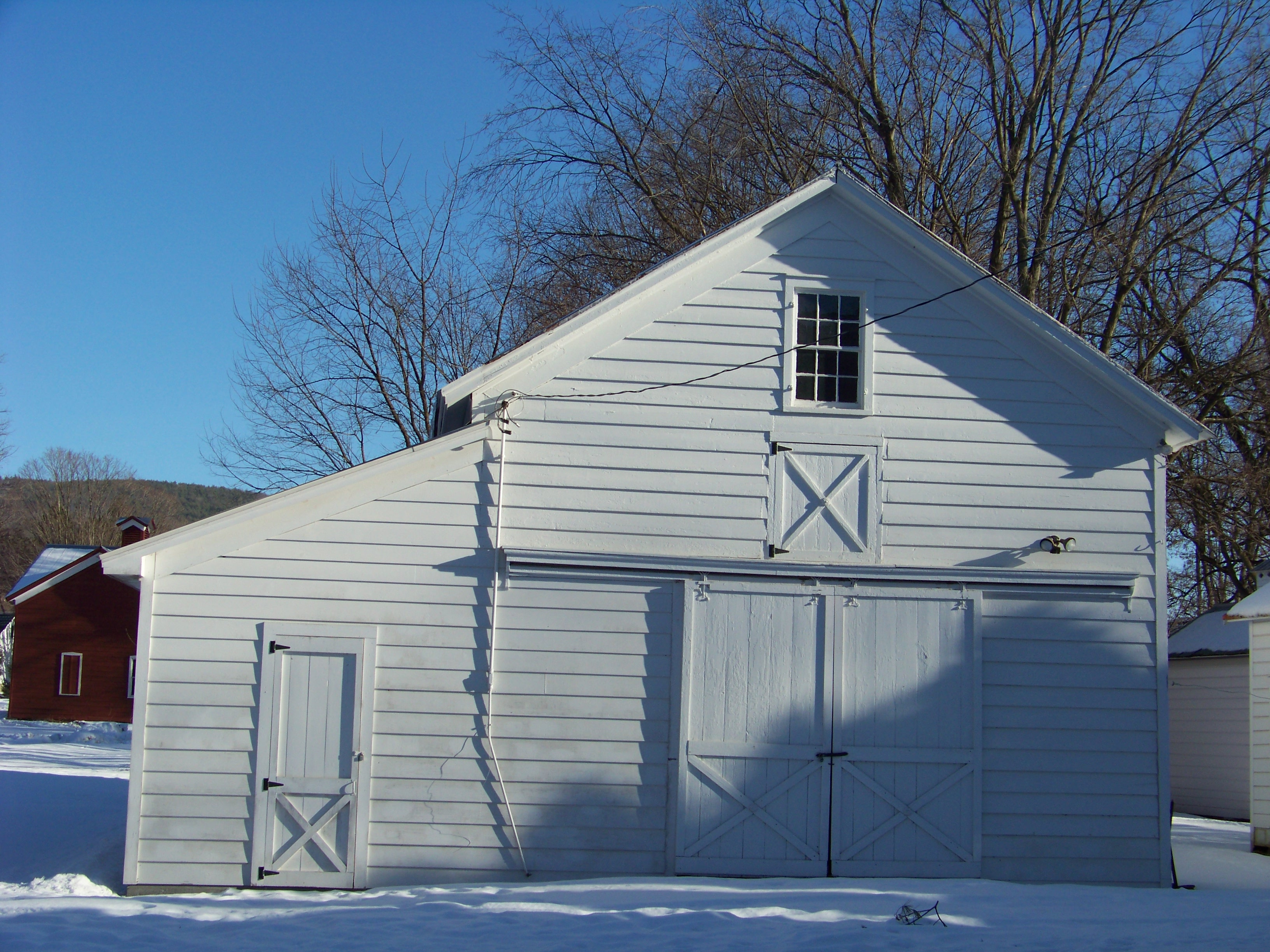
Carriage Barn

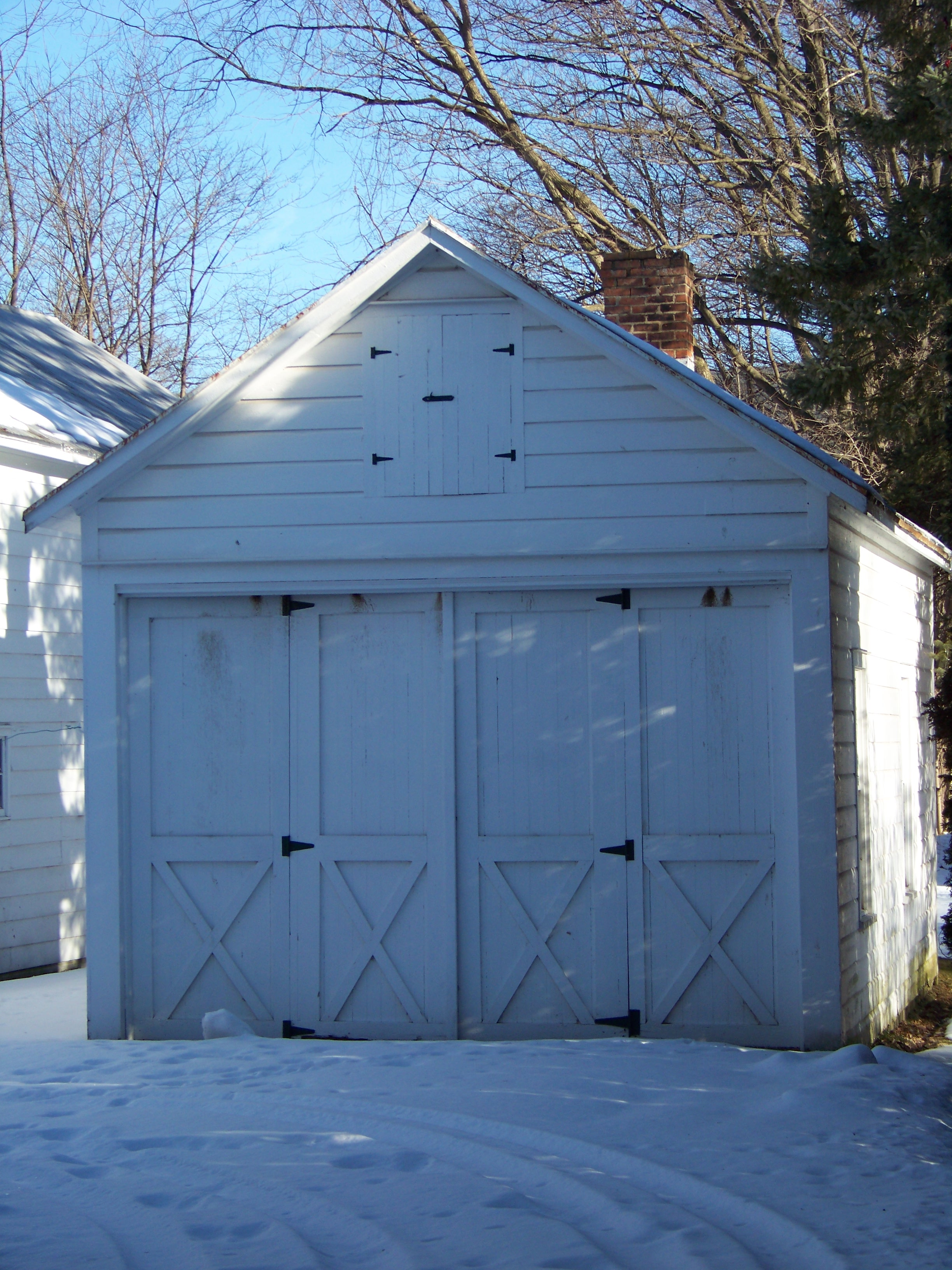
Garage
