= Dupont Circle Fountain =

Artwork by Daniel Chester French

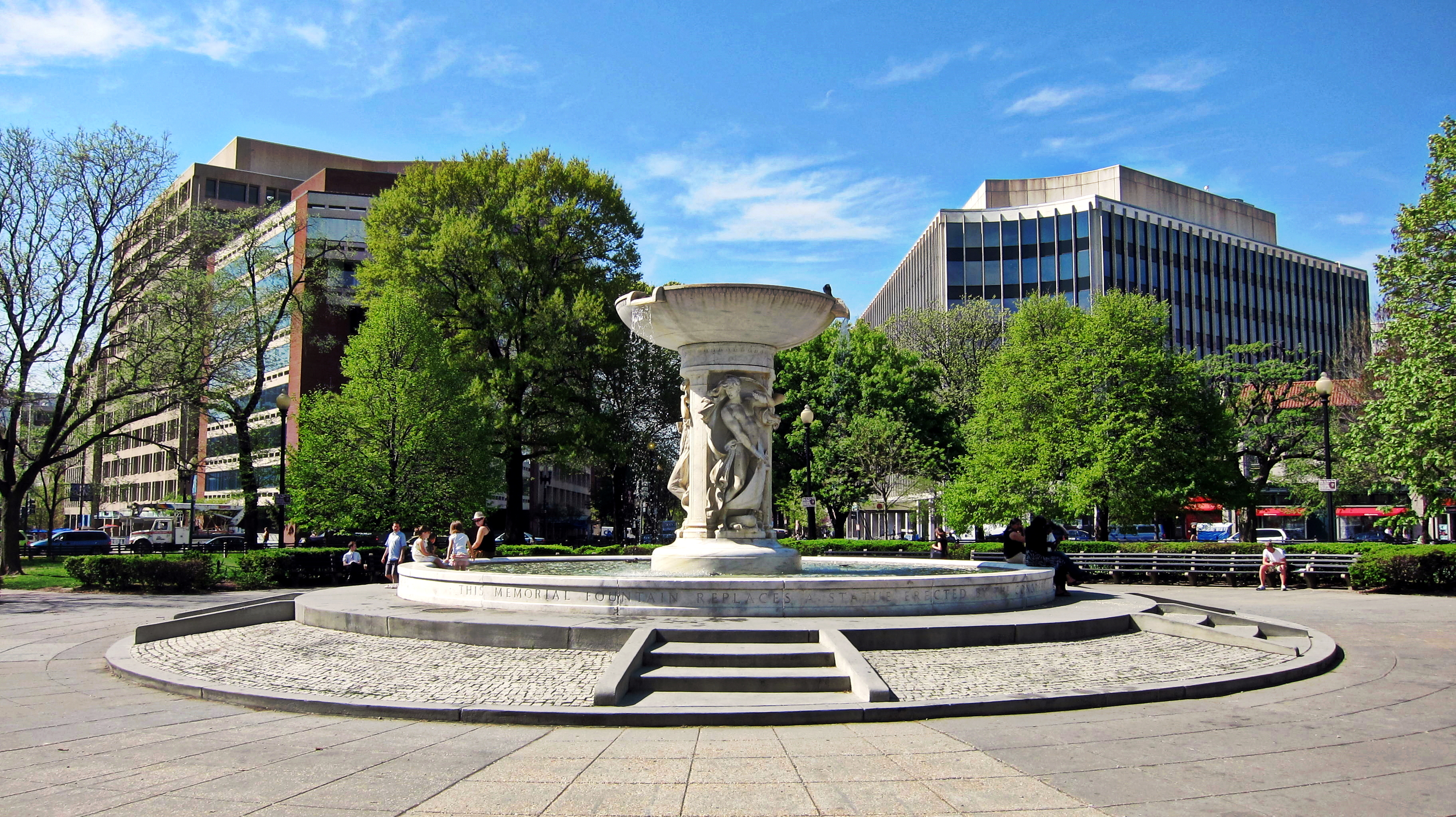
- Interactive map of Dupont Circle Fountain
- Location: Dupont Circle, Washington, D.C., United States
- Coordinates: 38.9092378°N 77.0416637°W
- Dupont Circle Fountain
- U.S. National Register of Historic Places
- U.S. Historic district – Contributing property
- Part of: Civil War Monuments in Washington, D.C.
- NRHP reference No.: 78000257
- Added to NRHP: September 20, 1978
- Designer: Daniel Chester French (sculptor); Henry Bacon (architect); Piccirilli Brothers (carver); George A. Fuller Company (contractor)
- Material: Marble; Concrete (base)
- Width: 11.6 feet (3.5 m)
- Height: 16 feet (4.9 m)
- Opening date: May 17, 1921
- Dedicated to: Samuel Francis Du Pont

The Dupont Circle Fountain, formally known as the Rear Admiral Samuel Francis Dupont Memorial Fountain, is a fountain located in the center of Dupont Circle in Washington, D.C. It honors Rear Admiral Samuel Francis Du Pont, a prominent American naval officer and member of the Du Pont family. The fountain replaced a statue of Du Pont that was installed in 1884. Designed by Henry Bacon and sculpted by Daniel Chester French, the fountain was dedicated in 1921. Prominent guests at the dedication ceremony included First Lady Florence Harding, Secretary of War John W. Weeks and Secretary of the Navy Edwin Denby.

The fountain is one of eighteen Civil War monuments collectively listed on the National Register of Historic Places in 1978. The marble fountain, which is adorned with three allegorical sculptures, rests on a concrete base and is surrounded by an open plaza. The fountain and surrounding park are owned and maintained by the National Park Service, a federal agency of the Interior Department.

== History ==
=== Background ===
In 1871, the United States Army Corps of Engineers began constructing Dupont Circle, which at the time was called Pacific Circle since it was the western boundary of the city's residential areas. On February 25, 1882, Congress renamed the circle and authorized a memorial to Samuel Francis Du Pont (1803–1865) to honor his services during the Mexican–American War and Civil War. He played a large role in the modernization of the Navy, and during the Civil War he was responsible for making the Union blockade effective against the Confederacy, though his failed attempt to attack Charleston in 1863 tarnished his career record. The bronze statue was sculpted by Launt Thompson and dedicated on December 20, 1884, at a cost of $20,500. Attendees at the ceremony included President Chester A. Arthur, Senator Thomas F. Bayard, Admiral David Dixon Porter and General Philip Sheridan. The circle was landscaped with exotic plants and hundreds of trees.

In the early 20th century, members of the prominent Du Pont family wanted a memorial of greater artistic value and lobbied for a replacement. The family had always disliked the statue and by 1909, the base of the statue had begun to sink and tilt, resulting in jokes being made that Du Pont and sailors were alcoholics. Senator Willard Saulsbury, Jr.'s wife, who was a niece of Du Pont, led efforts to replace the statue. The family asked that no government funds be used for the new memorial and that the Commission of Fine Arts (CFA) approve the design. On February 26, 1917, Congress approved the replacement of the statue and insisted on construction beginning within three years.

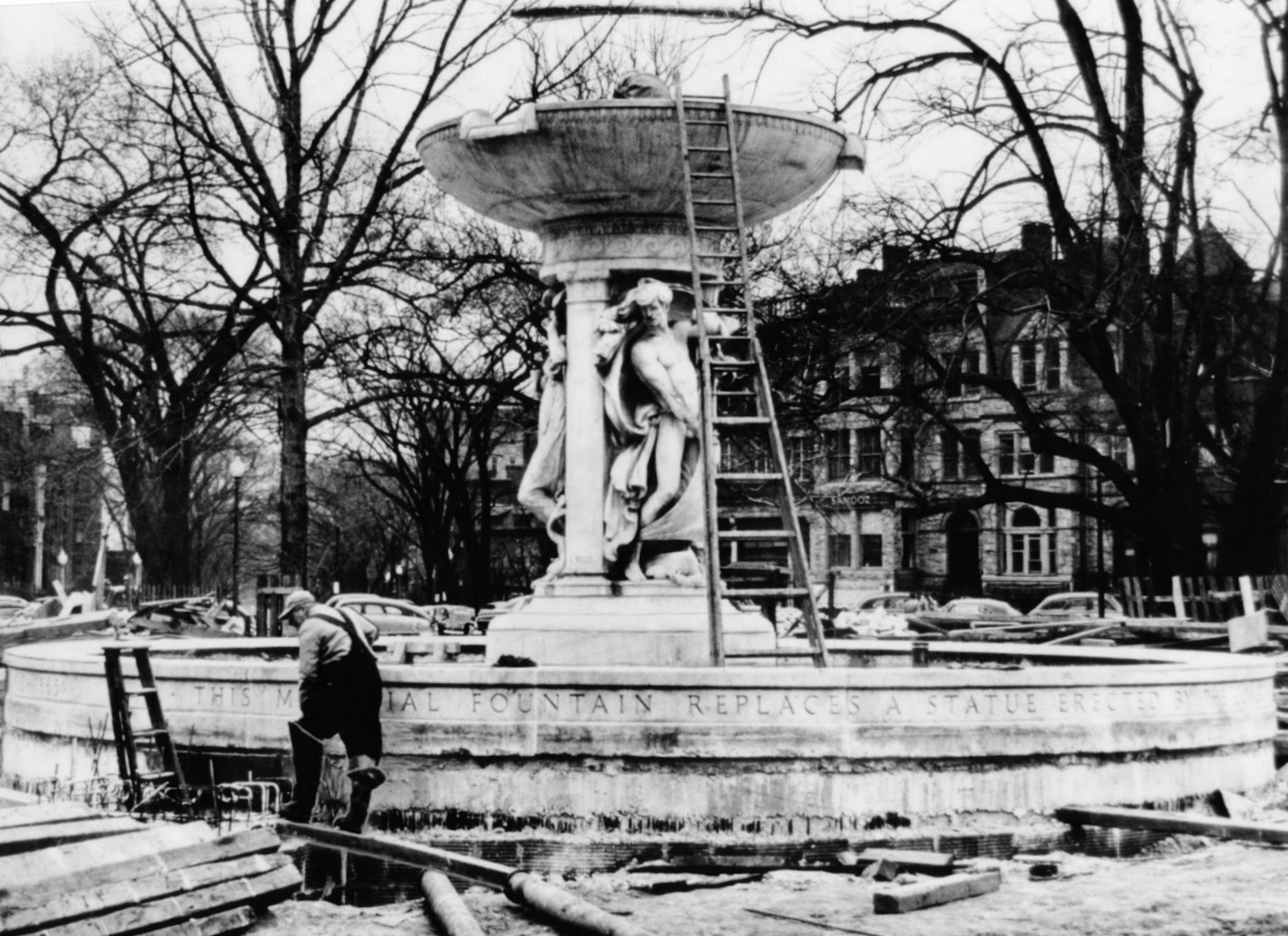
Installation of the fountain in 1920.

The Du Pont family chose architect Henry Bacon and sculptor Daniel Chester French to design a fountain that reflected the Beaux-Arts and neoclassical styles that were popular in the neighborhood at the time, such as the Patterson Mansion, located on the northeast edge of the circle. Bacon is best known for designing the Lincoln Memorial while French's best known work is the statue of Abraham Lincoln inside the memorial. French's other works in Washington, D.C., include the Butt-Millet Memorial Fountain, the First Division Monument and the Thomas Gallaudet Memorial. The total cost of the commission was $77,521. The CFA approved the design in 1917 and work began on the fountain shortly thereafter.

Congress wanted recognition for its earlier attempt to honor Du Pont, so the inscription on the fountain had to include the fact that a statue erected by Congress was replaced. An early model included plans for a fountain emitting water at the top, but this wasn't incorporated into the final design. The fountain was carved by the Piccirilli Brothers, who also carved French's statue of Abraham Lincoln at the Lincoln Memorial. The contractor was the George A. Fuller Company, whose other projects include the Flatiron Building and the Plaza Hotel in New York City. In 1920, the statue was moved to Rockford Park in Wilmington, Delaware, the hometown of the Du Pont family. Later that year, the fountain was installed using pipes that were placed in 1877 for a potential fountain that had never been built. After the installation, mature trees and thick vegetation were planted in the surrounding park.

=== Dedication ===
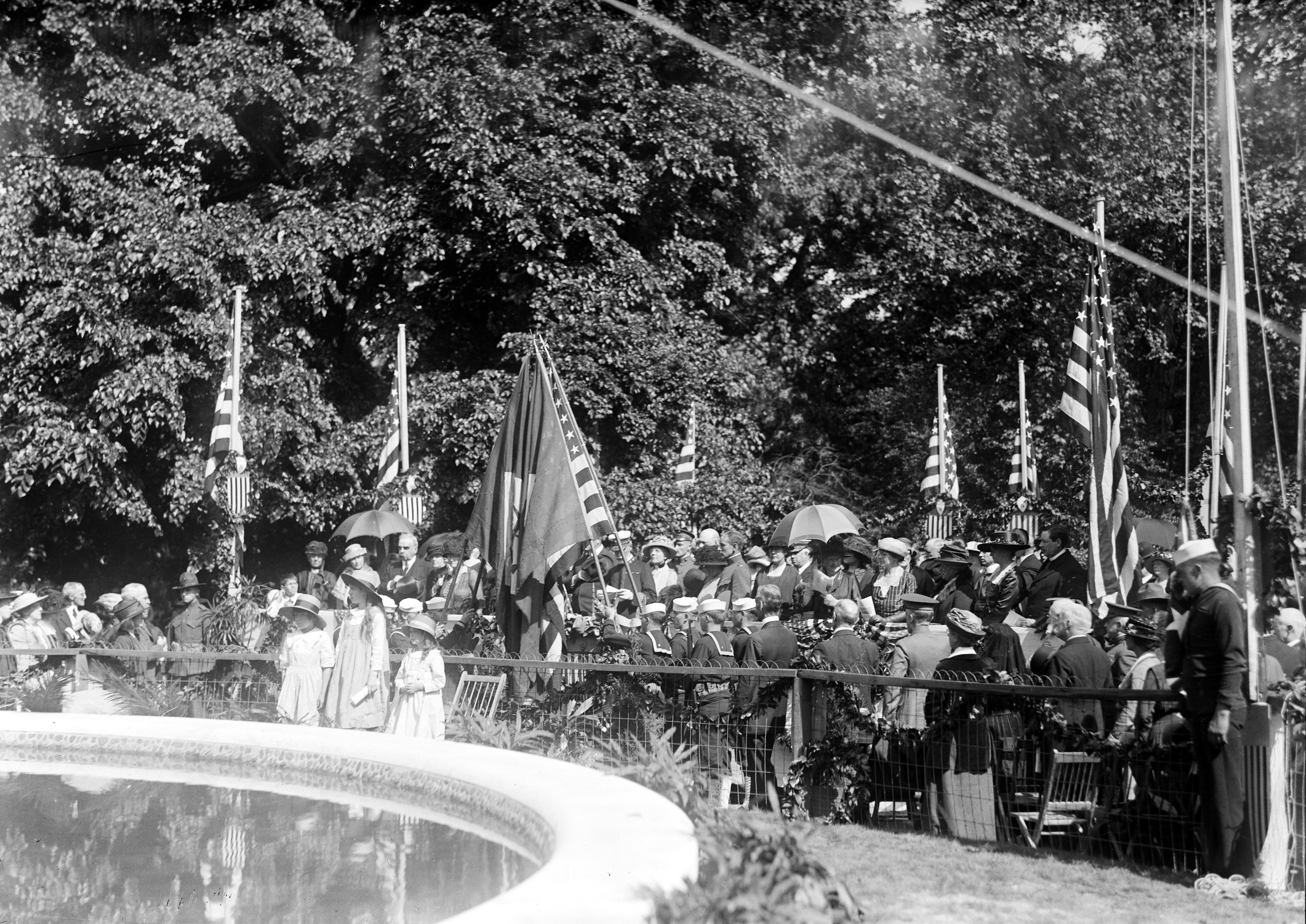
The dedication ceremony in 1921.

The fountain was formally dedicated the afternoon of May 17, 1921. The ceremony, which was supervised by Lieutenant Colonel Clarence O. Sherrill, was described as "simple, yet impressive." A temporary stand decorated with flags and shields was built for prominent guests including First Lady Florence Harding, Secretary of War John W. Weeks and Secretary of the Navy Edwin Denby. Chairs were placed along the walkways surrounding the fountain and sailors served as ushers for the event. While invited guests were being seated, the Navy Band performed music. Following the concert, members of the public were allowed to enter the area and soon filled the surrounding park.

The invocation was given by Episcopal bishop Alfred Harding followed by presentation of the colors while the band performed "The Stars and Stripes Forever". The cloth screens concealing the fountain were then removed by Du Pont's granddaughter, Sophie Du Pont Ford, and the band performed the national anthem and "Narcissus" by Ethelbert Nevin. The fountain was formally presented by Rear Admiral Purnell Frederick Harrington, who had served alongside Du Pont. Weeks received the fountain as a gift from the Du Pont family on behalf of the government. A speech was then given by Denby who praised Du Pont's services to his country. He stated: "Du Pont's hereditary background had justified the hope so meritoriously fulfilled in that officer's career, while his service as a midshipman on the then active Constitution must have proved an inspiration for his later activities." Denby also praised Du Pont's attitude toward his fellow sailors and his willingness to put the country's needs above his own. He concluded his speech by noting how proud the Navy was of the new memorial and expressed hopes that it would always be well maintained. Following Denby's speech, three young girls that were descendants of du Pont, Ann Andrews, Emily Du Pont and Mary Harvey, placed laurel wreaths in the fountain water. The ceremony concluded with the band performing "Columbia, the Gem of the Ocean."

=== Later history ===
The fountain was a frequent target for vandals who would repeatedly break off fingers or hands from the sculptures. New hands were later carved and attached to the sculptures. In 1948, the fountain was temporarily removed when a streetcar underpass was built beneath Dupont Circle. When it was moved back to its original location two years later, the fountain's pumping system was replaced. When the new system was installed, workers forgot to connect the pipes to the fountain. The issue was corrected the following year and the fountain became operational.

The fountain is one of eighteen Civil War monuments in Washington, D.C. that were collectively listed on the National Register of Historic Places (NRHP) on September 20, 1978, and the District of Columbia Inventory of Historic Sites on March 3, 1979. It is one of the few Civil War monuments that is a not an equestrian sculpture. The others are the Stephenson Grand Army of the Republic Memorial, Nuns of the Battlefield, the Peace Monument, and statues of Admiral David G. Farragut, Albert Pike and General John A. Rawlins. The fountain is designated a contributing property to the Massachusetts Avenue Historic District, listed on the NRHP on October 22, 1974, and the Dupont Circle Historic District, listed on the NRHP on July 21, 1978. In the late 1990s, the fountain was restored by sculptor Constantine Seferlis. The fountain and surrounding park are owned and maintained by the National Park Service, a federal agency of the Interior Department.

== Design and location ==
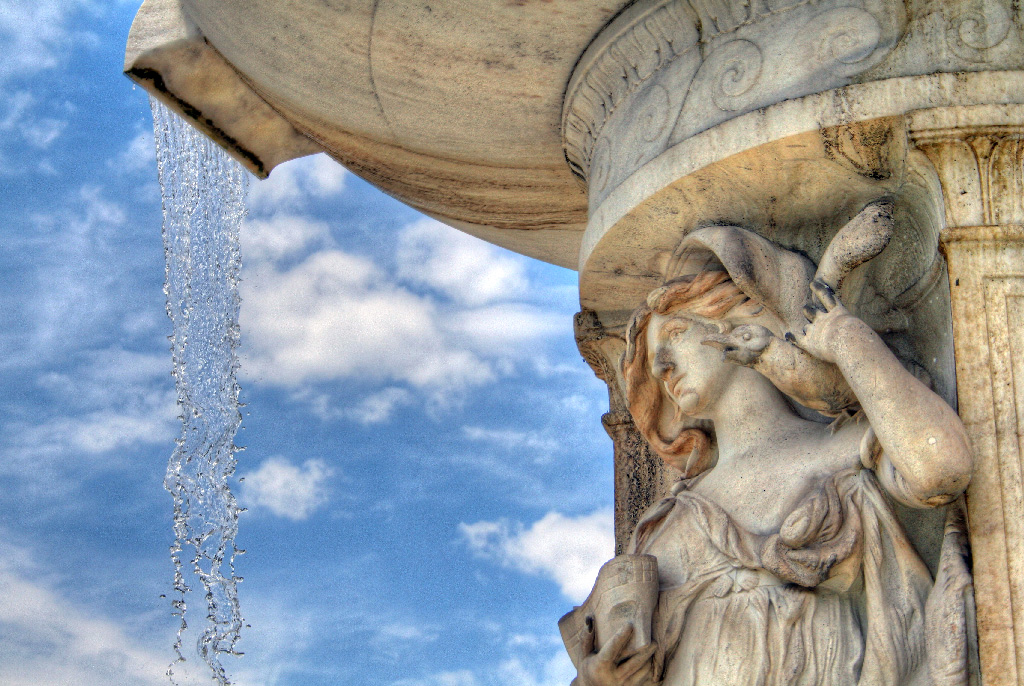
Water falling over the figure representing the Sea.

The fountain sits in the center of Dupont Circle, a park, traffic circle and neighborhood in the northwest quadrant of Washington, D.C. The park is located at the convergence of 19th Street, P Street, Connecticut Avenue, Massachusetts Avenue and New Hampshire Avenue NW.

The double-tiered, white marble fountain rests on a concrete base. The upper basin of the fountain, which is approximately 3 feet (0.91 m) high and 11.6 feet (3.5 m) wide and weighs 15 tons, is supported by an 8-ton shaft adorned with three allegorical figures, the Arts of Ocean Navigation. The figures, which are approximately 8 feet (2.4 m) tall and 4.5 feet (1.4 m) wide and weigh 12 tons, represent the Sea, the Stars and the Wind. The Sea is represented by a female figure with long hair holding a boat in her right hand while caressing a seagull on her shoulder with her left hand. Her left foot rests on a dolphin. The Stars is a nude female figure with long hair holding a globe in her left hand and is faced downward. The Wind is a nude male figure draped with a ship sail. He is holding a conch shell with his left hand to use as a horn and is facing right. The water pours over the upper basin into a large lower basin that is approximately 1.8 feet (0.55 m) tall. The inscription on the outer rim of the lower basin states: "THIS MEMORIAL FOUNTAIN REPLACES A STATUE ERECTED BY THE CONGRESS OF THE UNITED STATES IN RECOGNITION OF HIS DISTINGUISHED SERVICES. SAMUEL FRANCIS DUPONT UNITED STATES NAVY 1803 – 1865." The circular concrete base features four sets of three steps that lead to the surrounding plaza. Six radial paths corresponding to the surrounding streets lead from the plaza to the edges of the park.

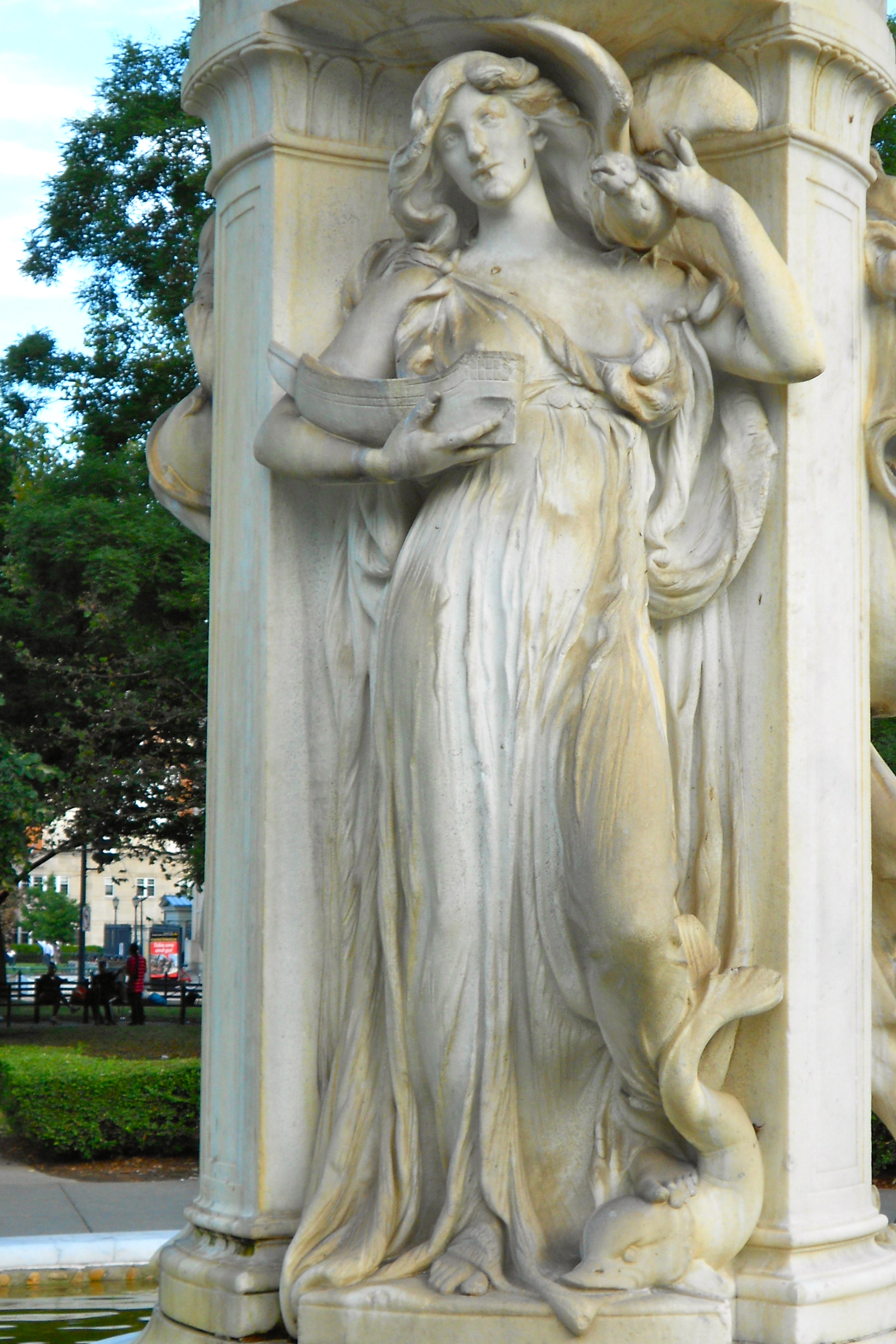
Sea

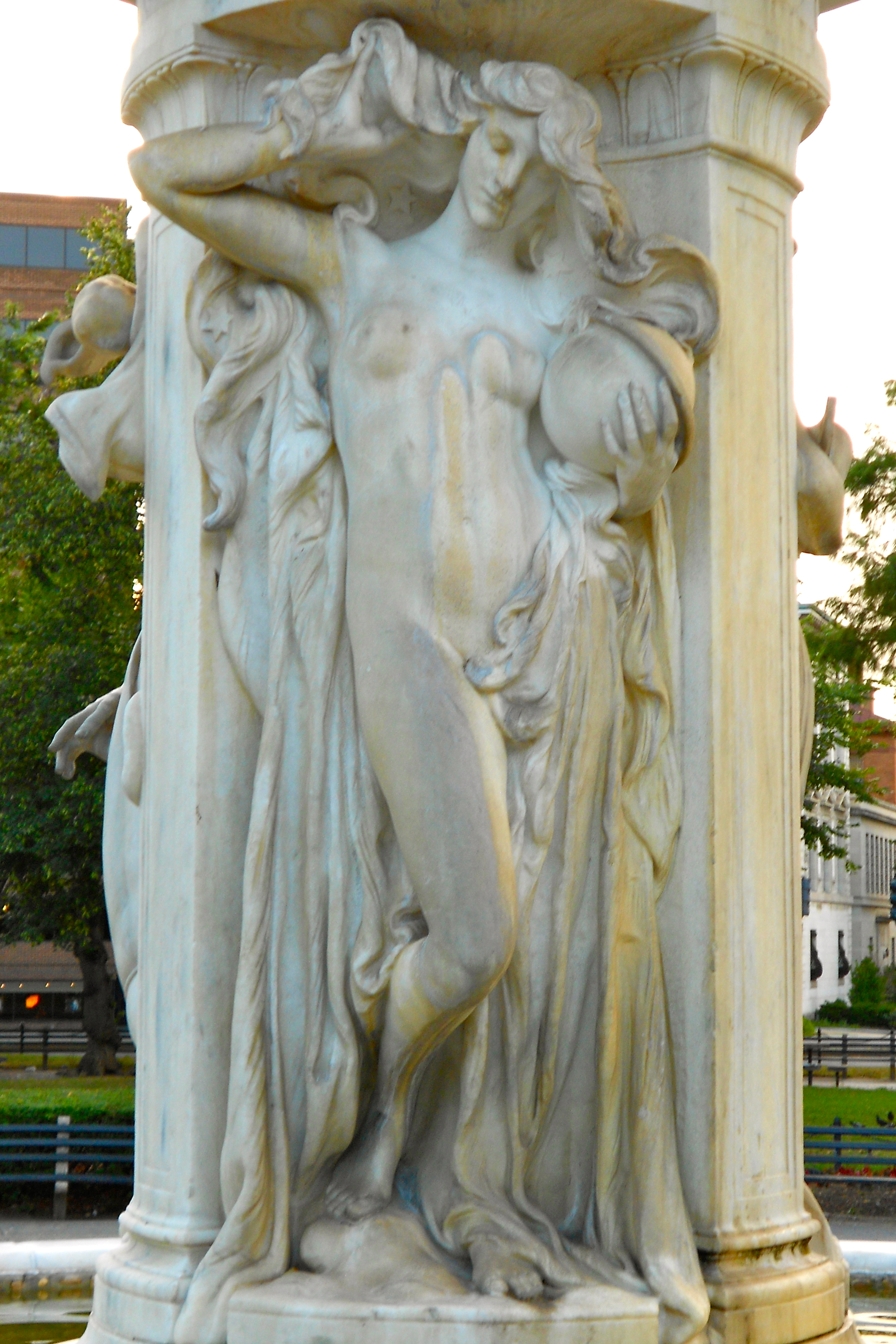
Stars

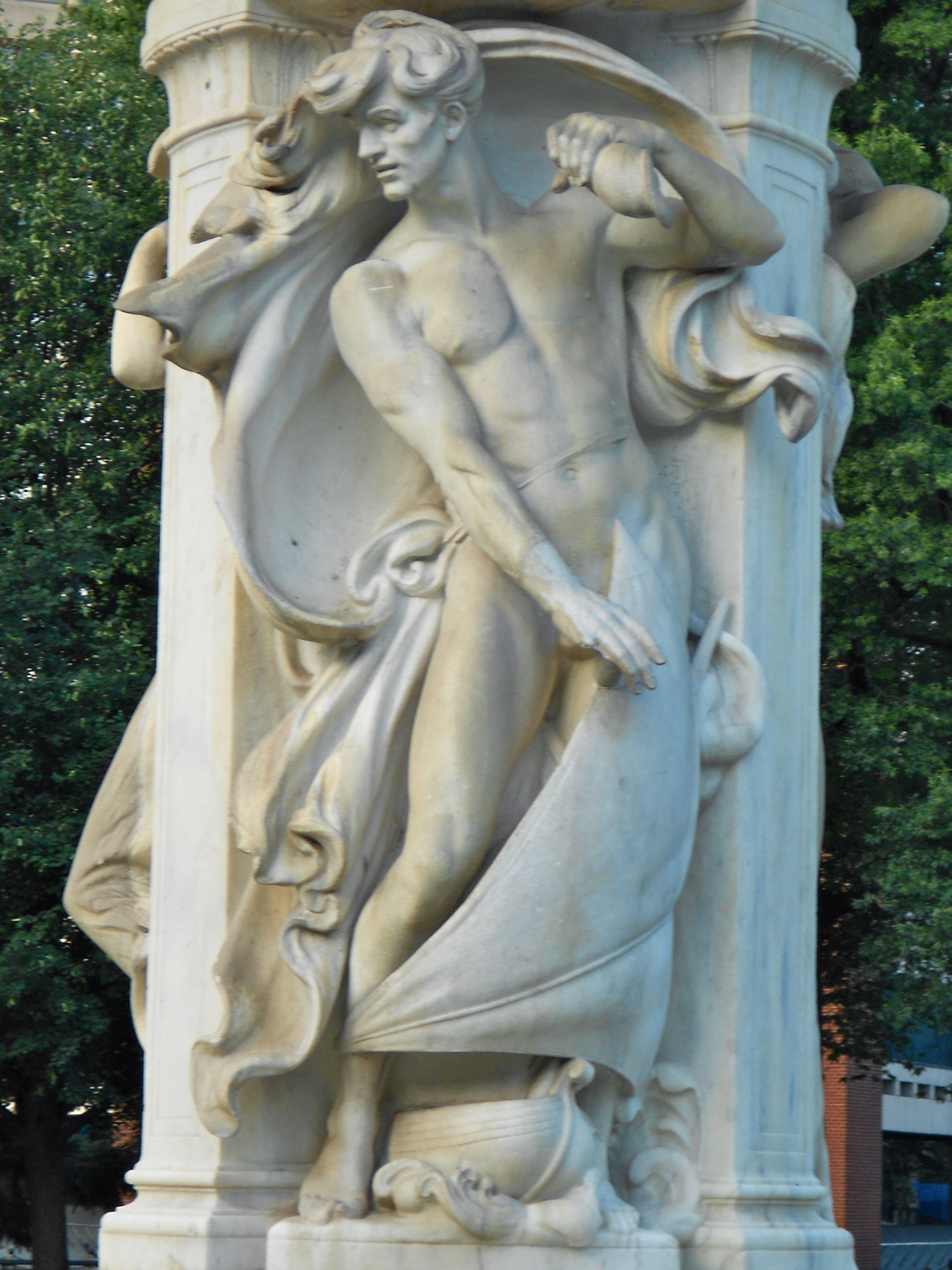
Wind

== See also ==
- List of public art in Washington, D.C., Ward 2
- Outdoor sculpture in Washington, D.C.
- Public sculptures by Daniel Chester French
