= Upper Middleburgh Cemetery =

Historic cemetery in New York, United States

- U.S. National Register of Historic Places
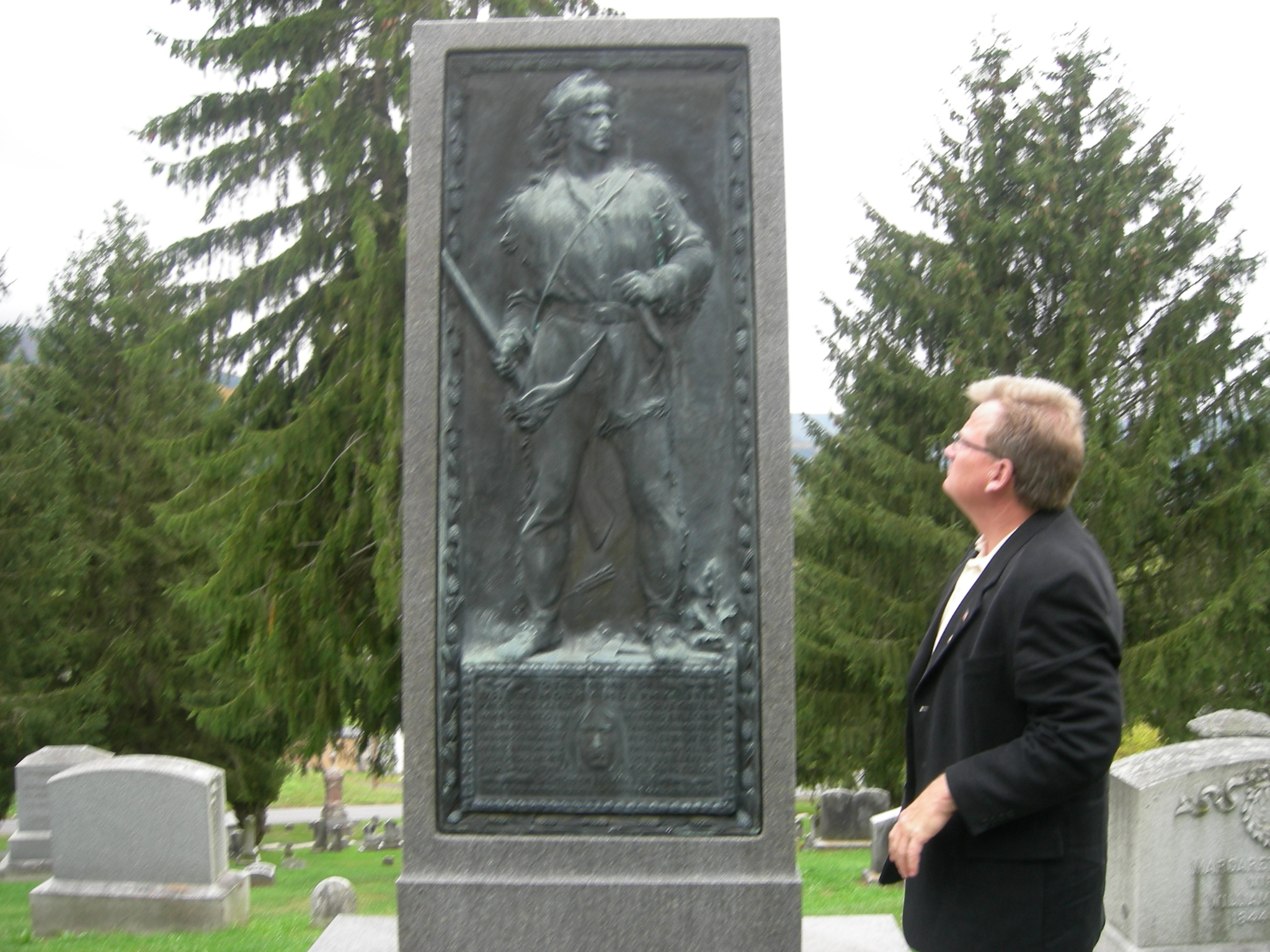
- Timothy Murphy Memorial Monument

- Location within New York Location within the United States
- Location: Huntersland Rd., Middleburgh, New York
- Coordinates: 42°35′24″N 74°19′8″W
- Area: 16 acres (6.5 ha)
- Built: 1865
- NRHP reference No.: 03001144
- Added to NRHP: November 17, 2003

Upper Middleburgh Cemetery is a historic cemetery located in Middleburgh of Schoharie County, New York. It was incorporated in 1865 and contains an estimated 4,000 interments. The most notable structure is the Foster mausoleum, designed by architect Henry Bacon (1866–1924) in the early 1900s and includes a sculpture by Evelyn Beatrice Longman (1874–1954). There is also a Neo-Gothic Revival chapel (ca. 1925), maintenance and storage building (ca. 1880), and Timothy Murphy memorial, dedicated in 1910 and including a bronze bas-relief sculpture by Evelyn Beatrice Longman.

It was listed on the National Register of Historic Places in 2003.
