= Bellinger–Dutton House =

Historic house in New York, United States

- U.S. National Register of Historic Places
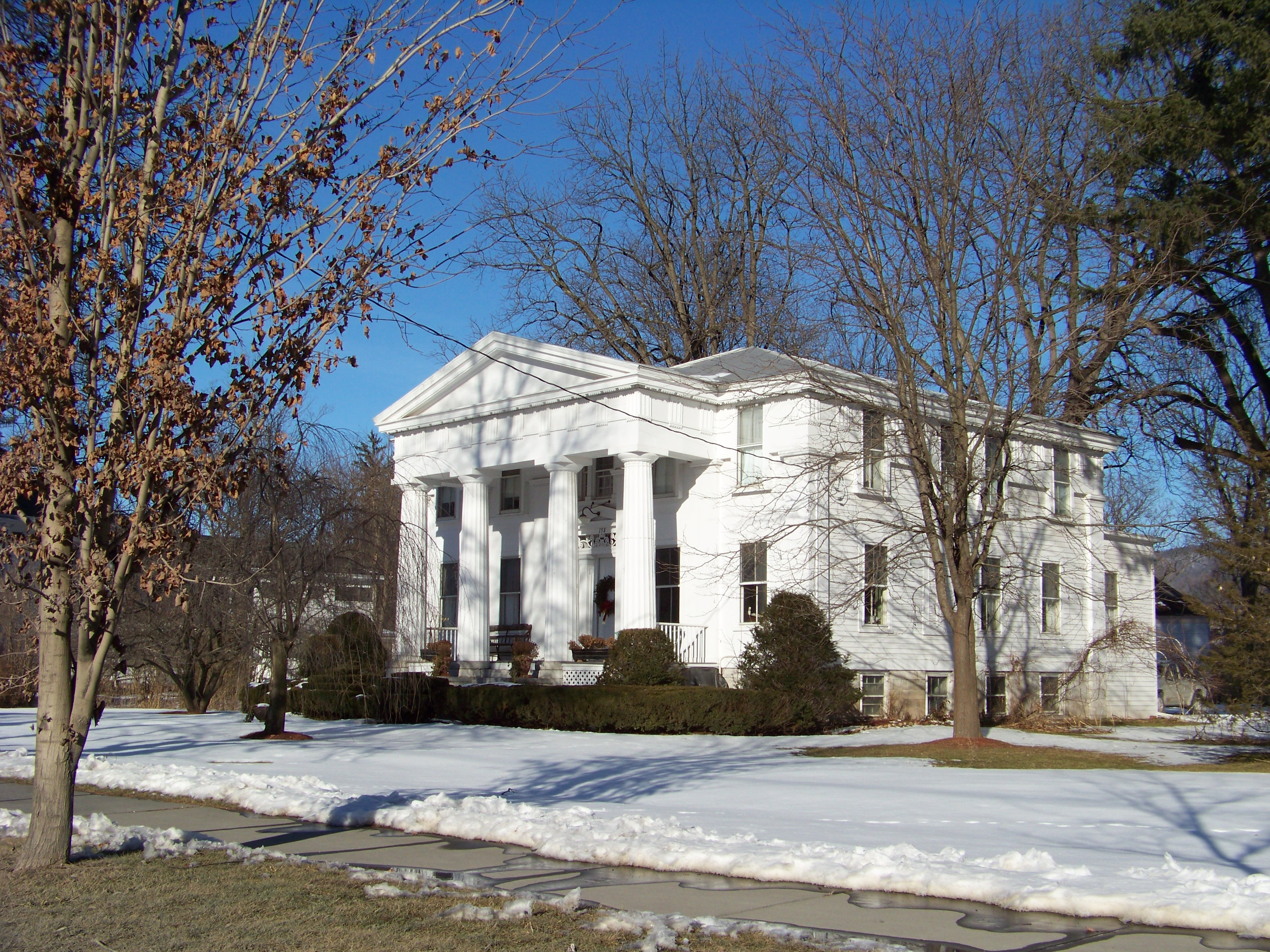
- Bellinger–Dutton House, January 2010

- Location within New York Location within the United States
- Location: 158 River St. (NY 30), Middleburgh, New York
- Coordinates: 42°36′15″N 74°20′13″W
- Area: 4.5 acres (1.8 ha)
- Built: 1846
- Architectural style: Greek Revival
- NRHP reference No.: 05001380
- Added to NRHP: December 7, 2005

The Bellinger–Dutton House is a historic house located at 158 River Street in Middleburgh, Schoharie County, New York.

== Description and history ==
It is a two-story, heavy timber-framed structure built in 1846 in the temple front Greek Revival style. It features a hipped roof and a massive Classical portico with four fluted Doric order columns. Also on the property are a frame carriage barn, garden house/playhouse, and square brick smokehouse.

It was listed on the National Register of Historic Places on December 7, 2005.
