= Middleburgh (village), New York =

Middleburgh, New York
- Village
- Location within the state of New York
- Coordinates: 42°35′48″N 74°19′51″W
- Country: United States
- State: New York
- County: Schoharie

Government
  - Mayor: Timothy Knight

Area
  - Total: 1.25 sq mi (3.23 km^{2})
  - Land: 1.25 sq mi (3.23 km^{2})
  - Water: 0 sq mi (0.00 km^{2})
- Elevation: 640 ft (195 m)

Population (2020)
  - Total: 1,131
  - Density: 907/sq mi (350.1/km^{2})
- Time zone: UTC-5 (Eastern (EST))
  - Summer (DST): UTC-4 (EDT)
- ZIP code: 12122
- Area code: 518
- FIPS code: 36-46866
- GNIS feature ID: 0957144
- Website: www.schohariecounty-ny.gov/CountyWebSite/villmid/index.jsp

Middleburgh is a village in Schoharie County, New York, United States. The population was 1,131 at the 2020 census. The Village of Middleburgh is in the southwestern part of the Town of Middleburgh and is west of Albany.

== History ==
The village is the site where the town was first settled around 1712–1713. Initially known as Weiser's Dorf, the first Palatine settlement in the Schoharie Valley was established by Johan Conrad Weiser in what is now the Village of Middleburgh. This settlement eventually came to be named after Middelburg, the capital of Zeeland, one of the provinces of the then-Dutch Republic and the current Netherlands. The village was incorporated in 1881.

"Middleburg" and "Middleburgh" have been used interchangeably in the past, as seen on old maps of the area. In the early 1980s the final "H" was added to road signs outside the village. In 2004, the Post Office finally added the "H".

The historic Middleburgh-Schoharie Railroad was half-based in the village. The Bellinger-Dutton House, Dr. Christopher S. Best House and Office, St. Mark's Evangelical Lutheran Church, United States Post Office-Middleburgh, and Upper Middleburgh Cemetery are listed on the National Register of Historic Places.

The Village of Middleburgh was devastated in 2011 by the effects of Hurricane Irene. However, due to a massive volunteer effort led and organized by local residents, the community was able to successfully recover and rebuild.

== Geography ==
Middleburgh is located at 42°35′47″N 74°19′51″W (42.596627, -74.330922).

According to the United States Census Bureau, the village has a total area of 1.2 square miles (3.1 km^{2}), all land.

The Schoharie Creek passes the village, where it is joined by the Little Schoharie Creek and Stony Creek.

New York State Route 30 (River Street) and New York State Route 145 (Main Street) intersect in the village at the bridge over Schoharie Creek.

== Demographics ==
Historical population
Census	Pop.	Note	%±
1870	863		—
1880	1,123		30.1%
1890	1,139		1.4%
1900	1,135		−0.4%
1910	1,114		−1.9%
1920	986		−11.5%
1930	948		−3.9%
1940	1,074		13.3%
1950	1,298		20.9%
1960	1,317		1.5%
1970	1,410		7.1%
1980	1,358		−3.7%
1990	1,436		5.7%
2000	1,398		−2.6%
2010	1,500		7.3%
2020	1,131		−24.6%
U.S. Decennial Census

As of the census of 2000, there were 1,398 people, 595 households, and 371 families residing in the village. The population density was 1,163.6 inhabitants per square mile (449.3/km^{2}). There were 667 housing units at an average density of 555.2 units per square mile (214.4 units/km^{2}). The racial makeup of the village was 96.78% White, 0.29% Black or African American, 0.72% Native American, 0.21% Asian, 1.07% from other races, and 0.93% from two or more races. Hispanic or Latino of any race were 2.65% of the population.

There were 595 households, out of which 28.6% had children under the age of 18 living with them, 46.6% were married couples living together, 11.4% had a female householder with no husband present, and 37.6% were non-families. 34.3% of all households were made up of individuals, and 16.8% had someone living alone who was 65 years of age or older. The average household size was 2.33 and the average family size was 2.98.

In the village, the population was spread out, with 25.3% under the age of 18, 6.4% from 18 to 24, 26.7% from 25 to 44, 23.3% from 45 to 64, and 18.4% who were 65 years of age or older. The median age was 39 years. For every 100 females, there were 89.7 males. For every 100 females age 18 and over, there were 83.7 males.

The median income for a household in the village was $30,583, and the median income for a family was $44,286. Males had a median income of $31,438 versus $25,313 for females. The per capita income for the village was $17,948. About 12.2% of families and 17.8% of the population were below the poverty line, including 27.9% of those under age 18 and 10.8% of those age 65 or over.

== Politics ==
Middleburgh is one of the more prominent villages within Schoharie County and has a Village Board consisting of four trustees and a mayor. Currently the Trustees and the Mayor serve four-year terms. Before 1985 the terms were two years, but a local law changed this. The 2020 general election took place in September, delayed from its original March schedule due to the Coronavirus pandemic.

- Mayor:

--Timothy Knight, of Cliff Street, was appointed to the Village Board during the COVID-19 lockdown in March 2020 to fill retiring Trustee Bill Morton's seat. Knight was elected to a full-term on September 15, 2020, along with former Mayor Bergan and Trustee Tinker. He is the appointed Deputy Mayor and is currently serving as Acting Mayor after the resignation of Bergan in late April 2023. He was elected to a full-term as Village Mayor in the November 2023 Election, defeating former Mayor Gary Hayes.

- Trustees:

– Robert Tinker, of Indian Acres, elected with 52% of the vote in 2012. Re-elected with 49% of the vote in 2016. Re-elected in 2020 with 51% of the vote. The longest serving member on the Board, he was re-elected to a fourth term in 2023 with 43.2% of the vote.

– Sheryl Adams, of Upper Main Street, appointed to the Village Board in 2012 to fill former Trustee Avitabile's seat. Won re-election for the remainder of the seat's term in 2013 defeating former Mayoral candidate John Shaw Jr. Successfully gained a four-year term in 2014 with 49% of the vote and was re-elected in both 2018 and 2021.

– Amanda Fernandez, of Main Street, was appointed to the Village Board in October 2022 after former Trustee Shane Foland resigned one year into a four-year term. Fernandez, running unopposed, was elected to serve out the remaining two-years of the term in the 2023 Election with 99.7% of the vote.

– Kevin Young, of Railroad Avenue, was elected with 34.5% of the vote in the 2023 Election. Previously a member of the Middleburgh Planning Board, Mr. Young ran on a joint ticket with Mr. Tinker, defeating their opponent David Jeremenko by a two-to-one margin in the first contested Trustee election in 13 years.

- Former Officials:

– Matthew Avitabile, of Maple Avenue defeated incumbent William Ansel-McCabe with 53% of the vote in the 2012 Mayoral Election. Avitabile was a Village Trustee for five years before the 2012 election. Re-elected over write-in candidate Ansel-McCabe with 90% of the vote in 2016. Avitabile resigned as Mayor at the end of his legal term, extended by two weeks by Governor Cuomo's executive order due to Coronavirus in the spring of 2020, and was subsequently reappointed to the Middleburgh Village Board as a Village Trustee. Avitabile's tenure in local government ended in March 2021 with Trustees honoring him with a "Matthew Avitabile Day."

=== 2016 ===
Incumbent Mayor Matthew Avitabile announced his intention to seek a second term with Trustees Morton and Tinker. Former Mayor William Ansel-McCabe briefly entered the race but did not submit a petition to receive a place on the ballot but supporters fielded a write in campaign. Mayor Avitabile was elected with 90% of the vote and Trustees Tinker and Morton received a total of 98% combined.

=== 2014 ===
Deputy Mayor Thomas Gruning declined to run for a second term. Incumbent Sheryl Adams was joined by newcomer Lillian Bruno of Grove Street. Both ran under the Middleburgh First Party, which won its fourth straight election. In March, Bruno won 44 votes, Adams 43 and were elected to four-year terms.

=== 2013 ===
In November 2012, former Mayor Gary Hayes submitted a petition to dissolve the 132-year-old Village. He cited excess cost and the "apex" the Village and Town has reached in consolidation. Citing New York State's Article 19, which expired in 2010, his petition contained over 140 names.

The question of dissolution went to a vote on February 19, 2013. The voters rejected Mr. Hayes' proposal 344–71.

In March, Trustee Sheryl Adams, appointed to fill Mayor Matthew Avitabile's unexpired term, won a one-year term to the board of trustees.

=== 2012 ===
In March 2012 incumbent Mayor Ansel-McCabe of the "Phoenix" party was defeated by Trustee Matthew Avitabile of the "Middleburgh First" party 53-46%. Thomas Wargo of the "Direct Democracy" party of Scribner Avenue received 1% of the vote.

=== 2010 ===
Trustee Avitabile and Trustee Bonnie Ingraham's seats were up for election. Trustee Ingraham announced that she would not seek re-election. Running for these two seats are Avitabile, Dr. Thomas Gruning of Grove Street and Paul Hayes of MT Path who had previously run in 1996. Elections were held on March 16.

Avitabile and Gruning were running jointly under the "Middleburgh First" party while Mr. Hayes was under the "New Beginning" party. His brother, former Mayor Gary Hayes, decided not to run.

The "Middleburgh First" Party received 88% of the vote while the "New Beginning" received 12%. Turnout was very high despite being an off-year election.

=== 2008 ===
Mayor William Ansel-McCabe won re-election over Assistant Fire Chief John Shaw in the top race that year. McCabe received several fewer votes than in 2004 and caucused with Trustees Bowman and Ingraham.

Trustee Gerald Bowman and Charles "Butch" Ingraham won re-election in a surprisingly tight race against political newcomer Andrew Adams. Adams came up short against the two incumbents in the three-way race. Ingraham's wife Bonnie was elected to a two-year term running unopposed.

=== Recent Elections ===
Italics denote incumbent

Race	Date	Candidate	Candidate	Candidate	Turnout		
2025 Trustee Race, Two Openings (Four Years)	November 4, 2025	Sheryl Adams 196 (51%)	Amanda Fernandez 183 (47.7%)	Write-ins 5 (1.3%)	384		
2023 Mayor's Race	November 7, 2023	Timothy Knight 220 (54.2%)	Gary Hayes 185 (45.6%)	Write-ins 1 (Pete Coppolo) (0.2%)	406		
2023 Trustee Race, Two Openings (Four Years)	November 7, 2023	Robert Tinker 265 (43.7%)	Kevin Young 206 (33.9%)	David Jeremenko 130 (21.4%)	607	Write-ins 6 (1%)	
2023 Trustee Race, One Opening (Two Years)	November 7, 2023	Amanda Fernandez 307 (99.7%)	Write-ins 1 (0.3%)		308		
2021 Trustee Race, Two Openings (Four Years)	November 2, 2021	Shane Foland 206 (51.63%)	Sheryl Adams 183 (45.86%)	Write-ins 10 (2.51%)	399		
Proposition #1 (Moving Village Election Day to November)	March 16, 2021	Yes 50 (96%)	No 2 (4%)		52		
2021 Trustee Race, One Opening (Eight Months)	March 16, 2021	Shane Foland 46 (94%)	Kevin Young 3 (write-in) (6%)		49		
2020 Mayor's Race	September 15, 2020	Trish Bergan 92 (95%)	Gary Hayes 2 (write-in) (2%)	Other write-ins 3 (3%)	97		
2020 Trustee Race, Two Openings (Four Year)	September 15, 2020	Robert Tinker 91 (51%)	Timothy Knight 86 (48%)	Thomas Gruning (write-in) 1 (1%)	194		
2016 Mayor's Race	March 15, 2016	Matthew Avitabile 127 (90%)	William Ansel-McCabe 7 (write-in) (5%)	Other write-ins 7 (5%)	144		
2016 Trustee Race, Two Openings (Four Year)	March 15, 2016	Robert Tinker 122 (49%)	Bill Morton 122 (49%)	Timothy Knight (write-in) 2 (1%)	248		
2014 Trustee's Race	March 18, 2014	Lillian Bruno 44 (50%)	Sheryl Adams 43 (49%)	Timothy Knight (write-in) 1 (1%)	40		
2013 Trustee's Race	March 19, 2013	Sheryl Adams 40 (100%)	John Shaw Jr. 0 (0%)		44		
2013 Dissolution Vote	February 19, 2013	No 344 (83%)	Yes 71 (17%)		415		
2012 Mayor's Race	March 20, 2012	Matthew Avitabile 193 (53%)	William Ansel-McCabe 169 (46%)	Thomas Wargo 2 (1%)	364		
2012 Trustee Race, Two Openings (Four Year)	March 20, 2012	Robert Tinker 285 (52%)	Bill Morton 265 (48%)		550 Votes		
2010 Trustee Race, Two Openings (Four Year)	March 16, 2010	Thomas Gruning 198 (44%)	Matthew Avitabile 195 (44%)	Paul Hayes 53 (12%)	267(446 Votes)		
2008 Mayor's Race	March 2008	William McCabe 128 (64%)	John Shaw 68 (34%)	Matthew Avitabile (write in) 3 (2%)	199		
2008 Trustee Race, Two Openings (Four Year)	March 2008	Gerald Bowman 119 (37%)	Butch Ingraham 116 (36%)	Andrew Adams 89 (27%)	199 (324 Votes)		
2008 Trustee Race, One Opening (Two Year)	March 2008	Bonnie Ingraham 140 (70%)	Andrew Adams (write in) 2 (1%)	None 56 (28%)	199		
2007 Trustee Race, One Opening (Three Year)	March 2007	Matthew Avitabile 105 (59%)	William Milack 74 (41%)		179		
2006 Trustee Race, Two Openings (Four Year)	March 2006	John Smith 69 (37%)	Jim Navilio 67 (36%)	Matthew Avitabile 51 (27%)	93 or 94 (187 Votes)		
2004 Mayor's Race	March 2004	William McCabe 131 (50.8%)	Lee Lacy 127 (49.2%)		258		
2004 Trustee Race, Two Openings (Four Year)	March 2004	Gerald Bowman 159 (36%)	Butch Ingraham 152 (34%)	John Wingfield 130 (30%)	258 (441 Votes)		
2003 Trustee Race, One Opening	March 2003	William McCabe 18	none 0		18		
2002 Trustee Race, Two Openings (Four Year)	March 2002 (% out of 267 due to # running)	Jim Navilio 135 (51%)	Brian Devlin 126 (47%)	Dean Nunamann 112 (42%)	William McCabe 93(35%)	Evann Bennett 67 (25%)	267 (534 Votes)
2000 Mayor's Race	March 2000	Gary Hayes, 181 (46%)	Henry Doerge 153 (39%)	Peter Braman 59 (15%)	393		
2000 Trustee Race, Two Openings (Four Year)	March 2000	Ruth Strong 256 (42%)	Jeff Christiansen 202 (33%)	William McCabe 151 (25%)	393 (609 Votes)		
1998 Trustee Race, Two Openings (Four Year)	March 1998	Dean Nunamann 41 (48%)	Ed Guntert 41 (48%)	Paul Hayes (write-in) 2 (2%)	Gary Hayes (write-in) 2 (2%)	48 (86 Votes)	
1998 Trustee Race, One Opening (Two Year)	March 1998	Ruth Strong 48 (100%)	None		48		
1996 Mayor's Race	March 1996	Art Wargo, 146 (51.4%)	Buck Mahoney 138 (48.6%)		284		
1996 Trustee Race, Two Openings (Four Year)	March 1996	Russ Strong 202 (42%)	Bill Andrew 147(30%)	Paul Hayes 134 (28%)	284 (483 Votes)		
1994 Trustee Race, Two Openings (Four Year)	May 1994	Dean Nunamann 151 (50%)	Art Wargo 86 (28%)	William Andrew 65 (22%)	151 (302 Votes)		
1994 Trustee Race, One Opening	May 1994	Valorie Leith 122	none 29		151		
1992 Mayor's Race	March 1992	Charlie Slater 249 (62%)	Gary Hayes 152 (38%)		401		
1992 Trustee Race, Two Openings (Four Year)	March 1992	Russ Strong 320 (51%)	Glenn McCarthy 312 (49%)		401 (632 Votes)		
1990 Trustee Race, Two Openings (Four Year)	March 1990	Robert Lang 86 (45%)	Dean Nunamann 86 (45%)	Raymond Swing 18 (10%)	85 (190 Votes)		

Preceded by Trish Bergan	' Mayor Timothy Knight; 2023-present	Incumbent
