= St. Mark's Evangelical Lutheran Church (Middleburgh, New York) =

Historic church in New York, United States

- U.S. National Register of Historic Places
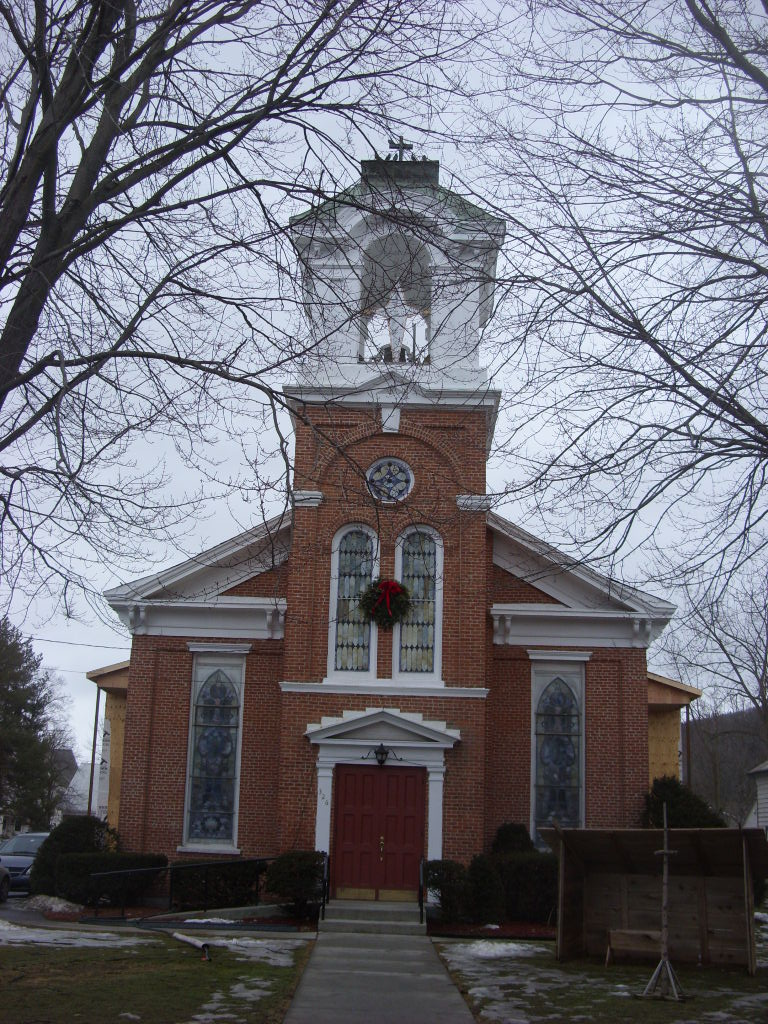
- St. Mark's Evangelical Lutheran Church, February 2009

- Location within New York Location within the United States
- Location: 326 Main St., Middleburgh, New York
- Coordinates: 42°35′56″N 74°20′7″W
- Area: less than one acre
- Built: 1856
- Architectural style: Greek Revival, Italianate
- NRHP reference No.: 06000572
- Added to NRHP: July 14, 2006

St. Mark's Evangelical Lutheran Church is a historic Evangelical Lutheran church at 326 Main Street in Middleburgh, Schoharie County, New York. It is a rectangular, gable roofed, brick structure built in 1856 in the Italianate style. It features an engaged center brick entrance / bell tower with open belfry.

It was listed on the National Register of Historic Places in 2006.
