= Westinghouse =

Westinghouse may refer to:

== Businesses ==
=== Current companies ===
- Westinghouse Electric Corporation, through its subsidiary Westinghouse Licensing Corporation, the company that manages the Westinghouse brand, with licensees:
  - Westinghouse Electric Company, providing nuclear power-related services
  - Westinghouse Electronics, which sells LED and LCD televisions
  - Russell Hobbs, Inc., licensed to make small appliances such as vacuum cleaners under the Westinghouse name, from 2002 to 2008
  - Electrolux, sells household appliances under the Westinghouse name
- Westinghouse Air Brake Technologies Corporation, a transport technology company commonly known as Wabtec
- Siemens Energy Sector, the acquired non-nuclear energy divisions of Westinghouse Electric

=== Former companies and divisions ===
- Westinghouse Electric Corporation, renamed CBS Corporation in 1997
  - Westinghouse Broadcasting (Group W), now integrated into CBS Broadcasting, Inc.
  - White-Westinghouse, acquired by Electrolux in 1986
  - Westinghouse Electronic Systems Group, sold to Northrop Grumman in 1996
  - British Westinghouse, later subsumed into the General Electric Company
- Westinghouse Air Brake Company, founding name of WABCO
- Westinghouse Brake & Signal Company (1928 – c. 2000)
- Westinghouse Signals, earlier name of Westinghouse Rail Systems
- Westinghouse Brakes (UK), now part of Knorr-Bremse
- Westinghouse Combustion Turbine Systems Division, a facility near the Philadelphia Airport later home to an industrial park, “Westinghouse Park”
- Westinghouse Aviation Gas Turbine Division, maker of early turbojet engines (1945–1955)
- Westinghouse Astronuclear Laboratory, late 1950s; Large, Pennsylvania; nuclear space propulsion technologies
- Westinghouse Advanced Energy Systems Division, a renamed 1977 successor to Westinghouse Astronuclear Lab
- Westinghouse Rail Systems, formerly Westinghouse Signals, part of Invensys
- Compagnie des Freins et Signaux Westinghouse, a company in Aulnay-sous-Bois, France near Paris; see History of the transistor

== Buildings and structures ==
- George Westinghouse Bridge, East Pittsburgh, Pennsylvania, USA
- George Westinghouse, Jr., Birthplace and Boyhood Home, Central Bridge, New York, USA
- Westinghouse Park, Pittsburgh, Pennsylvania, USA
- Westinghouse Air Brake Company General Office Building, Wilmerding, Pennsylvania, USA
- George Westinghouse Jones House, Niskayuna, New York, USA, home of a cousin and associate of George Westinghouse

== Media ==
- Westinghouse Studio One, an American radio–television anthology series, created in 1947
  - List of Westinghouse Studio One episodes
  - Twelve Angry Men (Westinghouse Studio One), a teleplay by the studio
- Westinghouse Desilu Playhouse, American television series which aired from 1958 to 1960
- The Westinghouse Sign, a large, animated, electric sign located in Pittsburgh, Pennsylvania, USA
- Westinghouse Works, 1904, a collection of short films of various Westinghouse manufacturing plants

== People ==
- George Westinghouse (1846–1914), the founder of Westinghouse Electric Corporation

== Products ==
- List of Westinghouse locomotives
- Westinghouse Electric Company's AP1000, the first Generation III+ reactor to receive final design approval from the U.S.
- Westinghouse Farm Engine, a small, vertical boilered farm engine made by George Westinghouse from 1886 to 1917
- NZR RM class Westinghouse railcar, an experimental and inaugural railcar built in New Zealand in 1914

== Science ==
- Westinghouse effect, a variant of the social-scientific observer's paradox
- Westinghouse Science Talent Search, now called the Regeneron Science Talent Search, an American science competition for high school students
- Westinghouse transistron, an early bipolar transistor invented in France at "Compagnie des Freins et Signaux Westinghouse" by the German scientists Mataré and Welker

== Other uses ==
- Westinghouse High School (disambiguation)
- George Westinghouse Award (disambiguation)
