= North Point Breeze =

- Neighborhood of Pittsburgh
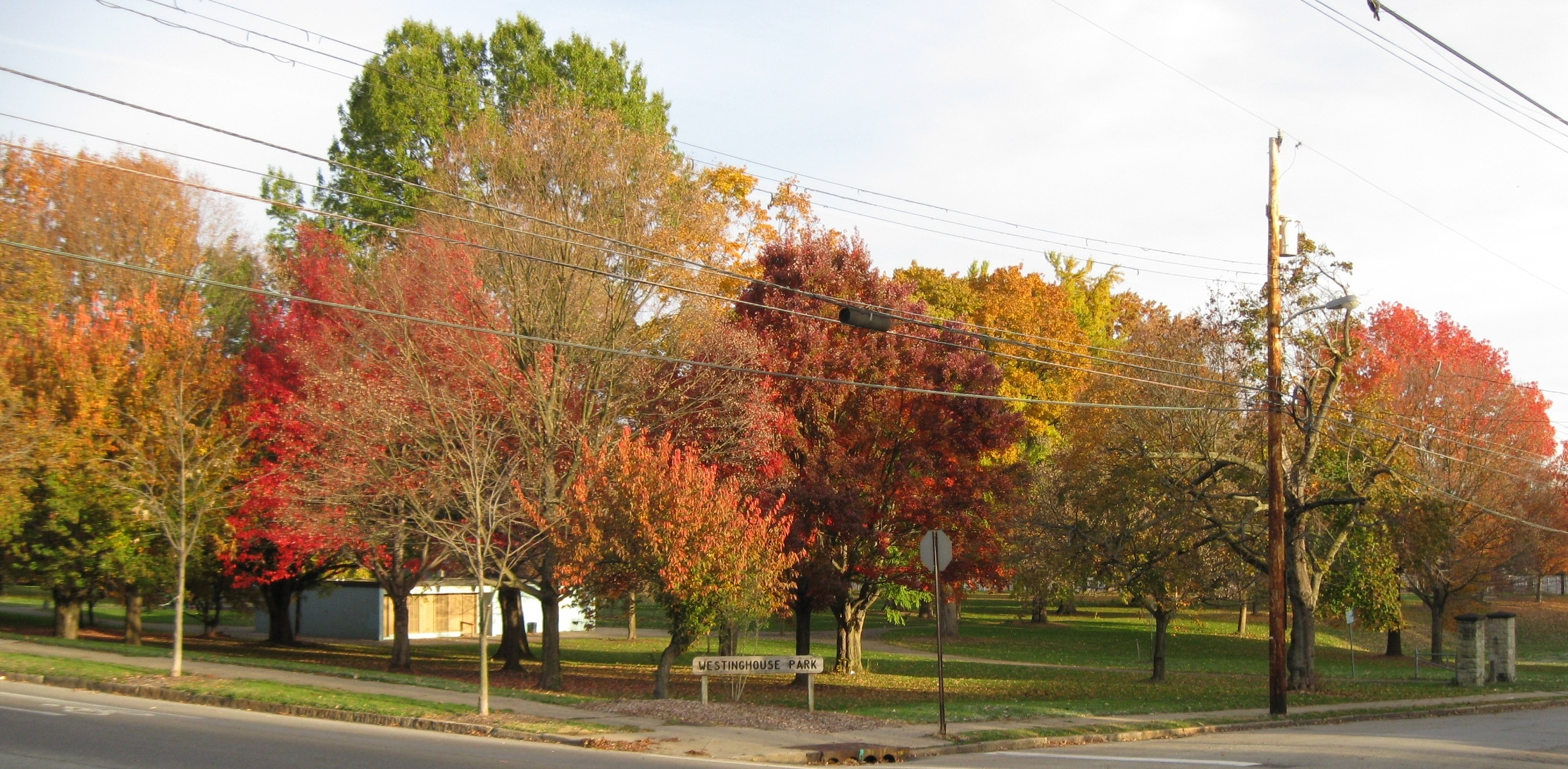
- A view of Westinghouse Park from the southeast

- Coordinates: 40.452°N 79.902°W
- Country: United States
- State: Pennsylvania
- County: Allegheny County
- City: Pittsburgh

Area
  - Total: 0.286 sq mi (0.74 km^{2})

Population (2010)
  - Total: 2,054
  - Density: 7,180/sq mi (2,770/km^{2})

North Point Breeze (or Point Breeze North) is a mostly residential neighborhood in the East End of Pittsburgh, Pennsylvania, United States. It has a zip code of 15208, and representation on Pittsburgh City Council by the council member for District 9 (Northeast Neighborhoods).

== History and notable features ==
This neighborhood was the site of the estate of the entrepreneur George Westinghouse, which was converted into Westinghouse Park after 1918, as well as the 'Greenlawn' estate of Henry J. Heinz, located one block south. The Heinz property was subdivided into residential lots after the mansion was knocked down, but the original carriage house was converted into an apartment building and remains standing on what is now Meade Place. The stone wall that stood at the perimeter of the original Heinz estate remains standing, along with a decorative iron fence along Penn Avenue.

Fifth Avenue borders the western end of the neighborhood, with the nearby Bakery Square development and Mellon Park. Along its northern border is a Norfolk Southern Railway line and the Martin Luther King Jr. East Busway, with a stop at North Homewood Avenue serving the neighborhood.

The eastern side of the neighborhood is home to light-industry and commercial businesses, including the Construction Junction architectural-reuse center, as well as the Allegheny County and City of Pittsburgh 9-1-1 call center. Shady Lane School, a leading area preschool first established in 1966 in the nearby Shadyside neighborhood, has been at the corners of Penn and North Braddock Avenues since 1992. There are also a food coop, a rental-storage warehouse, and a small residential enclave. Historically, the short-lived Penn Motor Car Company operated on Thomas Boulevard from 1910 to 1912.

The Point Breeze North Development Corporation is the local neighborhood association, promoting real estate, historic preservation, and public safety issues.

Both of writer John Edgar Wideman's memoirs, Brothers and Keepers and Hoop Roots, use Westinghouse Park as a setting, as does his fictional Homewood Trilogy.

== Surrounding neighborhoods ==
North Point Breeze has five borders, four with the Pittsburgh neighborhoods of Homewood West and Homewood South to the north, Point Breeze to the south, and Larimer to the west. The other border is with the borough of Wilkinsburg to the east. North Point Breeze also runs catty-corner with the Pittsburgh neighborhood of Shadyside to the west at the intersection of Penn and Fifth Avenues. This intersection also serves as a north-south "diagonal" for the Pittsburgh neighborhoods of Larimer and Point Breeze.

== See also ==
- List of Pittsburgh neighborhoods
