= Central Bridge, New York =

- Census-designated place
- Location within New York Location within the United States
- Coordinates: 42°42′40″N 74°20′19″W
- Country: United States
- State: New York
- County: Schoharie
- Towns: Schoharie; Esperance

Area
  - Total: 2.87 sq mi (7.43 km^{2})
  - Land: 2.86 sq mi (7.40 km^{2})
  - Water: 0.015 sq mi (0.04 km^{2})
- Elevation: 621 ft (189 m)

Population (2020)
  - Total: 740
  - Density: 259.1/sq mi (100.04/km^{2})
- Time zone: UTC-5 (Eastern (EST))
  - Summer (DST): UTC-4 (EDT)
- ZIP Code: 12035 (Central Bridge); 12092 (Howes Cave)
- Area codes: 518/838
- FIPS code: 36-13530
- GNIS feature ID: 2628041

Central Bridge is a hamlet and census-designated place (CDP) within the towns of Schoharie and Esperance in Schoharie County, New York, United States. As of the 2020 census, the population was 740.

Central Bridge is in northeastern Schoharie County, in the northwestern part of the town of Schoharie and the southwestern section of Esperance. It is in the valley of Cobleskill Creek where it joins Schoharie Creek, a northward-flowing tributary of the Mohawk River. It is bordered to the south by Interstate 88 and to the east by Schoharie Creek. New York State Route 7 runs through the southern part of the community, leading east 11 miles (18 km) to Duanesburg and 23 miles (37 km) to Schenectady, and west 8 miles (13 km) to Cobleskill. New York State Route 30A passes through the center of the CDP, leading north 3 miles (5 km) to Sloansville and 18 miles (29 km) to Fultonville.

The hamlet of Old Central Bridge is in the southern part of the CDP.

== Demographics ==
Historical population
Census	Pop.	Note	%±
2010	593		—
2020	740		24.8%
U.S. Decennial Census

== Notable person ==
- George Westinghouse, pioneer in the electrical industry; born in Central Bridge
