= George Westinghouse Jr. Birthplace and Boyhood Home =

Historic house in New York, United States

- U.S. National Register of Historic Places
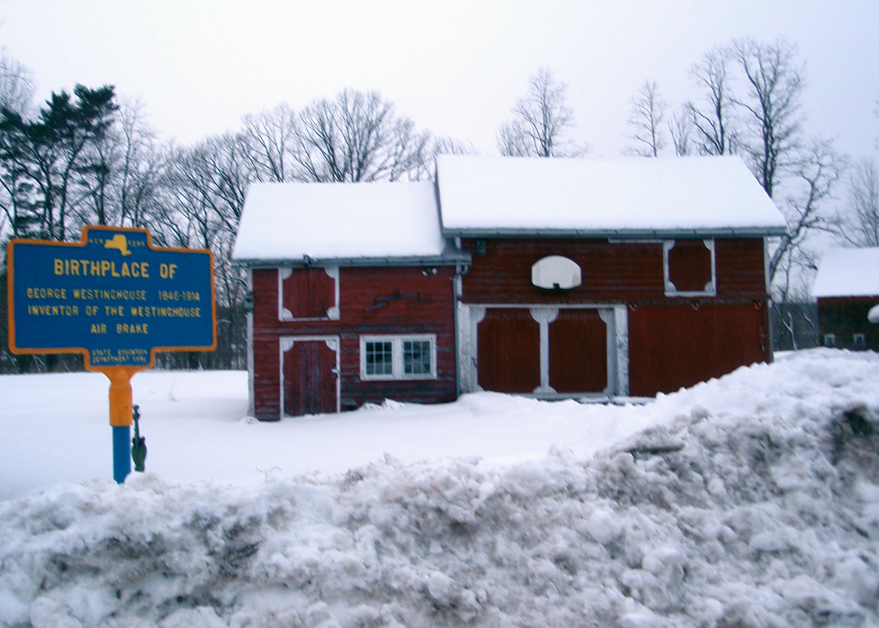
- George Westinghouse Jr. birthplace, February 2011

- Location within New York Location within the United States
- Location: Westinghouse Rd., Central Bridge, New York
- Coordinates: 42°42′32″N 74°19′56″W
- Area: 3 acres (1.2 ha)
- Built: 1846; 180 years ago
- NRHP reference No.: 86000489
- Added to NRHP: March 20, 1986

The George Westinghouse Jr. Birthplace and Boyhood Home is a historic home located at Central Bridge in Schoharie County, New York. The property includes two 19th-century residences, two small barns, a well house and privy, as well as the site of a combined blacksmith shop and threshing machine works. The house where inventor George Westinghouse was born, built circa 1825, is a 1 1/2-story, rectangular frame residence in a vernacular Greek Revival style.

It was listed on the National Register of Historic Places on March 20, 1986.

== See also ==
- Westinghouse Memorial
- Westinghouse Park
- George Westinghouse Bridge
