= Westinghouse High School =

Westinghouse High School can refer to:

- Westinghouse High School (Pittsburgh), Pittsburgh Public Schools, Pittsburgh, Pennsylvania
- George Westinghouse Career and Technical Education High School, New York City Department of Education, Brooklyn, New York
- Westinghouse High School (Chicago), Chicago Public Schools, Chicago, Illinois

== See also ==
- Westinghouse (disambiguation)
