= George Westinghouse Award =

The George Westinghouse Award may refer to:

- George Westinghouse Medal given by the American Society for Mechanical Engineering
- George Westinghouse Award (ASEE) given by the American Society for Engineering Education
- Intel Science Talent Search awards
- American Association for the Advancement of Science (AAAS) Westinghouse Science Journalism Award, formerly known at different times as the AAAS Science Journalism Award and the AAAS Kavli Science Journalism Award
