= Westinghouse Farm Engine =

A Westinghouse Farm Engine from 1890

The Westinghouse Farm Engine was a small, vertical-boiler steam engine built by the Westinghouse Company that emerged in the late 19th century. In the transition from horses to machinery, small portable engines were hauled by horses from farm to farm to give power where it was needed. It provided power to agricultural machines such as sawmills, threshing machines, and corn shellers. Many small workshops used them as well.

The farm engine was developed by George Westinghouse Sr., father of the famous inventor and industrialist George Westinghouse Jr. The cylinder, steam chest, cross-head guide, and the boxes for the crankshaft bearings were all cast in a single piece to assure mechanical exactness and perfect alignment of piston and crank. The engine was made of brass and steel. The machine helped American farms transition from horse to machines. It came in 6, 10, and 15 horsepower sizes. The Westinghouse Farm engine was said to have a short, quick stroke to make it lighter. This design helped to make sure that the engine did not roll over. The engines were equipped with an adjustable governor, pop safety valve, steam gauge, feedwater heater, direct-acting pump, whistle, blower, brake, and a full supply of wrenches and fire tools. This helped keep the engine efficient, durable, and convenient. The engines were produced from 1881 to 1917 when larger, standard farm engines superseded them.
