= Westinghouse Park =

Park in Pennsylvania, United States

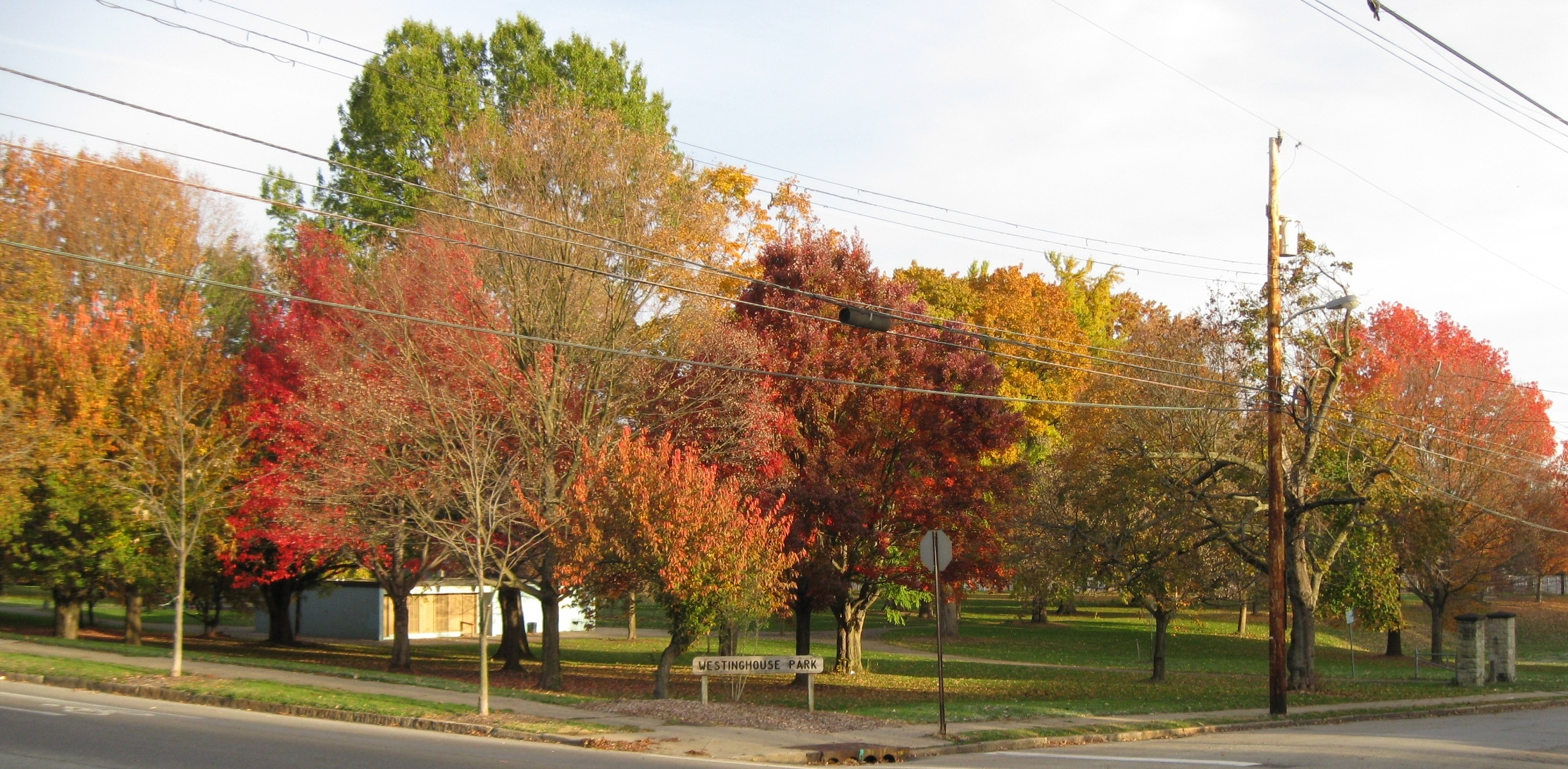
- A view of Westinghouse Park from the south east
- Interactive map of Westinghouse Park
- Location: Pittsburgh, Pennsylvania
- Coordinates: 40.4532°N 79.9027°W
- Established: 1919; 107 years ago

Westinghouse Park is a city-block sized municipal park in Pittsburgh, Pennsylvania.

The park land is the former estate of George Westinghouse, an American entrepreneur and engineer, and his wife Marguerite. With an area of about 10 acres, it was the site of his mansion known as Solitude. At this house, Westinghouse worked with his engineers, including Nikola Tesla, and entertained notable people of the day, including scientist William Thomson (Lord Kelvin), and congressman and later president William McKinley. Close by was another building, a carriage house, that housed his private laboratory in the basement. There, he developed some of his residential electric lighting technology, installing a generator and running cables to the main house, with wires that were left exposed on the interior walls, so as not to cut into the woodwork. Also there, Westinghouse invented methods to control and transmit natural gas for both industrial and residential consumers. In the winter of 1883/1884, seeking a source of natural gas in his own "backyard," Westinghouse ordered drilling on his estate. When gas was struck on May 22, 1884, a blowout resulted in the uncontrolled release of gas for about a week. Westinghouse devised a way to cap the well. An illumination test was conducted by igniting the gas jet at the top of a tall pipe. It initially produced a 100-foot flame that illuminated a mile-wide area to a brightness sufficient to read a newspaper. This well was designated as "Westinghouse Well No. 1" or "Old No. 1" to distinguish it from several other wells that were drilled in the area. Eventually, several natural gas derricks towered above the estate's Victorian gardens. In modern times there is no above-ground trace left of these derricks.

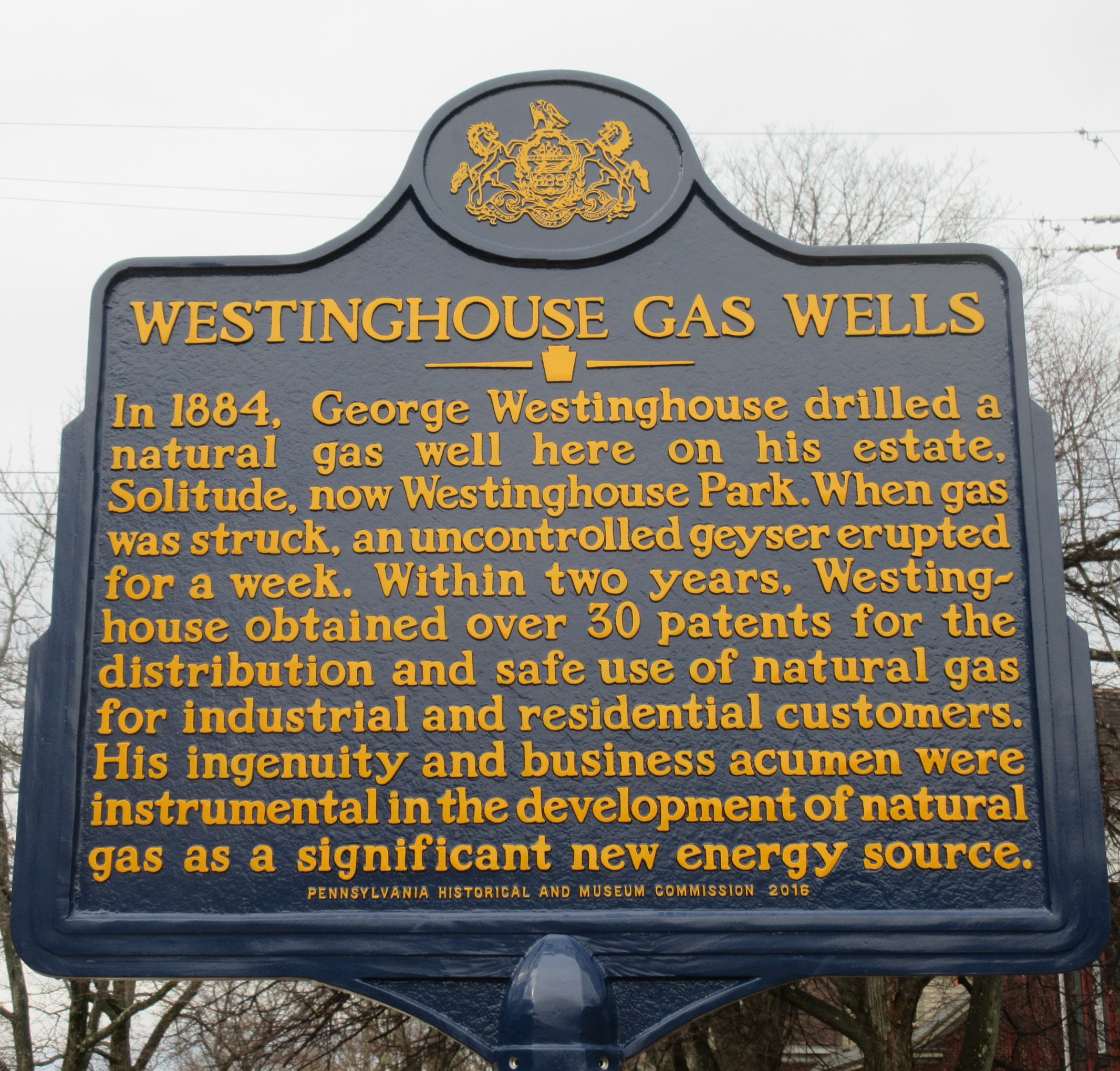
Sign in Westinghouse Park describing drilling for natural gas in 1884 on the grounds of the "Solitude" estate.

The park's history began when Westinghouse, upon his death in 1914, bequeathed the North Point Breeze mansion to his son, who in turn sold the property in 1918 to the Engineers' Society of Western Pennsylvania. The Society's intent was to establish both a city park and a memorial to Westinghouse there. As per a deed stipulation, the house was razed in 1919, and the park was developed; the Westinghouse Memorial, however, was erected a few miles away in Schenley Park.

Writer John Edgar Wideman made frequent references to the park in his books. Both of his memoirs, Brothers and Keepers and Hoop Roots, use the park as a setting, as does his fictional Homewood Trilogy.

In 2006, archeological exploration found numerous small artifacts and reestablished the location of the long-vanished gas well. An excellent view of the park, showing some of the ancient specimen trees, can be found at Ref.

In 2019, the Westinghouse Park 2nd Century Coalition was formed to improve the park's facilities, explore and exhibit its Westinghouse history, and provide it with ongoing stewardship. See the external link below.

In late 2025, the Pittsburgh City Council designated the park as a Pittsburgh Historic Landmark.

== Images ==
Shown here are several images related to the historic Westinghouse Park site. First is a photograph of the mansion Solitude seen from the east, from Lang Avenue. One sees a three-story house with a four-story tower and a mansard roof. An enclosed porch wraps around to the south. Sun awnings on the windows and leafy trees indicate a summer setting. The excellent condition of the house suggests the photograph predates the death of George Westinghouse in 1914. Next is another photo of the same house from the south, from about the distance of Thomas Boulevard. A corner of the former greenhouse is seen on the far left. Next is a photograph taken before 1890 of the gas derrick that became known as the "Westinghouse Old No.1" well in present-day Westinghouse Park. This picture shows also the carriage house and the mansion Solitude on the far right. A second derrick is also visible. The view is from the south, from present-day Thomas Boulevard. Small figures of children and workers can be seen near the well. An article in Harper's Weekly in 1885 featured an article on "The Gas Wells of Pennsylvania," and included an engraving of Westinghouse's "Old No.1" derrick flaming as an "illuminator" at night. The article extolls the revolutionary nature of using cheap natural gas as an alternative to dirty and expensive coal by industry and households, and the bonanza the recent discovery of this resource in Western Pennsylvania would bring to the economy of the region.

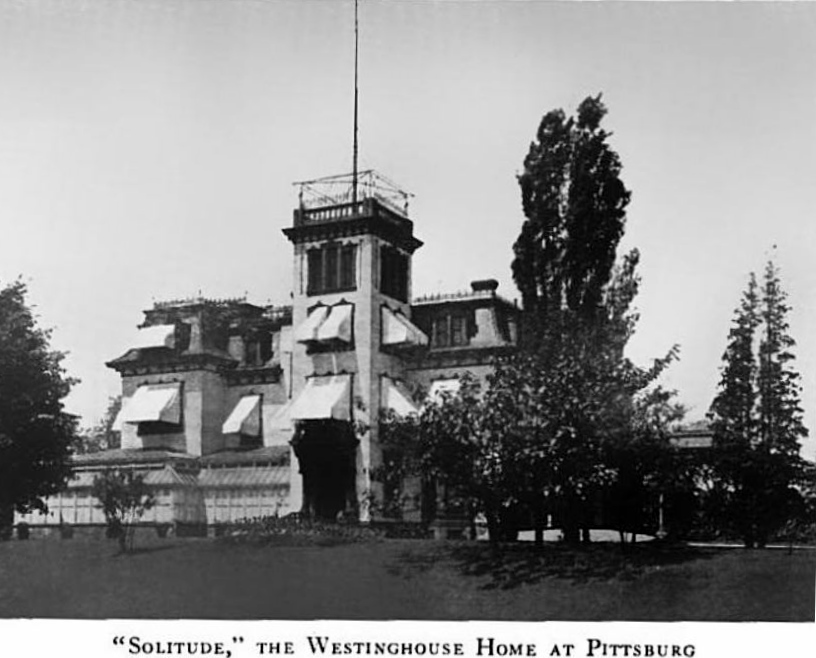
Photograph of "Solitude", home of George Westinghouse in Pittsburgh, PA, seen from the east. From Ref.

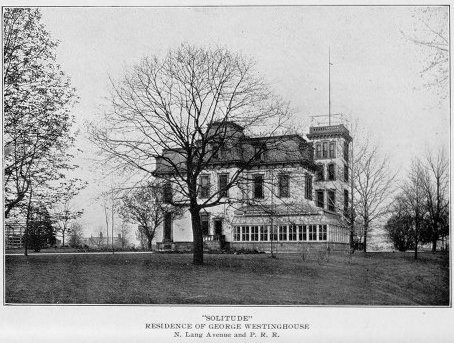
Photograph of "Solitude", home of George Westinghouse in Pittsburgh, PA, seen from the south. From Ref.

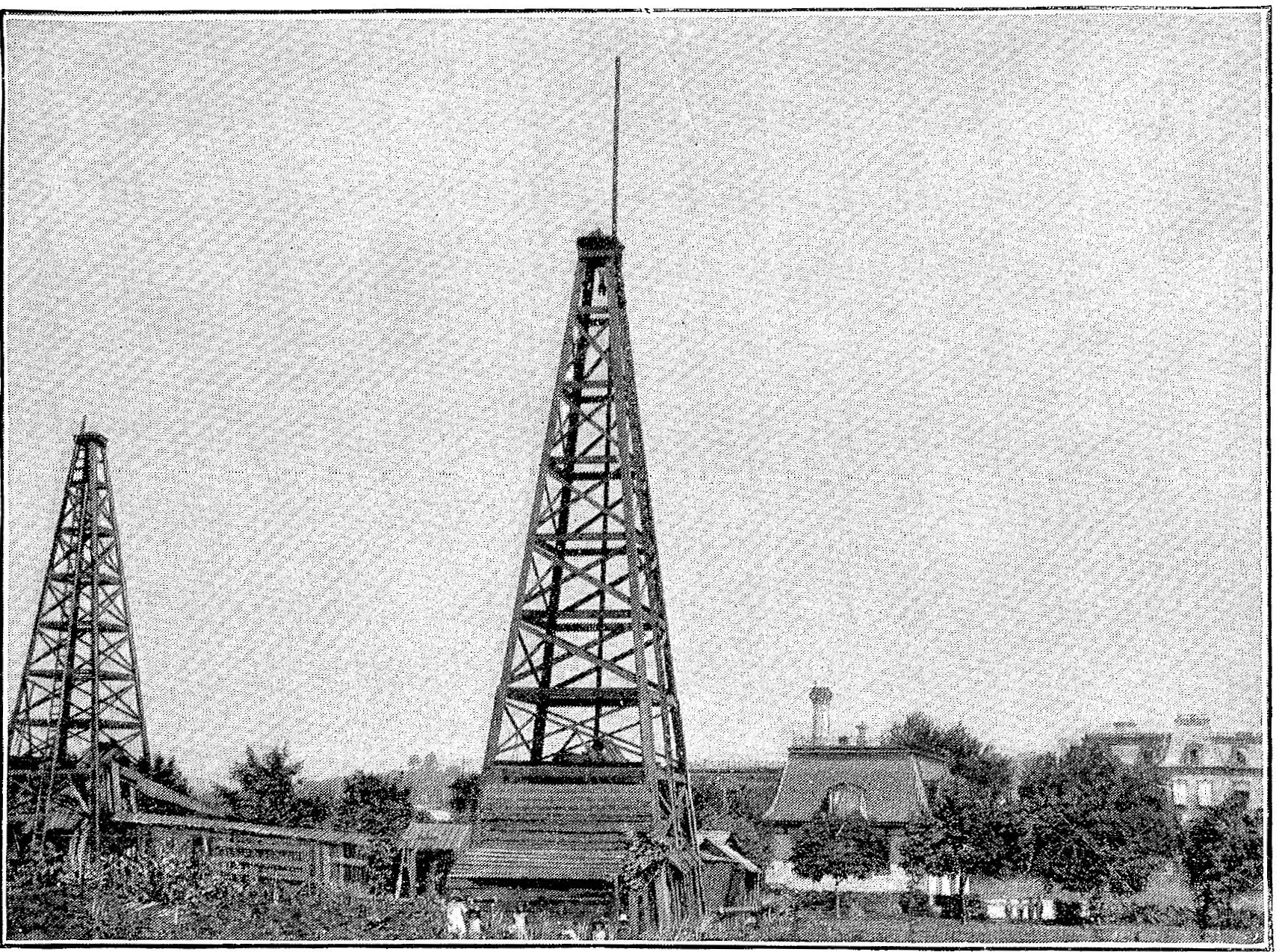
Photograph of Westinghouse "Old No.1" natural gas derrick in daytime, sometime between June 1884 and end of 1889, located at the Solitude estate in present-day Westinghouse Park. The Westinghouse carriage house/laboratory and the mansion are seen on the right.

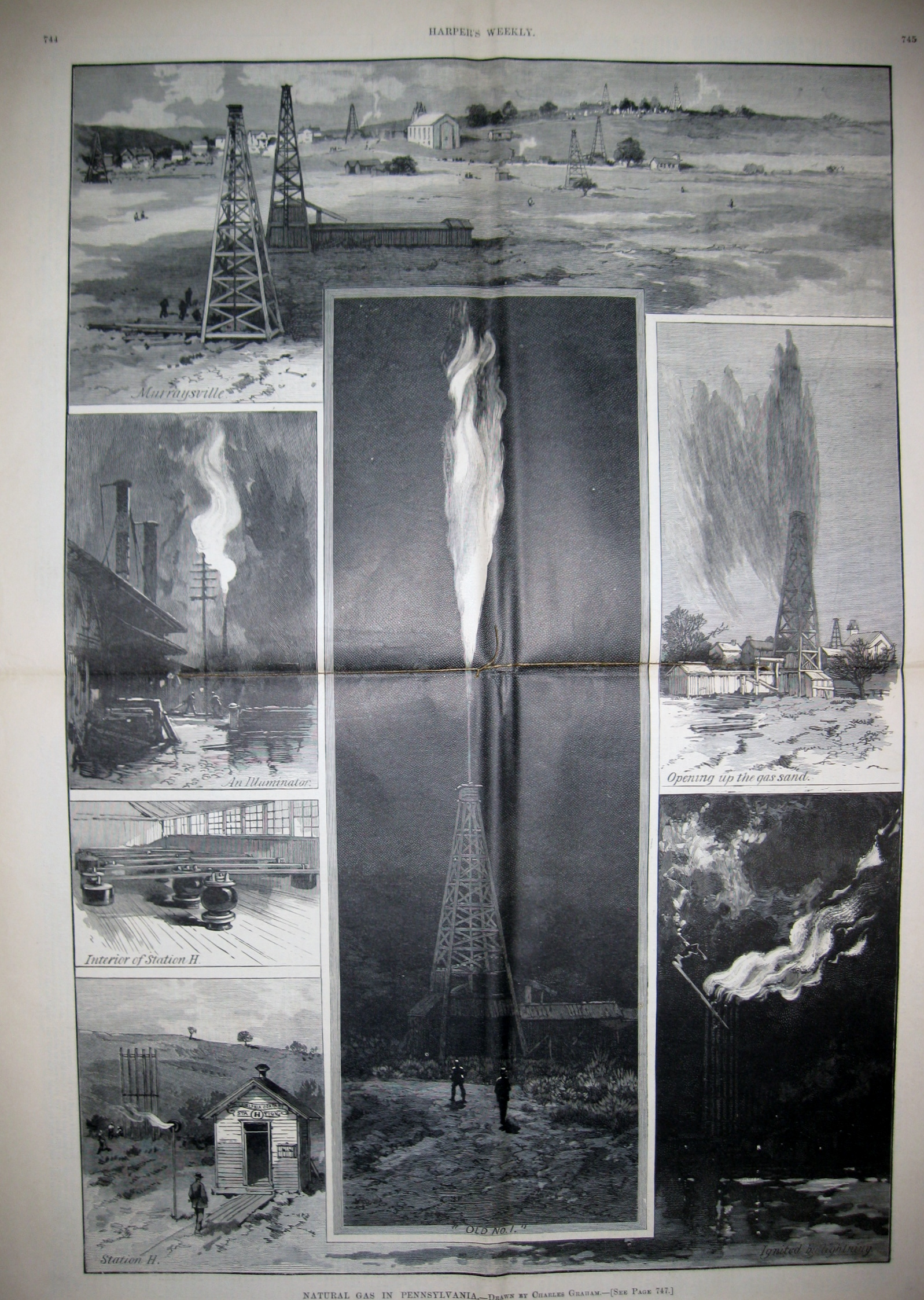
Westinghouse "Old No.1" natural gas derrick in a controlled burn (center), sometime between June 1884 and November 1885, located at the Solitude estate in the present-day Westinghouse Park. Additional regional natural gas facilities from the time are shown, including a field in Murrysville, PA (top).
