= List of New York State Historic Markers in Greene County, New York =

This is an incomplete list of New York State Historic Markers in Greene County, New York.

== Listings county-wide ==
	Marker name	Image	Date designated	Location	City or Town	Coords	Marker text
1	EARLY CHURCH			On NYS 23 about 1/2 mile east of East Ashland	Ashland, Town Of, New York		First Congregational Church of Ashland Built Here in Old Windham 1799
2	TRINITY			On NYS 23 at East Ashland	Ashland, Town Of, New York	42°17′53″N 74°17′54″W	Church Inc. May 20, 1799, Earliest Episcopal Organization of Old Town of Windham
3	A. VAN LOON			On NYS 385 at Athens	Athens, Town Of, New York	42.266946°N 73.805299°W	House Built 1724 By Albertus Van Loon Occupied as Residence Since Date of Erection
4	BLACK HORSE			On US 9W about 3 mi NW of Athens	Athens, Town Of, New York		Inn Built in 1791 by Isaac Hallenbeck
5	JAN VAN LOON			On NYS 385 at Athens	Athens, Town Of, New York		House Built 1706 by Jan Van Loon Chief Holder Loonenburgh Pat. 1688. Athens Village First Called Loonenburgh
6	NORTHUP HOUSE			On NYS 385 at Athens	Athens, Town Of, New York		House Built 1803 Home of Isaac Northup Founder of Athens Village Incorporated 1805
7	BELL FACTORY			On NYS 23 & NYS 145, South Cairo	Cairo, Town of, New York		of William Barton Earliest American Maker of Sleigh Bells Stood on This Stream 1828
8	IRON FORGE			On County Road at Purling	Cairo, Town Of, New York		Of Enoch Hyde And Benjamin Hall Stood at First Fall 1788 First in Greene County
9	MASSACRE 1780			On Town Road about 1 1/2 miles Southwest of Purling	Cairo, Town Of, New York		Johannes Strope & Wife Killed by Indians Frederick Schermerhorn Carried Captive to Canada
10	WOODSTOCK			On NYS 32 about 1-mile (1.6 km) north of Cairo	Cairo, Town of, New York		First Settlement in Town of Cairo by James Barker and Tenantry in 1791
11	"UNCLE SAM"			On West Bridge Street, Catskill	Catskill, Town of, New York		Bridge Samuel Wilson, Whose Name Inspired National Symbol "Uncle Sam" Lived Nearby From 1817-1822
12	100 RODS NORTH			On Water Street, Catskill	Catskill, Town of, New York		Stood the First Grist Mill in Greene County Built in 1675 by Dirck T. Van Vechten
13	CATSKILL			At intersection Green & Main Streets Catskill	Catskill, Town of, New York		Packet First Newspaper in County Printed on This Site by Mackay Croswell & Co. August 6, 1792
14	HOME OF			On Town Road, Jefferson Heights	Catskill, Town of, New York		Rev. Johannes Schuneman "Dutch Dominie Of The Catskills" Built 1792
15	HOP-O-NOSE			On Main Street, Catskill	Catskill, Town of, New York	42°12′42″N 73°51′28″W	Site of Indian Village Purchased from Indians in 1682 Loveridge Patent
16	MARTIN			On West Main Street, Catskill	Catskill, Town of, New York		Van Buren 8th President of the U.S. was Married in This House to Hannah Hoes in 1807. House Built in 1797.
17	OLD KATSKILL			On Town Road about 1/2 mile south of Leeds	Catskill, Town of, New York	42°15′2.12″N 73°54′28.08″W	Reformed Dutch Church of Katskill Kockshackie Stood on This Hill Built 1733
18	OLD KATSKILL			On County Road about 1/2 mile south of Leeds	Catskill, Town of, New York		House Built in 1729 by Garret Van Bergen. Barn Built 1680 by Marte Gerretse Van Bergen. Formerly Indian Village Site.
19	PAPER MILL			NYS 23 & NYS 145, Jefferson Heights	Catskill, Town of, New York		First in Greene County ¼ Mile at Foot of Hill Built in 1800 By Nathan Benjamin
20	PIETER SOUSER'S INN			On NYS 23 & NYS 145 at Jefferson Heights	Catskill, Town of, New York		Place Where Political Meetings were Held Before 1797 Racetrack of the Pioneers Near by
21	SITE OF			On NYS 23 & NYS 145, Leeds	Catskill, Town of, New York	42°15′20.88″N 73°54′12.64″W	First Log House in This Village Built in 1675 Stood 100 Feet South Along Road to Fording Place
22	STONE HOUSE			On West Main Street, Catskill	Catskill, Town of, New York	42°13′9″N 73°52′11″W	Built in 1762 by Lieut. Col. Cornelius Dubois. Surrender of Cornwallis Celebrated Here.
	STONE BRIDGE			On Route 145, East Durham, New York	East Durham, New York	42°22′58″N 74°07′06″W	STONE BRIDGE - Built 1800 as part of the Susquehannah Turnpike.
23				On NYS 23 & NYS 145, Leeds	Catskill, Town of, New York	42°15′17.89″N 73°54′2.81″W	Old Inn of Martin G. Schuneman Built 1796
24				On NYS 23A about 1-mile (1.6 km) east of Kiskatom	Catskill, Town of, New York		Abeel House Built About 1721 in the Back-oven Rebuilt About 1752 David and Anthony Abeel Captured by Indians 1780
25				On NYS 23A & NYS 32A about 1/2 mile west of Palenville	Catskill, Town of, New York		Indian Trail to Fort on Round Top Now Kaaterskill Clove
26				On NYS 23, & NYS 145, Leeds	Catskill, Town of, New York	42°15′23.83″N 73°54′24.91″W	Pachquiack "Open Country" Purchased from Indians by Jan Bronk, 1675 Formerly Madison, Now Leeds
27				On NYS 23 & NYS 145 at Jefferson Heights	Catskill, Town of, New York	42°14′8.59″N 73°53′4.6″W	Footpath from Old Indian Fort Called Casteel Hoogte to Coxsackie
28				NYS 23 & NYS 145, Jefferson Heights	Catskill, Town of, New York		House Built in 1814 by Capt. Jos. Allen Sea Captain During Revolution
29	"FIRST HOUSE ON THE HILL"			On Ely Street, Coxsackie	Coxsackie, Town of, New York		Built by Dr. John Ely of Newry, Albany County, About the Year 1800.
30	BRONCK HOUSE			On Private Road 300 feet (91 m) off US 9W, 1 1/2 mile south of Coxsackie	Coxsackie, Town of, New York	42°20′31″N 73°50′55″W	Oldest House Used as Such in Greene County Built by Pieter Bronck 1663
31	1/2 MILE TO			On NYS 145, Durham	Durham, Town Of, New York		Meeting House Hill Bronze Tablet and Boulder Mark the Site of First Presbyterian Church, Durham Organized November 8, 1792
32	R.R. DISASTER			On NYS 145 about 2 miles west of Village of East Durham, at Durham Center Museum	Durham, Town Of, New York	42°23′22.42″N 74°07′42.67″W)	In 1840 One Half Mile East Train Plunged Through Trestle into Creek at High Rock Ended Career of Canajoharie-Catskill Railroad
33	BENJAMIN SPEES			On NYS 32 at Greenville	Greenville, Town of, New York		Settled Here in 1781 in a Log Cabin Built by a Tory
34	DR. JOHN ELY			On County Road about 2 miles (3.2 km) north of East Greenville	Greenville, Town of, New York		First Physician in Town of Greenville Lived in This House
35	EARLY SAWMILL			On NYS 32 about 3 miles (4.8 km) south of Greenville	Greenville, Town of, New York		Owned and Operated by Eleazer Knowles Stood on This Site
36	FIRST SCHOOL			On NYS 32 at Greenville	Greenville, Town of, New York		A Cabin Built of Logs Stood on This Site First Teacher was a Son of Rev. Eleazer Hotchkin
37	GREENVILLE			At intersection of NYS 32 & NYS 81 at Greenville	Greenville, Town of, New York		1803 Town Taken from Freehold and Coxsackie Called Greenfield, First Town Meeting Held 1809 Named Greenville
38	SITE OF			On County Road about 2 miles (3.2 km) north of East Greenville	Greenville, Town of, New York		Early Tannery Owned by Daniel Miller Who Came from East Hampton, L.I.
39	SITE OF LOG CABIN OF			On NYS 145 about 2 1/2 miles west of Village of East Durham	Greenville, Town of, New York		Edward Lake Pioneer Who Settled Here in 1781 on a 600 Acre Lot
40	SITE OF LOG CABIN OF			On NYS 32 about 1-mile (1.6 km) south of Greenville	Greenville, Town of, New York		Eleazer Knowles Pioneer Who Settled Here in 1781 on a 600 Acre Lot
41	REFORMED			On NYS 23 at Prattsville	Prattsville, Town Of, New York		Church First in Mountain Towns of Greene County Organized in 1798 Built in 1804
42				On NYS 23 at Hensonville	Windham, Town Of, New York		First Log House Built Here in 1818 by John Henson Founder of Hensonville
43				On NYS 23 at Windham	Windham, Town Of, New York		Against This Rock George Stimson First Settler of the Town of Windham Built his Log Cabin in 1785
44	1808 Sayre Home			On Jerome Avenue in Cairo	Cairo, New York	42°18′10.7″N 74°00′11.3″W	1808 Sayre Home Daniel Sayre purchased 100 acres along Shingle Kill 1794 Shoemaker, Justice 1800-1819 1st Town Supervisor 1803 Elected State Assembly 1804

== See also ==
- List of New York State Historic Markers
- National Register of Historic Places listings in New York
- List of National Historic Landmarks in New York
