= Greene County Transit =

Bus system in Greene County, NY

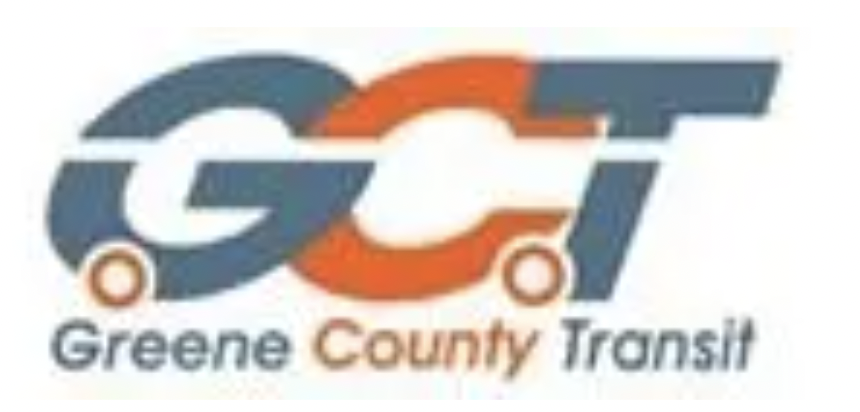
- Parent: ARC of Ulster-Greene
- Founded: July 2015
- Commenced operation: June 2016
- Headquarters: 311 West Bridge St, Catskill, NY 12414
- Service area: Greene County, NY
- Service type: Fixed Route, Dial-a-Ride
- Routes: 7, plus Dial-a-Ride
- Hubs: Catskill Hub; 311 West Bridge St, Catskill, NY; Located at the ARC of Ulster-Greene
- Fleet: Minibuses
- Annual ridership: 15,989 (2023)
- Operator: ARC of Ulster-Greene
- Website: Official website

Greene County Transit is a bus system in Greene County, New York. The system offers fixed bus routes throughout the county, plus a route connecting to Hudson in Columbia County and countywide dial-a-ride service. The system is managed, owned, and operated by the ARC of Ulster-Greene, with oversight by the Greene County Department of Economic Development, Tourism and Planning. The majority of the system's funding is from the Federal Transit Administration, but Greene County and New York State also contribute funding.

== History ==
The first bus service in Greene County began in 1915, when Mountain View Coach Lines began service from Coxsackie to Albany. This service lasted throughout the 1920s, and in 1927, bus service started between Catskill and New York City. County-operated bus service began sometime in the 1990s, and was operated by First Student and branded as the Rip Van Winkle Express until 2015. (Note: A 2016 article claims that the system was operated for the last "20 years or so", meaning a 1990s start date.) The system operated once-per-week routes serving various areas of the county, in addition a shuttle in the village of Catskill, all with extremely low ridership. In July of 2015, the Greene County Legislature announced that the Rip Van Winkle Express would be merged with the ARC of Ulster-Greene (a non-profit agency for children with disabilities), and using their combined resources, the bus system would transform. In June of 2016, this service was launched, with five routes fanning out across Greene County.

In 2017, expansions were planned to connect with Hudson Amtrak station, as well as Ulster County Area Transit in Saugerties. While no connection with UCAT exists, a bus route, the 711, from Catskill to Hudson was launched in August 2018, and continues to run as of February 2025.

== Routes ==
Greene County Transit operates 7 fixed routes. All routes operate as loops to and from Catskill.

Route	Areas Served	Notes
700/701; Blue Line	Catskill, New Baltimore, Coxsackie, Athens, Jefferson Heights, Leeds, Cairo	
702; Orange Line	Catskill, Kiskatom, Cairo	
706; Brown Line	Catskill, Earlton, Norton Hill, Oak Hill, East Durham, Acra, Cairo, Leeds	
708; White Line	Catskill, Palenville, Haines Falls, Tannersville, Hunter, Jewett, Lexington, Prattsville, Ashland, Windham	Operates only on Wednesdays
709; Red Line	Catskill, Leeds, Cairo, Acra, Windham, Ashland, Prattsville, Lexington, Jewett, Hunter	Operates only on Fridays
710; Catskill Shuttle	Catskill, Jefferson Heights	
711; Teal Line	Catskill, Greenport (Columbia-Greene Community College), Hudson	Operates 11 runs per day, connecting Greene and Columbia Counties
705; Green Line; Dial-a-Ride	Countywide Dial-A-Ride service	

== Ridership ==
Total system ridership was 2,325 riders per year in 2009, before the takeover by the ARC of Ulster-Greene. After the system's reintroduction under the ARC, ridership jumped to 11,453 in 2017, and 15,989 in 2023.

Despite this increase, the system's ridership remains significantly lower than other nearby systems—it is approximately half of Columbia County's yearly transit ridership.

=== Ridership since 2016 ===
All figures below are from Federal Transit Administration data.

Year	Unlinked Passenger Trips
2025	15,820
2024	19,709
2023	15,989
2022	13,789
2021	7,453
2020	5,999
2019	13,428
2018	11,653
2017	11,453
2016	8,513

== Financial performance ==
In 2023, the system had a farebox recovery ratio of 3.6%.

== Fleet ==
The fleet consists of 10 buses, all of which are minibuses, mostly (if not entirely) from the Ford E-450 family.
