= Canajoharie and Catskill Railroad =

Railroad in New York, United States

Map

The Canajoharie and Catskill Rail Road (C&C) ran from Catskill, New York, to Potter's Hollow, New York. Originally it was intended to extend the railroad to Canajoharie, New York.

Chartered in 1830, it never achieved its intended goal of connecting its namesake villages. A ground breaking ceremony was held in 1831, but construction did not begin in earnest until 1836 when the route was surveyed by George H. Cook. By the end of construction a total of 26 1/4 miles of track had been laid.

The track consisted of wooden rails topped with strap iron. The track generally followed Catskill Creek, and the communities served included Cairo and Leeds. The first trains, consisting of cars hauled by horses, ran in 1839. The line's only locomotive, Mountaineer, began operation in 1840. The C&C carried both passengers and freight. Commodities carried included iron, brick, wood, various agricultural products, and household goods including such items as candles, tea, salt, snuff and raisins.

On 4 May 1840 the High Rock covered bridge over Catskill Creek collapsed under the weight of the train, killing one Jehiel Tyler and injuring a number of others. This disaster is marked by a New York State historic plaque on Route 145, about two and half miles west of East Durham.

Following the bridge collapse, the line collapsed financially and was sold and scrapped in 1842.

Starting in Catskill, New York, known mileposts along the route are:
Mile - Description
26.05 - Rail Road Office
25.73 - First bridge over the Catskill Creek
25.23 - Second bridge over the Catskill Creek
23.93 - Paper Mill
23.03 - Third bridge over the Catskill Creek
22.78 - Lime kiln
22.25 - Henry M. Vedder's residence
21.43 - Toll Gate
20.83 - Wolcott's Mills (Montgomeryville).
19.35 - Scotch Rock
19.18 - South Cairo
18.90 - Depot
18.63 - Opposite Mr. Blackmar's (Inn run owned by Elisha Blackmar built in 1816)
17.65 - rock excavations
15.15 - Cairo
14.63 - Samuel Bennett's
14.00 - opposite Woodstock (Polulated Place in Cairo, NY).
13.60 - Road
12.73 - Bridge, 26 ft. over small stream
9.15 - Hay Press
8.23 - Winansville, now (East Durham)
7.58 - Hedges
6.09 - Bridge over Catskill Creek
5.40 - Bridge over Catskill Creek
4.80 - Opposite Tremain's tannery
4.50 - Mr. Stanard's
3.93 - Oak Hill Station
3.43 - Richardson's Mill
1.93 - Brown's Fulling Mill
.90 - Hands Tannery
.75 - Road to Potters Hollow
.49 - Cooksburg Depot
0 - 26 Chains north of Cooksburg Depot

The only known depiction of the railroad is Thomas Cole's River in the Catskills at the Museum of Fine Arts in Boston.

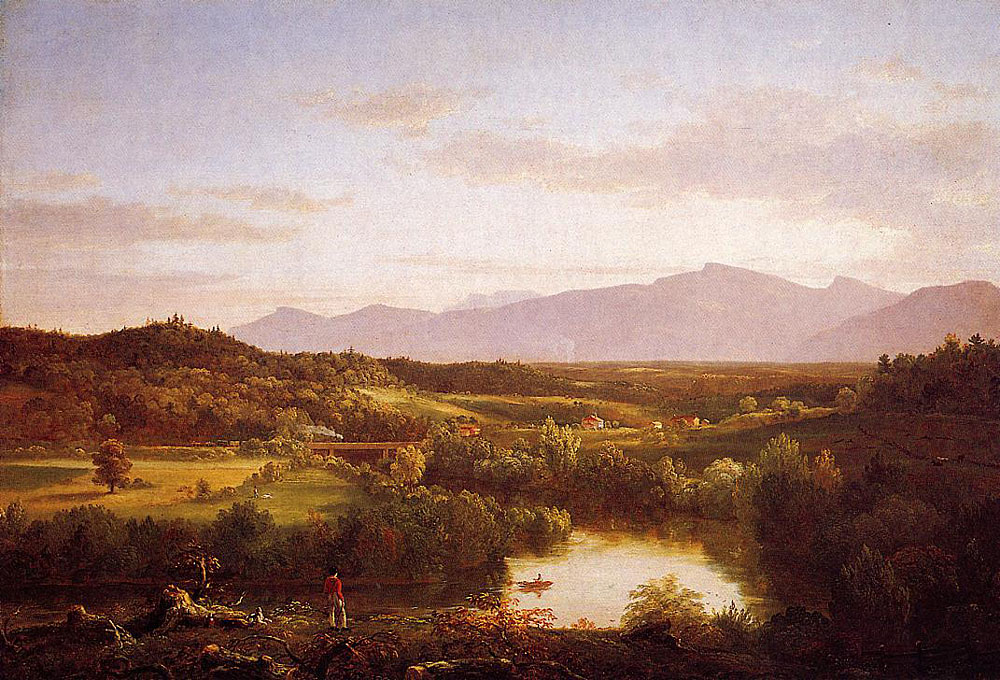
River in the Catskills
