= Jefferson Heights, New York =

- Census-designated place
- Location within New York Location within the United States
- Coordinates: 42°14′7″N 73°52′34″W
- Country: United States
- State: New York
- County: Greene
- Town: Catskill

Area
  - Total: 1.50 sq mi (3.88 km^{2})
  - Land: 1.47 sq mi (3.82 km^{2})
  - Water: 0.019 sq mi (0.05 km^{2})
- Elevation: 177 ft (54 m)

Population (2020)
  - Total: 1,122
  - Density: 760.6/sq mi (293.65/km^{2})
- Time zone: UTC-5 (Eastern (EST))
  - Summer (DST): UTC-4 (EDT)
- ZIP Codes: 12414 (Catskill); 12451 (Leeds)
- FIPS code: 36-38451
- GNIS feature ID: 0953961

Jefferson Heights is a hamlet and census-designated place (CDP) in Greene County, New York, United States. The population was 1,122 at the 2020 census.

The community of Jefferson Heights is in the town of Catskill, northwest of the village of Catskill. The building that once housed the community hospital is now a medical arts facility.

== Geography ==
Jefferson Heights is located in southeastern Greene County at 42°14′7″N 73°52′34″W (42.235394, -73.876021), in the northeastern part of the town of Catskill. It is bordered to the southeast by the village of Catskill and to the northwest by the hamlet of Leeds.

New York State Route 23 is a four-lane highway through the northern part of Jefferson Heights, leading east to the Rip Van Winkle Bridge over the Hudson River and northwest 8 miles (13 km) to Cairo. Interstate 87, the New York State Thruway, runs along the northwest border of Jefferson Heights, and Thruway Exit 21 (Cairo – Catskill - NY Route 23) is in the northern part of the CDP. Albany, the state capital, is 32 miles (51 km) to the north by the Thruway, and New York City is 121 miles (195 km) to the south.

According to the United States Census Bureau, the Jefferson Heights CDP has a total area of 1.5 square miles (3.9 km^{2}), of which 0.02 square miles (0.05 km^{2}), or 1.40%, is water. Catskill Creek, a tributary of the Hudson River, forms the southern and western edge of the CDP, and Hans Vosen Kill, a tributary of Catskill Creek, forms the eastern edge.

== Demographics ==
Historical population
Census	Pop.	Note	%±
2000	1,104		—
2010	1,094		−0.9%
2020	1,122		2.6%
U.S. Decennial Census

As of the census of 2000, there were 1,104 people, 382 households, and 241 families residing in the CDP. The population density was 752.3 inhabitants per square mile (290.5/km^{2}). There were 415 housing units at an average density of 282.8 per square mile (109.2/km^{2}). The racial makeup of the CDP was 95.74% White, 2.26% African American, 1.27% Asian, 0.09% from other races, and 0.63% from two or more races. Hispanic or Latino of any race were 1.00% of the population.

There were 382 households, out of which 23.3% had children under the age of 18 living with them, 50.8% were married couples living together, 8.6% had a female householder with no husband present, and 36.9% were non-families. 34.3% of all households were made up of individuals, and 15.7% had someone living alone who was 65 years of age or older. The average household size was 2.23 and the average family size was 2.80.

In the CDP, the population was spread out, with 16.1% under the age of 18, 4.8% from 18 to 24, 19.5% from 25 to 44, 19.8% from 45 to 64, and 39.8% who were 65 years of age or older. The median age was 55 years. For every 100 females, there were 69.6 males. For every 100 females age 18 and over, there were 66.8 males.

The median income for a household in the CDP was $43,750, and the median income for a family was $45,365. Males had a median income of $47,109 versus $22,031 for females. The per capita income for the CDP was $17,321. About 2.6% of families and 7.5% of the population were below the poverty line, including none of those under age 18 and 16.0% of those age 65 or over.
