= Leeds Dutch Reformed Church =

Historic church in New York, United States

- U.S. National Register of Historic Places
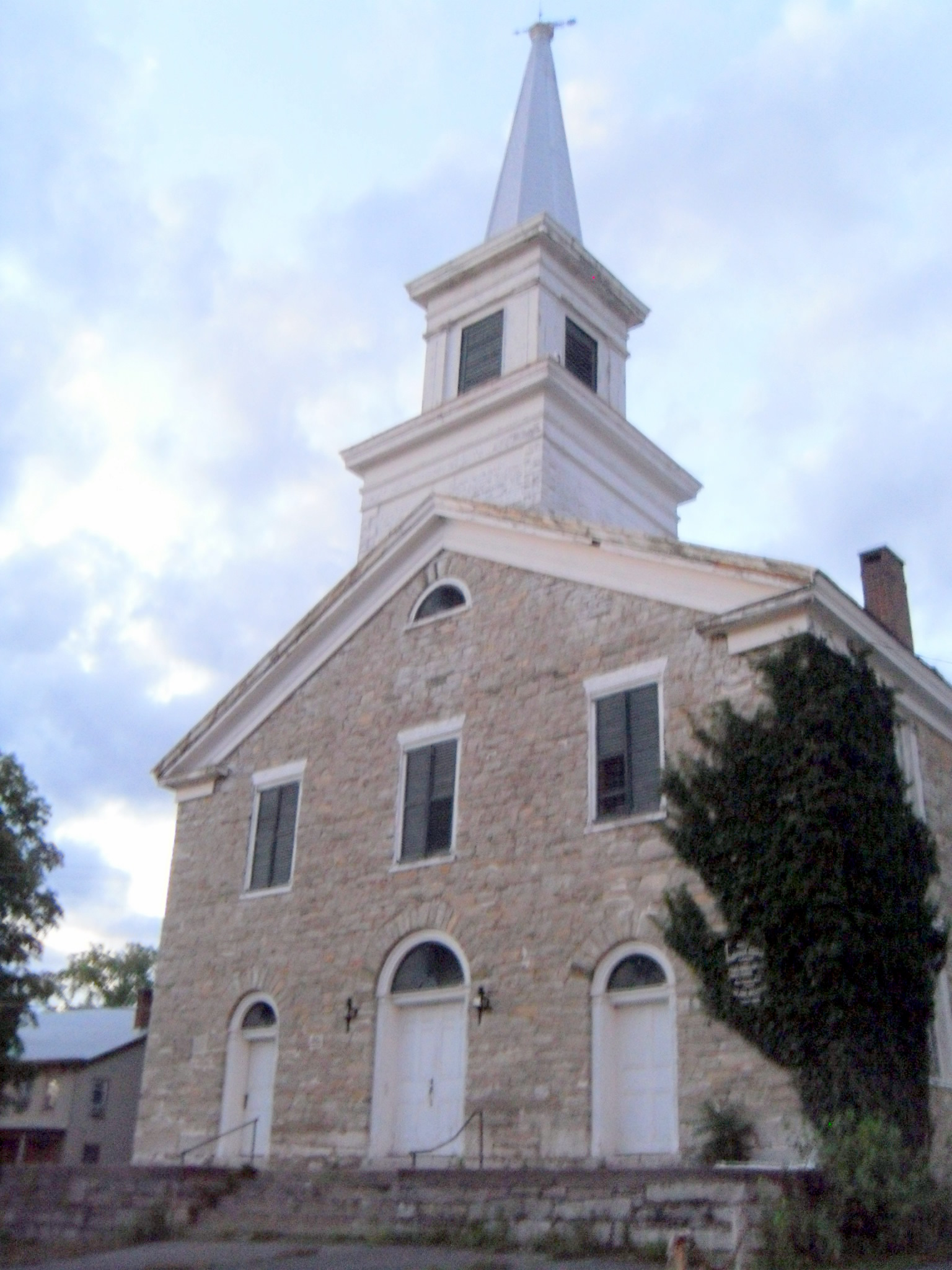
- Leeds Dutch Reformed Church, July 2010

- Location within New York Location within the United States
- Location: Co. Rt. 23B (Susquehanna Tpk.), Leeds, New York
- Coordinates: 42°15′17″N 73°54′4″W
- Area: less than one acre
- Built: ca. 1818
- Architectural style: Federal, Greek Revival
- NRHP reference No.: 96000141
- Added to NRHP: February 22, 1996

Leeds Dutch Reformed Church is a historic Dutch Reformed church on Co. Rt. 23B (Susquehanna Turnpike) in Leeds, Greene County, New York. It was built about 1818 and is a two-story, gable fronted stone church with restrained Federal / Greek Revival style features. It is rectangular in plan, three bays wide and four bays deep. It features a square, two stage belfry topped by an octagonal, metal shingle clad spire added about 1855.

It was added to the National Register of Historic Places in 1996.
