= Greenville, Greene County, New York =

- Town
- Location in Greene County and the state of New York
- Coordinates: 42°24′24″N 74°01′07″W
- Country: United States
- State: New York
- County: Greene

Government
  - Type: Town Council
  - Supervisor: Paul J. Macko (R)
  - Council: Members: • Greg Davis (C); • Richard Y. Bear (R); • Travis Richards (R); • John Benson (R)

Area
  - Total: 39.1 sq mi (101 km^{2})
  - Land: 38.9 sq mi (101 km^{2})
  - Water: 0.2 sq mi (0.52 km^{2})

Population (2020)
  - Total: 3,741
  - Density: 96.2/sq mi (37.1/km^{2})
- Time zone: UTC-5 (Eastern (EST))
  - Summer (DST): UTC-4 (EDT)
- ZIP Codes: 12083 (Greenville); 12176 (Surprise); 12431 (Freehold); 12042 (Climax); 12087 (Hannacroix); 12451 (Leeds)
- Website: towngreenvillegreenecony.gov

Greenville is a town on the northern border of Greene County, New York, United States. The population was 3,741 at the 2020 census. The town contains a hamlet also named Greenville.

== History ==
The area of the town was first settled circa 1774. The town was established in 1803 as "Greenfield" from the towns of Coxsackie and Durham. The adjoining town is "Freehold", just south of Greenville.

In 1810, the Greenville town population was 2,300, but by 1900 that figure had fallen to 1,362.

== Geography ==
According to the United States Census Bureau, the town has a total area of 39.1 square miles (101.3 km^{2}), of which 38.9 square miles (100.8 km^{2}) is land and 0.2 square miles (0.5 km^{2}), or 0.49%, is water.

The northern town line is the border of Albany County. The town is partly in the foothills of the Catskill Mountains.

== Demographics ==
Historical population
Census	Pop.	Note	%±
1820	2,374		—
1830	2,565		8.0%
1840	2,338		−8.8%
1850	2,242		−4.1%
1860	2,268		1.2%
1870	2,084		−8.1%
1880	2,043		−2.0%
1890	1,951		−4.5%
1900	1,651		−15.4%
1910	1,556		−5.8%
1920	1,362		−12.5%
1930	1,276		−6.3%
1940	1,477		15.8%
1950	1,613		9.2%
1960	1,879		16.5%
1970	2,279		21.3%
1980	2,849		25.0%
1990	3,135		10.0%
2000	3,316		5.8%
2010	3,739		12.8%
2020	3,741		0.1%
U.S. Decennial Census 2020

As of the census of 2000, there were 3,316 people, 1,345 households, and 918 families residing in the town. The population density was 85.2 inhabitants per square mile (32.9/km^{2}). There were 1,694 housing units at an average density of 43.5 per square mile (16.8/km^{2}). The racial makeup of the town was 96.95% White, 0.48% Black or African American, 0.15% Native American, 1.15% Asian, 0.27% from other races, and 1.00% from two or more races. Hispanic or Latino of any race were 1.63% of the population.

There were 1,345 households, out of which 30.8% had children under the age of 18 living with them, 55.5% were married couples living together, 9.0% had a female householder with no husband present, and 31.7% were non-families. 26.5% of all households were made up of individuals, and 12.3% had someone living alone who was 65 years of age or older. The average household size was 2.47 and the average family size was 3.01.

In the town, the population was spread out, with 25.1% under the age of 18, 5.4% from 18 to 24, 26.3% from 25 to 44, 25.0% from 45 to 64, and 18.2% who were 65 years of age or older. The median age was 41 years. For every 100 females, there were 95.1 males. For every 100 females age 18 and over, there were 94.1 males.

The median income for a household in the town was $38,423, and the median income for a family was $45,880. Males had a median income of $35,217 versus $25,216 for females. The per capita income for the town was $19,113. About 6.2% of families and 8.7% of the population were below the poverty line, including 14.7% of those under age 18 and 6.3% of those age 65 or over.

== Communities and locations in Greenville ==
- East Greenville – A hamlet east of Greenville hamlet on Route 26
- Freehold – A hamlet by the southern town line
- Gayhead – A hamlet at the eastern town line
- Greenville – A hamlet and census-designated place
- Greenville Center – A hamlet southeast of Greenville hamlet
- Newrys – A hamlet by the northern town line
- Norton Hill – A hamlet west of West Greenville on Route 81
- O'Hara's Corner – A location south of Norton Hill
- Place Corners – A location south of Greenville Center
- Result – A hamlet in the southeastern part of the town
- Sanfords Corner – A location south of East Greenville
- Surprise – A hamlet near the eastern town line
- West Greenville – A hamlet west of Greenville hamlet on Route 81

== Notable people ==
- William Bullock, inventor
- Ann Butler, painter
- Edwin Drake, the first American to successfully drill for oil
- Addison P. Jones, former New York State Senator
- Lyman Sanford, Adjutant General of New York, judge of Schoharie County, New York
