= Ann Butler (painter) =

American painter

Ann Butler (1813–1887) was an American tin painter. Her career represents one of the few artistic occupations felt to be suitable for young women during the 19th century.

Butler was the daughter of tinsmith Aaron Butler of Greenville, New York and his wife Sarah Cornell; she was the eldest of eleven, of whom nine survived to attend Greenville Academy. Ann may have learned to paint at this institution. From an early age she was familiar with most aspects of her father's business; she even accompanied him on business trips, traveling as far away as New York City. Family lore indicates that she was in charge of decorating tinware by the age of fourteen or fifteen. She went on to teach her sisters Minerva, Marilla, and Harriet to paint on tin as well, and their work is greatly similar to hers. Butler's work ceased upon her marriage, arranged by her father, to Eli Scutt, with whom she moved to Livingstonville, where she raised three children, and where she is buried. Her father's shop at Brandy Hill in Greenville, which had been active since around 1824, ceased production in around 1855.

Butler signed a number of her pieces with her full name; other works are marked with a heard-shaped device in which her initials are included. Thanks to this, it has been possible to identify certain stylistic characteristics of her work. Flowers are often painted in red, sometimes with blue; white paint is used to provide delineation. Fine ink work can be found in various places, and is sometimes used to build crosshatching. Decoration is dense, with various elements painted brightly against a dark background. One writer has described her style as "busy".

Numerous pieces by Butler survive in the collection of the American Folk Art Museum on the Upper West Side of Manhattan.
