= Zoom Flume =

Water park in East Durham, New York

- Interactive map of Zoom Flume
- Location: East Durham, New York, United States
- Coordinates: 42°22′45.5″N 074°08′43.5″W
- Opened: 6/17
- Closed: 9/4
- Operating season: June - September
- Pools: 4 pools
- Water slides: 9 water slides
- Website: Official website

Zoom Flume is a water park in East Durham, New York. Zoom Flume is named after Zoom Flume, the first ride built there. Zoom Flume consists of nine slides, five play areas, and three restaurants. Zoom Flume is opened to public from the end of June through Labor Day.

== Attractions ==
=== Slides ===
Zoom Flume has 9 slides which include:

- Typhoon Twister is the newest water slide and is an adrenaline pumping ride for 2 people starting high above the canyon, swirling around an enclosed bowl and splashing into a pool below.
- The Black Vortex is one of the more popular slides in the park. It consists of a dark tunnel in which riders go through in double tubes.
- The Wild River is a slide in which groups of up to 6 people get into a large raft, and go down a series of twists and turns.
- The Zoom Flume is a slide in which there are two "lanes", in which riders race each other, on mats, down a series of twists and turns, into a small splash pool.
- The Mighty Anaconda is a body slide in which riders go down without a raft. Riders exit in the Lagoon Activity Pool.
- Twin Tubing is a slide in which two riders go down a steep track. the track rises at the end, to stop the tubes.
- The Canyon Plunge is a slide in which riders go down a steep tube without a raft.
- The Grand Prix Splashway is a slide where three riders race each other down parallel tracks.
- Thrill Hill is a slide similar to The Grand Prix, except it is smaller and riders ride on tubes, instead of on their backs.

=== Play Areas and Other Attractions ===
Zoom Flume has five Play Areas which include:

- Riptide Cove Wave Pool- The park's newest water attraction which opened in 2010.
- The Lazy River is a lazy river encircling Pelican Pond. It goes under The Black Vortex, and Twin Tubing.
- Wild Water West Is a play area where guests shoot water at each other.
- The Lagoon Activity Pool is a pool located at the entrance of the park. It contains numerous water-spraying devices and a Tiki that sprays water at people.
- Pelican Pond is a small pool intended for children, which contains sprayers and a small

=== Food Stands ===
Zoom Flume has four food stands including:

- The River Grille is a food court in the middle of the park.
- The Pit Stop Snack Bar which is located next to the River Grille
- The Country Place Restaurant and Bar is located across the creek. It is next to the Wave Pool.
- Mama Jean's Pizza a pizza shack located next to the wavepool

== See also ==
- List of water parks
