= Acra, New York =

Hamlet in the state of New York, United States

- Hamlet
- Location within New York Location within the United States
- Coordinates: 42°18′39″N 74°03′19″W
- Country: United States
- State: New York
- County: Greene
- Elevation: 653 ft (199 m)
- Time zone: UTC-5 (Eastern (EST))
  - Summer (DST): UTC-4 (EDT)
- ZIP code: 12405
- Area codes: 518 & 838
- GNIS feature ID: 942155

Acra is a hamlet in Greene County, New York, United States. The community is located along New York State Route 23, 11.7 miles (18.8 km) west-northwest of Catskill. Acra has a post office with ZIP code 12405.
