= Cairo, New York =

- Town
- Location in Greene County and the state of New York
- Coordinates: 42°18′08″N 73°59′44″W
- Country: United States
- State: New York
- County: Greene
- Established: 1803

Government
  - Type: Town Council
  - Town Supervisor: Debra Bogins (R)
  - Town Council: Members: • Gary Warner Jr.; • Mary Jo-Cords; • Dan Joyce; • Douglas L. Ostrander, Jr.

Area
  - Total: 60.08 sq mi (155.61 km^{2})
  - Land: 59.83 sq mi (154.95 km^{2})
  - Water: 0.25 sq mi (0.66 km^{2})
- Elevation: 535 ft (163 m)

Population (2020)
  - Total: 6,644
  - Density: 111.1/sq mi (42.88/km^{2})
- Time zone: UTC-5 (EST)
  - Summer (DST): UTC-4 (EDT)
- ZIP Codes: 12413 (Cairo); 12405 (Acra); 12431 (Freehold); 12451 (Leeds); 12470 (Purling); 12473 (Round Top); 12482 (South Cairo); 12058 (Earlton)
- Area code: 518
- FIPS code: 36-11649
- GNIS feature ID: 978772
- Website: townofcairony.gov

Cairo /ˈkɛəroʊ/ is a town in Greene County, New York, United States. The population was 6,644 at the 2020 census. It is the third largest town in the county. The town is in the southern part of the county, partly in the Catskill Park. The town contains a hamlet, also named Cairo.

== History ==
The first European-American settler arrived around 1772, but many new families moved in after the American Revolution. They were coming west from New England.

In 1803, the town was formed from the towns of Catskill, Coxsackie, and Durham. First known as "Canton", the town was renamed in 1808 to "Cairo".

== Geography ==
According to the United States Census Bureau, the town has a total area of 60.1 square miles (156 km^{2}), of which 60.0 square miles (155 km^{2}) is land and 0.2 square miles (0.52 km^{2}), or 0.27%) is water.

Catskill Creek flows through the town.

== Demographics ==
Historical population
Census	Pop.	Note	%±
1820	2,353		—
1830	2,912		23.8%
1840	2,862		−1.7%
1850	2,831		−1.1%
1860	2,479		−12.4%
1870	2,283		−7.9%
1880	2,287		0.2%
1890	2,191		−4.2%
1900	2,176		−0.7%
1910	1,841		−15.4%
1920	1,487		−19.2%
1930	1,772		19.2%
1940	1,905		7.5%
1950	1,944		2.0%
1960	2,825		45.3%
1970	3,546		25.5%
1980	4,729		33.4%
1990	5,418		14.6%
2000	6,358		17.3%
2010	6,610		4.0%
2020	6,644		0.5%
U.S. Decennial Census 2020

As of the census of 2000, there were 6,355 people, 2,579 households, and 1,709 families residing in the town. The population density was 106.0 inhabitants per square mile (40.9/km^{2}). There were 3,322 housing units at an average density of 55.4 units per square mile (21.4 units/km^{2}). The racial makeup of the town was 96.87% White, 0.55% Black or African American, 0.33% Native American, 0.22% Asian, 0.60% from other races, and 1.43% from two or more races. Hispanic or Latino of any race were 3.67% of the population.

There were 2,579 households, out of which 29.9% had children under the age of 18 living with them, 51.6% were married couples living together, 10.3% had a female householder with no husband present, and 33.7% were non-families. 28.4% of all households were made up of individuals, and 14.0% had someone living alone who was 65 years of age or older. The average household size was 2.44 and the average family size was 3.00.

In the town, the population was spread out, with 25.2% under the age of 18, 6.2% from 18 to 24, 26.3% from 25 to 44, 25.1% from 45 to 64, and 17.3% who were 65 years of age or older. The median age was 40 years. For every 100 females, there were 93.8 males. For every 100 females age 18 and over, there were 90.1 males.

The median income for a household in the town was $35,995, and the median income for a family was $41,820. Males had a median income of $36,590 versus $25,538 for females. The per capita income for the town was $19,407. About 6.1% of families and 10.4% of the population were below the poverty line, including 10.3% of those under age 18 and 10.9% of those age 65 or over.

== Communities and locations in and near Cairo ==
- Acra – A hamlet west of Cairo hamlet on Route 23.
- Cairo – The hamlet and census-designated place of Cairo.
- Gayhead – A hamlet at the northern town line.
- Purling – A hamlet south of Cairo hamlet.
- Round Top – A hamlet southwest of Purling.
- South Cairo – A hamlet southeast of Cairo hamlet on Route 23.
- South Durham – A hamlet at the western town line.
- Freehold – A populated place north of Cairo on Route 32, along Catskill Creek.
- Cairo Fairgrounds – Home to the Greene County Fair from 1870 to 1936, the grounds continued to host harness racing for the next two decades. An endeavor to revive the facility with quarter-horse competition was abandoned when a racing license was denied in 1972. An attempt to introduce stock car racing in 1974 also failed after 6 weeks. The grandstand and judges' stand were torn down in the 1970s. (Note: Geolocation of Cairo Fairgrounds: 42.3048°N 74.0124°W)

== Public safety ==
Cairo has two fire companies: Cairo Fire District and Round Top Vol. Fire Co. Inc. Cairo Ambulance responds to medical emergencies in the town.

== Notable people ==
- Joseph Alden (1807–1885) – born in Cairo, academic and author of over seventy books
- David Brewster (1801–1876) – born in Cairo, U.S. Representative from New York
- Jennifer Connelly (born 1970) – born in Cairo, Academy Award-winning actress
- Jack Diamond (1897–1931) – bootlegger and gangster
- Robert Field (1804–1876) – born in Cairo, politician and businessman
- John Ashley Griswold (1822–1902) – born in Cairo, attorney, judge and politician
- Rob LeDonne (born 1987 in Brooklyn, NY) – attended Cairo-Durham Central Schools, writer for numerous TV shows and periodicals
- Charles Porter (1833–1897) – born in Cairo, U.S. Representative from Virginia
- Lorenzo Shepard (1821–1856) – born in Cairo, attorney and politician
- Thurlow Weed (1797–1882) – born in Cairo, newspaper editor and political boss who promoted, by turns (and sometimes simultaneously), the National Republican, Anti-Masonic, Whig and Republican parties
