= Surprise, New York =

Coordinates: 42°23′33″N 73°56′59″W

Surprise is a populated place in Greene County, New York, United States. In 2014, the population was 419.

== History ==
A post office called Surprise was established in 1889, and remained in operation until it was discontinued in 1988. Surprise has been noted for its unusual place name.
