= Rob LeDonne =

American writer for print and television (born 1987)

- Born: May 7, 1987 (age 39); Brooklyn, New York, U.S.
- Education: Hofstra University, The New School, Cairo-Durham Central School District
- Occupation: Writer
- Years active: 2009–present

Rob LeDonne is an American writer for television and print media. He has written comedy material for Late Night with Jimmy Fallon, The Tonight Show with Jay Leno, the MTV Video Music Awards, and the Teen Choice Awards.

He has also conducted interviews and written feature articles for The New York Times, Rolling Stone, Surfer, Nylon Guys, Paste, American Songwriter, and The Guardian.
