= Greenville (CDP), Greene County, New York =

Greenville, Greene County, New York
- Census-designated place
- Location within New York Location within the United States
- Coordinates: 42°24′55″N 074°01′19″W
- Country: United States
- State: New York
- County: Greene County
- Town: Greenville

Area
  - Total: 3.92 sq mi (10.16 km^{2})
  - Land: 3.88 sq mi (10.05 km^{2})
  - Water: 0.042 sq mi (0.11 km^{2})
- Elevation: 709 ft (216 m)

Population (2020)
  - Total: 688
  - Density: 177.3/sq mi (68.45/km^{2})
- Time zone: UTC-5 (Eastern (EST))
  - Summer (DST): UTC-4 (EDT)
- ZIP code: 12083
- Area code: 518
- FIPS code: 36-30609
- GNIS feature ID: 951773

Greenville is a hamlet and census-designated place (CDP) in the town of Greenville, in Greene County, New York, United States. The population of the CDP was 688 at the 2020 census, out of a total 3,741 people in the town as a whole.

== Geography ==
Greenville is located in northern Greene County at 42°24′55″N 074°01′19″W (42.4153596, -74.0220769), in the north-central part of the town of Greenville. Its elevation is 709 feet (216 m) above sea level.

New York State Route 32 passes through the center of the hamlet, leading northeast 26 miles (42 km) to Albany and south 10 miles (16 km) to Cairo. New York State Route 81 leads west from Greenville 10 miles (16 km) to Cooksburg.

According to the United States Census Bureau, the Greenville CDP has a total area of 3.452 square miles (8.94 km^{2}), of which 3.432 square miles (8.89 km^{2}) is land and 0.020 square miles (0.05 km^{2}), or 0.58%, is water.

== Demographics ==
Historical population
Census	Pop.	Note	%±
2000	493		—
2010	688		39.6%
2020	688		0.0%
U.S. Decennial Census

At the 2000 census, there were 493 people, 230 households and 138 families residing in the CDP. The population density was 142.9 inhabitants per square mile (55.2/km^{2}). There were 265 housing units at an average density of 76.8 per square mile (29.7/km^{2}). The racial makeup of the CDP was 98.99% White, 0.20% Black or African American, 0.20% Native American, and 0.61% from two or more races. Hispanic or Latino of any race were 0.81% of the population.

There were 230 households, of which 20.4% had children under the age of 18 living with them, 48.3% were married couples living together, 8.3% had a female householder with no husband present, and 39.6% were non-families. 36.5% of all households were made up of individuals, and 15.7% had someone living alone who was 65 years of age or older. The average household size was 2.14 and the average family size was 2.81.

19.9% of the population were under the age of 18, 3.9% from 18 to 24, 23.1% from 25 to 44, 27.8% from 45 to 64, and 25.4% who were 65 years of age or older. The median age was 47 years. For every 100 females, there were 88.9 males. For every 100 females age 18 and over, there were 86.3 males.

The median household income was $34,375, and the median family income was $39,261. Males had a median income of $29,792 versus $30,972 for females. The per capita income for the CDP was $19,815. About 13.6% of families and 21.7% of the population were below the poverty line, including 59.7% of those under age 18 and 5.1% of those age 65 or over.
