= Meeting House Hill (disambiguation) =

Meeting House Hill is a common place name. It may refer to:

- Meeting House Hill in Boston's Dorchester neighborhood
- Meeting House Hill, Delaware
- South Meetinghouse in Portsmouth, New Hampshire
- South Sutton Meeting House in South Sutton, New Hampshire
- Daddy Frye's Hill Cemetery in Methuen, Massachusetts
