= Cairo (CDP), New York =

Cairo, New York
- Census-designated place
- Location within New York Location within the United States
- Coordinates: 42°18′9″N 74°0′14″W
- Country: United States
- State: New York
- County: Greene
- Town: Cairo

Area
  - Total: 4.24 sq mi (10.97 km^{2})
  - Land: 4.23 sq mi (10.95 km^{2})
  - Water: 0.0077 sq mi (0.02 km^{2})
- Elevation: 374 ft (114 m)

Population (2020)
  - Total: 1,368
  - Density: 323.5/sq mi (124.91/km^{2})
- Time zone: UTC-5 (Eastern (EST))
  - Summer (DST): UTC-4 (EDT)
- ZIP Codes: 12413 (Cairo); 12470 (Purling)
- Area code: 518
- FIPS code: 36-11638
- GNIS feature ID: 0945440

Cairo is a hamlet and census-designated place (CDP) in the town of Cairo in Greene County, New York, United States. The population of the CDP was 1,368 at the 2020 census, out of 6,644 people in the entire town.

== Geography ==
The hamlet of Cairo is located in east-central Greene County at 42°18′9″N 74°0′13″W (42.302637, -74.003818), near the geographic center of the town of Cairo. New York State Route 23 curves through the northern part of the community, leading southeast 9 miles (14 km) to the Rip Van Winkle Bridge over the Hudson River at the village of Catskill, and west 16 miles (26 km) to Windham in the Catskill Mountains. New York State Route 32 joins NY 23 through the northeastern part of the hamlet of Cairo, leading north 10 miles (16 km) to Greenville and south 17 miles (27 km) to Saugerties. New York State Route 145 branches off Route 23 in the northern part of Cairo and leads northwest 30 miles (48 km) to Middleburgh.

According to the United States Census Bureau, the CDP has a total area of 4.2 square miles (11.0 km^{2}), of which 0.01 square miles (0.02 km^{2}), or 0.14%, is water. Catskill Creek, a tributary of the Hudson River, flows eastward along the northern edge of the CDP.

== Demographics ==
Historical population
Census	Pop.	Note	%±
2000	1,390		—
2010	1,402		0.9%
2020	1,368		−2.4%
U.S. Decennial Census

As of the census of 2000, there were 1,390 people, 600 households, and 361 families residing in the CDP. The population density was 327.1 inhabitants per square mile (126.3/km^{2}). There were 739 housing units at an average density of 173.9 per square mile (67.1/km^{2}). The racial makeup of the CDP was 94.60% White, 0.94% Black or African American, 0.43% Native American, 0.22% Asian, 1.44% from other races, and 2.37% from two or more races. Hispanic or Latino of any race were 6.62% of the population.

There were 600 households, out of which 27.3% had children under the age of 18 living with them, 42.5% were married couples living together, 13.7% had a female householder with no husband present, and 39.8% were non-families. 33.8% of all households were made up of individuals, and 16.2% had someone living alone who was 65 years of age or older. The average household size was 2.29 and the average family size was 2.93.

In the CDP, the population was spread out, with 24.9% under the age of 18, 6.4% from 18 to 24, 26.1% from 25 to 44, 23.6% from 45 to 64, and 19.0% who were 65 years of age or older. The median age was 40 years. For every 100 females, there were 85.1 males. For every 100 females age 18 and over, there were 80.0 males.

The median income for a household in the CDP was $28,478, and the median income for a family was $34,063. Males had a median income of $36,250 versus $26,042 for females. The per capita income for the CDP was $17,465. About 5.6% of families and 13.2% of the population were below the poverty line, including none of those under age 18 and 28.3% of those age 65 or over.
