= South Cairo, New York =

- Hamlet and CDP
- Location within New York Location within the United States
- Coordinates: 42°16′37″N 73°57′24″W
- Country: United States
- State: New York
- County: Greene
- Elevation: 200 ft (61 m)

Population (2020)
  - Total: 590
- Time zone: UTC-5 (Eastern (EST))
  - Summer (DST): UTC-4 (EDT)
- ZIP code: 12482
- Area codes: 518 & 838
- GNIS feature ID: 965717

South Cairo is a hamlet (and census-designated place). It has 590 people, as of the 2020 census. It is situated in Greene County, New York, United States. The community is located along Catskill Creek and New York State Route 23, 6.3 miles (10.1 km) northwest of Catskill.

South Cairo has a post office with ZIP code 12482.
