= Hensonville, New York =

- Hamlet
- Location within New York Location within the United States
- Coordinates: 42°17′23″N 74°13′00″W
- Country: United States
- State: New York
- County: Greene
- Town: Windham
- Elevation: 1,637 ft (499 m)
- Time zone: UTC-5 (Eastern (EST))
  - Summer (DST): UTC-4 (EDT)
- ZIP code: 12439
- Area code: 518
- GNIS feature ID: 952612

Hensonville is a hamlet in the town of Windham, Greene County, United States. The zipcode is: 12439. The hamlet is the setting of Windham Town Hall, located at 371 NY-296, Hensonville, NY 12439.
