= Purling, New York =

- Hamlet
- Location within New York Location within the United States
- Coordinates: 42°17′03″N 74°00′19″W
- Country: United States
- State: New York
- County: Greene
- Elevation: 482 ft (147 m)
- Time zone: UTC-5 (Eastern (EST))
  - Summer (DST): UTC-4 (EDT)
- ZIP code: 12470
- Area codes: 518 & 838
- GNIS feature ID: 961997

Purling is a hamlet in Greene County, New York, United States. The community is 8.6 miles (13.8 km) west-northwest of Catskill. Purling had a post office from September 7, 1894, until December 24, 2005; it still has its own ZIP code, 12470.
