= East Durham, New York =

- Hamlet and CDP
- Nickname: Emerald Isle of the Catskills
- Location within New York Location within the United States
- Coordinates: 42°22′21″N 74°05′44″W
- Country: United States
- State: New York
- County: Greene
- Town: Durham
- Elevation: 535 ft (163 m)
- Time zone: UTC-5 (EST)
  - Summer (DST): UTC-4 (EDT)
- ZIP Codes: 12423 (East Durham); 12413 (Cairo)
- Area code: 518
- GNIS feature ID: 959100

East Durham is a hamlet (and census-designated place) within the town of Durham, which is located in the U.S. state of New York, approximately 535 feet (163 m) above sea level, in Greene County. As of the 2020 census, East Durham had a population of 466. It has the ZIP Code 12423 and the area code 518. It is an Irish town where many Irish immigrants and vacationers visit often.

== Attractions ==
East Durham is known for its Irish heritage and cultural promotion. The town attracts many Irish-American visitors. East Durham contains several significant cultural attractions including:

The Shamrock House - a restaurant/inn/bar in the center of East Durham. Center of activities within the town and is a popular location for concerts and events.

- Zoom Flume — full service water park with many slides, rides, and pools designed for families.
- Woodward Road Stone Arch Bridge — historical bridge listed on the National Register of Historic Places.
- Supersonic Speedway — Mini Amusement park with miniature golf, go-karts, batting cages and arcade.
- Gavin's Golden Hill House — resort built at the original site of the Full Moon Farm, founded in the 1790s.
- Michael J. Quill Irish Cultural & Sports Center — Cultural Center containing a Baseball Field, a traditional Irish Thatched Cottage, and the World's Largest Map Of Ireland.

== Events ==
- East Durham Irish Festival - held annually on Memorial Day weekend, with three stages of performances of traditional and contemporary Irish music.
- Catskills Irish Arts Week - an annual week-long summer program in traditional Irish music, song, dance and arts, for children, teens and adults.
