= Windham (town), New York =

Windham, New York
- Town
- Nicknames: "Land in the Sky", "The Heart of the Catskills", "Gem of the Catskills"
- Location in Greene County and the state of New York
- Coordinates: 42°18′57″N 74°13′25″W
- Country: United States
- State: New York
- County: Greene

Government
  - Type: Town Council
  - Town Supervisor: Thomas Hoyt
  - Town Council: Members' List: • Thomas Hoyt (R); • Wayne E. Van Valin (R); • Stephen J. Walker (R); • Ian Peters (R); • Kurt Goettsche

Area
  - Total: 45.34 sq mi (117.42 km^{2})
  - Land: 45.20 sq mi (117.07 km^{2})
  - Water: 0.14 sq mi (0.35 km^{2})
- Elevation: 1,893 ft (577 m)

Population (2020)
  - Total: 1,708
- Time zone: UTC-5 (Eastern (EST))
  - Summer (DST): UTC-4 (EDT)
- ZIP Codes: 12496 (Windham); 12439 (Hensonville); 12454 (Maplecrest)
- Area code: 518
- FIPS code: 36-039-82480
- GNIS feature ID: 0979648
- Website: www.townofwindhamny.com

Windham is a town in Greene County, New York, United States. The population was 1,708 at the 2020 census. The town was probably named for the town or county of Windham, Connecticut, as many of its earliest settlers came from that state as well as other parts of New England. The town has two nicknames: "Land in the Sky" and "Gem of the Catskills".

Windham is in the west-central part of the county on the northern boundary of the Catskill Park.

== History ==
The region was first settled around 1780. The town was formed from the town of Woodstock in 1798 while still part of Ulster County. After the formation of Greene County, several other towns were formed from parts of Windham. These towns include Hunter and Lexington (1813), Prattsville (1833), and part of Ashland in 1848. In 1900, the town's population was 1,240.

In 1937, Camp Highland, a Nazi summer camp for German-American boys, ran at a site near Windham.

The major source of income in Windham is the Windham Mountain ski resort, formerly called "Ski Windham". The resort receives many of its skiers from greater New York City and from other areas in the American Northeast. In August 2010, Windham hosted the 2010 World Cup Mountain Bike Race, the first time its finals took place on American soil in 20 years of competition. In August 2014, Windham again hosted the World Cup Mountain Bike Race, as the only US stop of the UCI Mountain Bike World Cup.

In August 2011, Hurricane Irene dumped more than 10 inches of rain into Batavia Kill creek in just two hours in a devastating flood.

== Geography ==
According to the United States Census Bureau, the town has a total area of 45.4 square miles (117.6 km^{2}), of which 45.3 square miles (117.3 km^{2}) is land and 0.1 square miles (0.3 km^{2}, or 0.22%) is water.

The town is in the Catskill Mountains and partly within the Catskill State Park. Batavia Kill, a tributary of Schoharie Creek, flows to the west through Windham.

=== Climate ===
Climate data for Windham, New York
Month	Jan	Feb	Mar	Apr	May	Jun	Jul	Aug	Sep	Oct	Nov	Dec	Year
Record high °F (°C)	63 (17)	70 (21)	83 (28)	89 (32)	89 (32)	90 (32)	94 (34)	95 (35)	88 (31)	83 (28)	75 (24)	68 (20)	95 (35)
Mean daily maximum °F (°C)	31 (−1)	33 (1)	41 (5)	53 (12)	65 (18)	73 (23)	78 (26)	76 (24)	68 (20)	58 (14)	46 (8)	35 (2)	55 (13)
Mean daily minimum °F (°C)	9 (−13)	9 (−13)	18 (−8)	29 (−2)	39 (4)	47 (8)	51 (11)	50 (10)	43 (6)	33 (1)	26 (−3)	15 (−9)	31 (−1)
Record low °F (°C)	−27 (−33)	−18 (−28)	−19 (−28)	8 (−13)	22 (−6)	28 (−2)	35 (2)	32 (0)	22 (−6)	17 (−8)	−2 (−19)	−16 (−27)	−27 (−33)
Average precipitation inches (mm)	4.28 (109)	2.86 (73)	4.44 (113)	4.67 (119)	4.82 (122)	4.28 (109)	4.17 (106)	3.50 (89)	4.61 (117)	4.46 (113)	5.17 (131)	4.09 (104)	51.35 (1,305)
Source: The Weather Channel

== Demographics ==
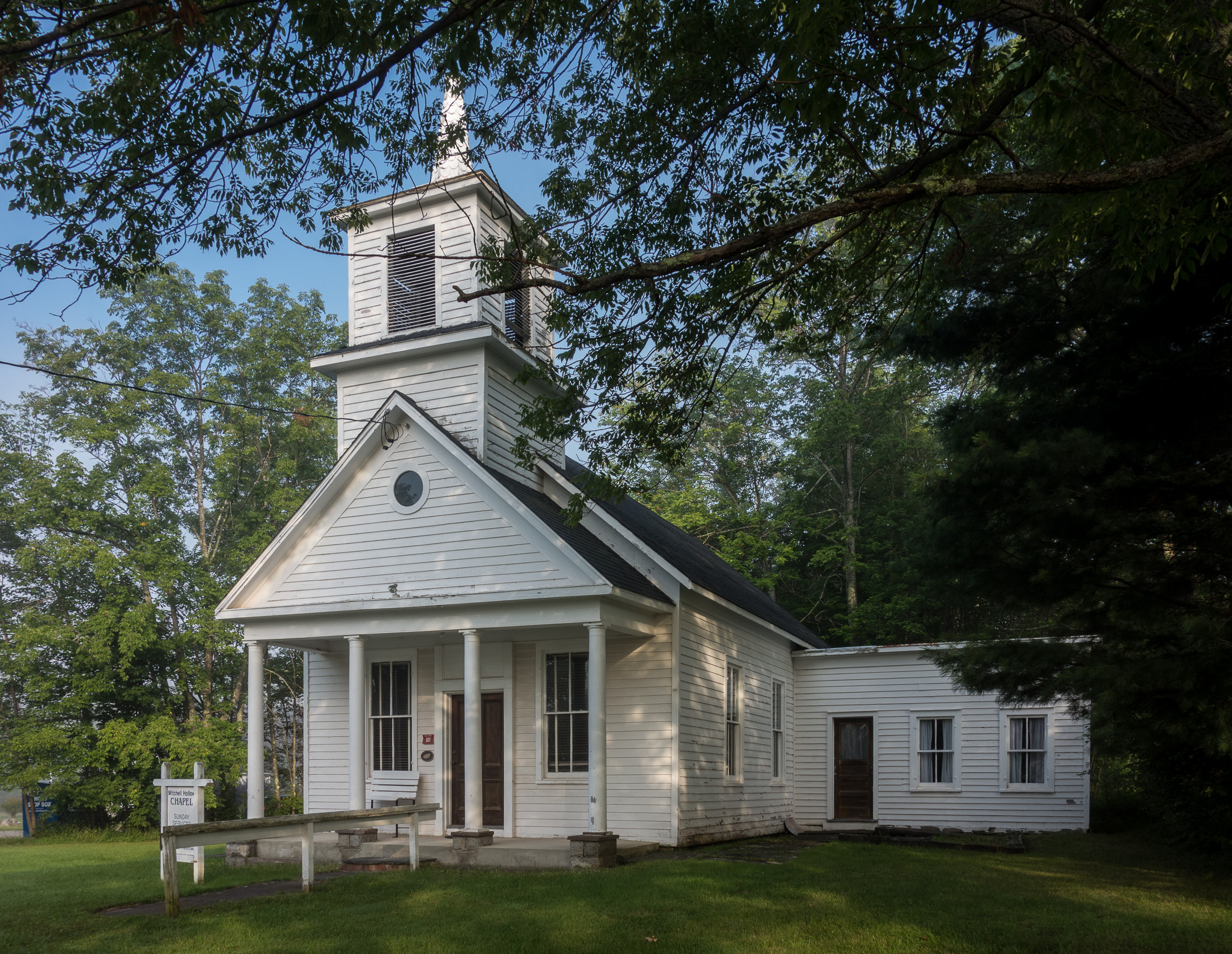
Mitchell Hollow Mission Church in Windham

Historical population
Census	Pop.	Note	%±
1820	2,536		—
1830	3,472		36.9%
1840	2,417		−30.4%
1850	2,048		−15.3%
1860	1,650		−19.4%
1870	1,485		−10.0%
1880	1,461		−1.6%
1890	1,503		2.9%
1900	1,387		−7.7%
1910	1,438		3.7%
1920	1,246		−13.4%
1930	1,269		1.8%
1940	1,269		0.0%
1950	1,360		7.2%
1960	1,289		−5.2%
1970	1,190		−7.7%
1980	1,663		39.7%
1990	1,682		1.1%
2000	1,660		−1.3%
2010	1,703		2.6%
2020	1,708		0.3%
U.S. Decennial Census 2020

As of the census of 2000, there were 1,660 people, 720 households, and 450 families residing in the town. The population density was 36.7 inhabitants per square mile (14.2/km^{2}). There were 2,002 housing units at an average density of 44.2 per square mile (17.1/km^{2}). The racial makeup of the town was 98.13% White, 0.36% Black or African American, 0.42% Native American, 0.06% Asian, 0.42% from other races, and 0.60% from two or more races. Hispanic or Latino of any race were 1.75% of the population.

There were 720 households, out of which 26.5% had children under the age of 18 living with them, 50.8% were married couples living together, 9.2% had a female householder with no husband present, and 37.4% were non-families. 32.1% of all households were made up of individuals, and 13.5% had someone living alone who was 65 years of age or older. The average household size was 2.31 and the average family size was 2.94.

In the town, the population was spread out, with 23.5% under the age of 18, 4.9% from 18 to 24, 23.1% from 25 to 44, 29.2% from 45 to 64, and 19.3% who were 65 years of age or older. The median age was 44 years. For every 100 females, there were 92.1 males. For every 100 females age 18 and over, there were 92.7 males.

The median income for a household in the town was $36,010, and the median income for a family was $42,961. Males had a median income of $31,726 versus $23,125 for females. The per capita income for the town was $22,344. About 6.8% of families and 9.3% of the population were below the poverty line, including 5.8% of those under age 18 and 7.9% of those age 65 or over.

== Communities and locations in the Town of Windham ==
- Batavia Kill − A stream flowing through the southern part of the town past Maplecrest and Windham.
- Brooksburg − A hamlet in the Catskill Park.
- East Windham − A hamlet on the eastern town line on Route 23.
- Hensonville − A hamlet in the southern part of the town and the location of the town government. It was named after John Henson, a postmaster, having been called previously "Baileys Four Corners."
- Mitchell Hollow − A location in the town.
- Nauvoo − A location in the town.
- North Settlement − A hamlet on the western town line, northwest of Windham village.
- Maplecrest − A hamlet in the Catskill Park near the southern town line, originally called "Big Hollow."
- Windham − The hamlet of Windham in the southwestern part of the town on Route 23. It was originally called "Batavia" until that name was taken for a location in Genesee County, New York circa 1802. It was also called "Windham Centre" and "Osbornville."

== Notable people ==
- Daniel Steele, Holiness Methodist minister and theologian, born in Windham
- Scott Adams, writer of the Dilbert comic strip, grew up in Windham and graduated as the valedictorian from Windham-Ashland-Jewett Central School
- Charles John Brown, appointed archbishop of the Roman Catholic Church on November 26, 2011, and currently serving as apostolic nuncio to Ireland; moved to Windham at the age of 11 with his parents and five siblings
- James K. Edsall, Illinois state senator and Illinois attorney general, born in Windham
- Oscar Finch, Wisconsin state assemblyman born in Windham
- Hiram P. Graham, Wisconsin state assemblyman born in Windham
- Washington Hunt, governor of New York, born in Windham

== In popular culture ==
- In 2018, Windham appeared in the Netflix original series Daredevil. In the season 3 episode "Karen", it represented Fagan Corners, Vermont, the fictional hometown of Karen Page (Deborah Ann Woll). The town hall was rebranded with new signage, a local diner was used as a diner owned by Karen's father (Lee Tergesen), and additional filming was conducted at the nearby ski areas and country club.
