= Greene County, New York =

County in New York, United States

- County
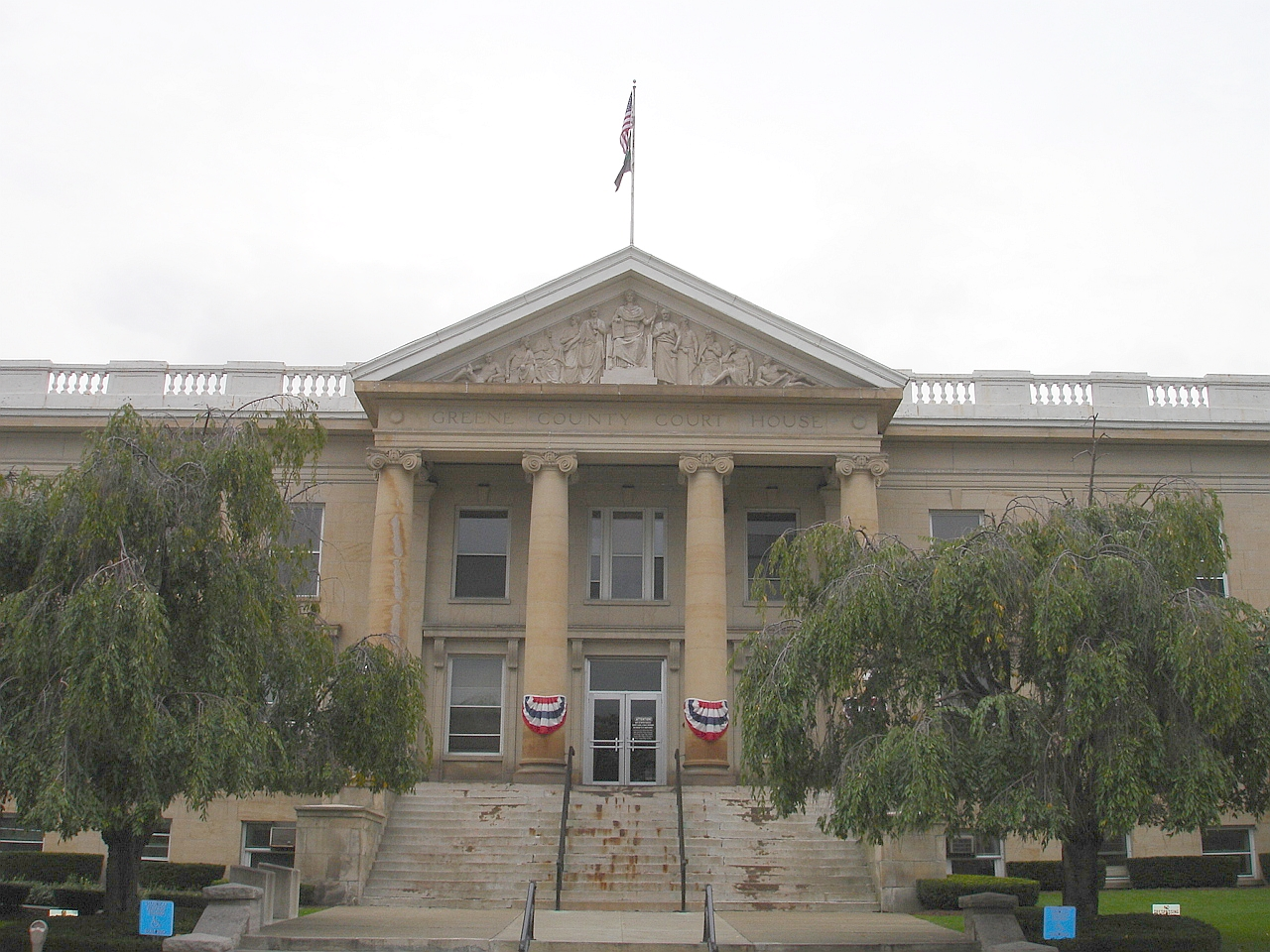
- The Greene County Court House in Catskill, NY

- Flag Seal

- Location within the U.S. state of New York
- Coordinates: 42°17′N 74°08′W
- Country: United States
- State: New York
- Founded: March 3, 1800
- Named for: Nathanael Greene
- Seat: Catskill
- Largest village: Catskill

Area
  - Total: 658 sq mi (1,700 km^{2})
  - Land: 647 sq mi (1,680 km^{2})
  - Water: 11 sq mi (28 km^{2}) 1.7%

Population (2020)
  - Total: 47,931
  - Estimate (2025): 47,238 ▼
  - Density: 74.1/sq mi (28.6/km^{2})
- Time zone: UTC−5 (Eastern)
  - Summer (DST): UTC−4 (EDT)
- Congressional district: 19th
- Website: greenecountyny.gov

Greene County is a county located in the U.S. state of New York. As of the 2020 census, the population was 47,931. Its county seat is Catskill. The county's name is in honor of the American Revolutionary War general Nathanael Greene. The county is part of the Capital District region of the state.

== History ==
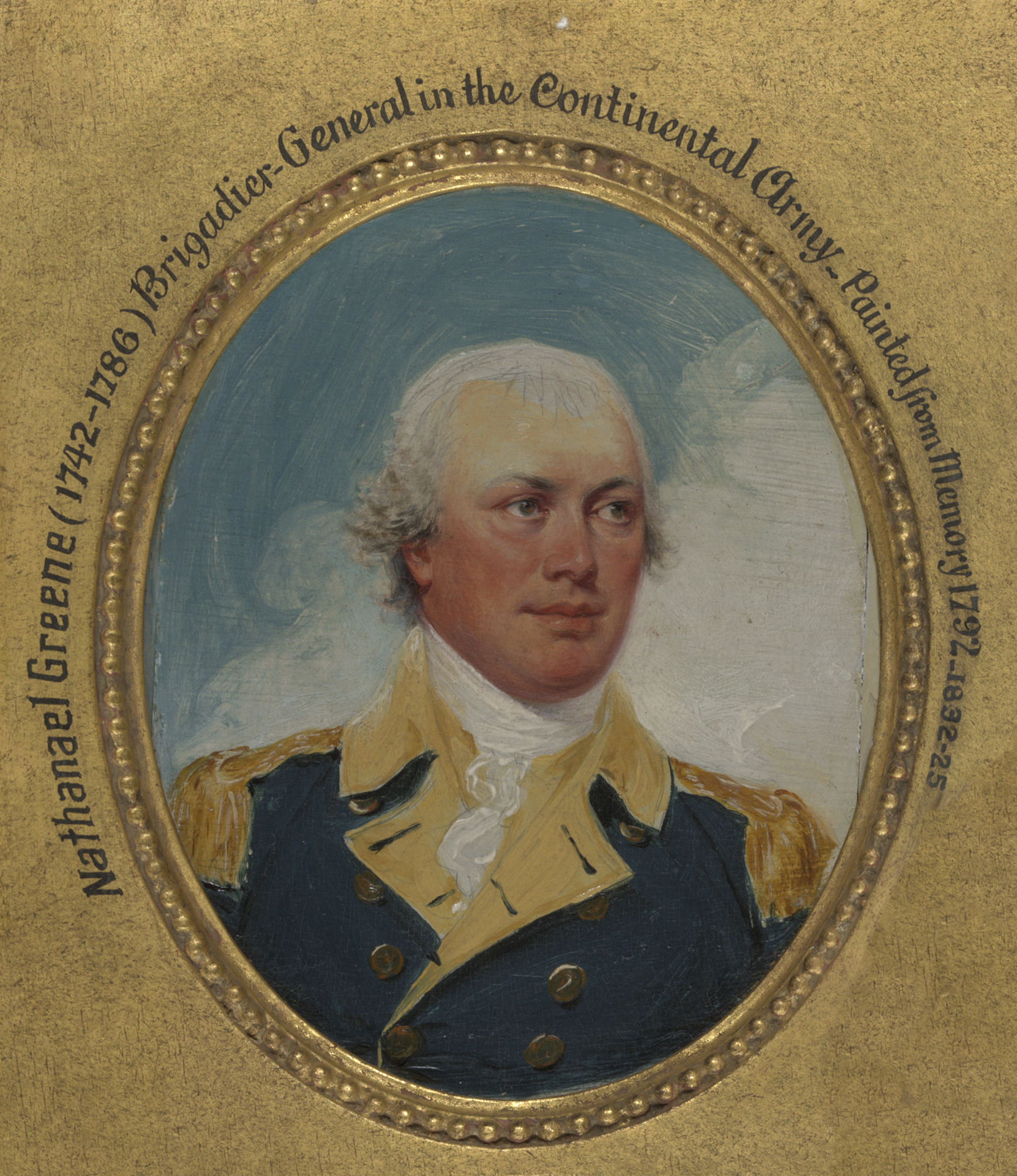
Nathanael Greene, commander in the Southern Campaign of the Revolutionary War and namesake of Greene County.

On March 25, 1800, Greene County was created by the partitioning of Albany (360 square miles) and Ulster (270 square miles) counties, producing a county of 630 square miles (1,600 km^{2}).

On April 3, 1801, 90 square miles (230 km^{2}) of land was transferred from Delaware and Ulster counties, raising the total area to 720 square miles (1,900 km^{2}). This transferred Prattsville, Vly Mountain, Halcott Center, Bushnellsville, Highmount, Shandaken, Lanesville, and Pine Hill within Greene County.

On May 26, 1812, Greene County lost 20 square miles (52 km^{2}) to Ulster County, lowering the total area to 690 square miles (1,800 km^{2}), reassigning Pine Hill, Highmount, and Shandaken to Ulster County.

On April 15, 1814, the county borders were re-surveyed, and the line adjusted with no change in area.

On April 17, 1822, the border was again surveyed, with no change in area, but Palenville was found to be inside Greene County.

On April 23, 1823, the border was again resurveyed, and the Hudson River border with Columbia County realigned accordingly.

On March 3, 1836, 30 square miles (78 km^{2}) of area was lost to Schoharie County, reducing the total area to 660 square miles (1,700 km^{2}), and reassigning Manorkill, producing the Greene County that exists today.

== Geography ==
According to the U.S. Census Bureau, the county has a total area of 658 square miles (1,700 km^{2}), of which 647 square miles (1,680 km^{2}) is land and 11 square miles (28 km^{2}) (1.7%) is water. Greene County is located in southeast central New York State, just west of the Hudson River and south of Albany.

The northern and eastern regions are mostly low-lying flatlands. Along the Hudson River the lowest elevation is at sea level. The southern and western areas rise sharply into the Catskill Mountains.

Catskill Park takes up much of the south central region. The park contains some of the tallest peaks south of the Adirondacks. For example, the highest elevation is Hunter Mountain, at approximately 4,040 feet (1,230 m) above sea level; In addition, there are many picturesque waterfalls in the park such as the famed, Kaaterskill Falls.

The entirety of Greene County is in the 19th Congressional District, and is represented by Democrat Josh Riley.

The county is served by Greene County Transit, based in Catskill.

=== Adjacent counties ===
- Albany County - north
- Rensselaer County - northeast
- Columbia County - east
- Ulster County - south
- Delaware County - west
- Schoharie County - northwest

=== National protected area ===
- Thomas Cole National Historic Site

== Demographics ==
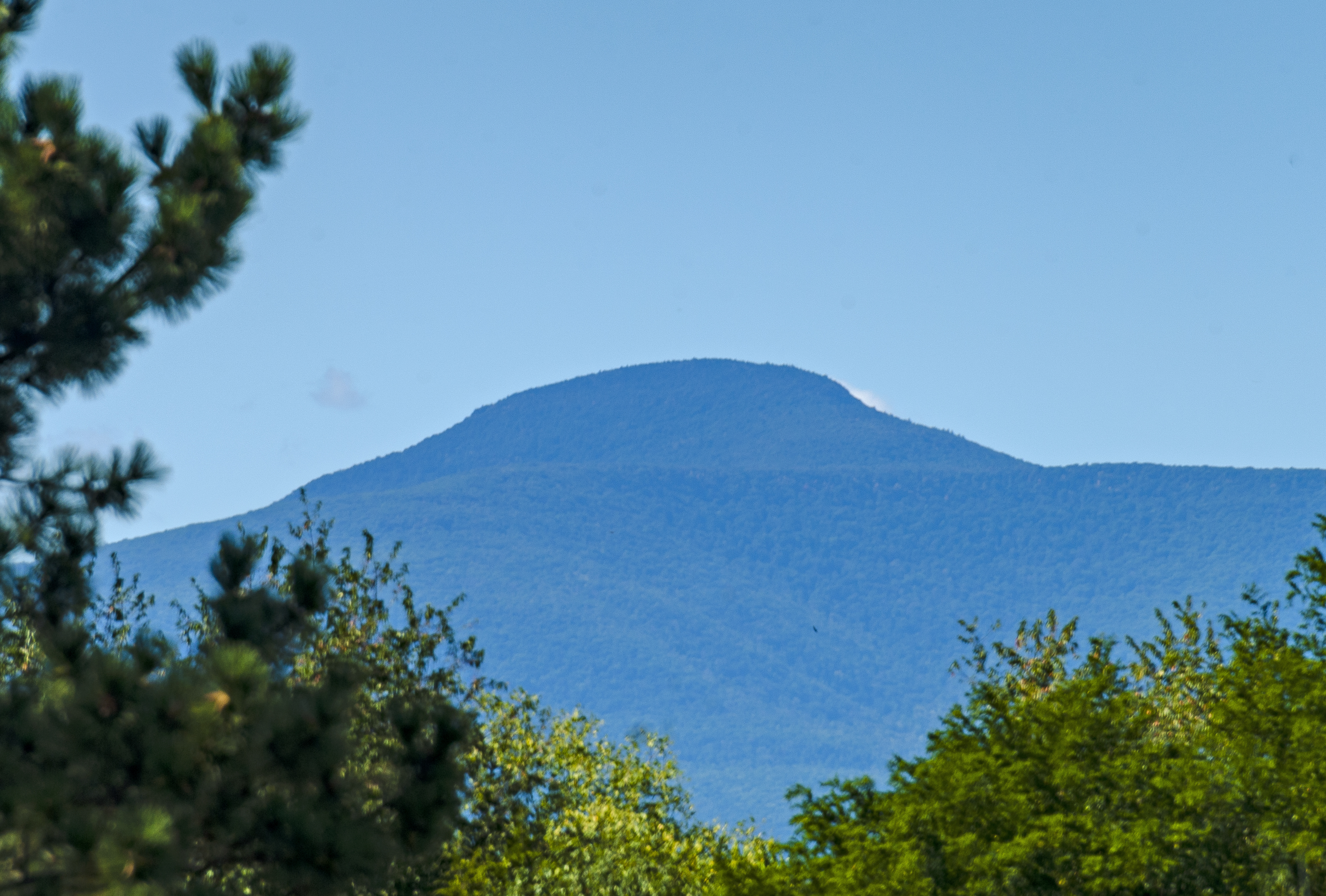
Kaaterskill High Peak in the Town of Hunter

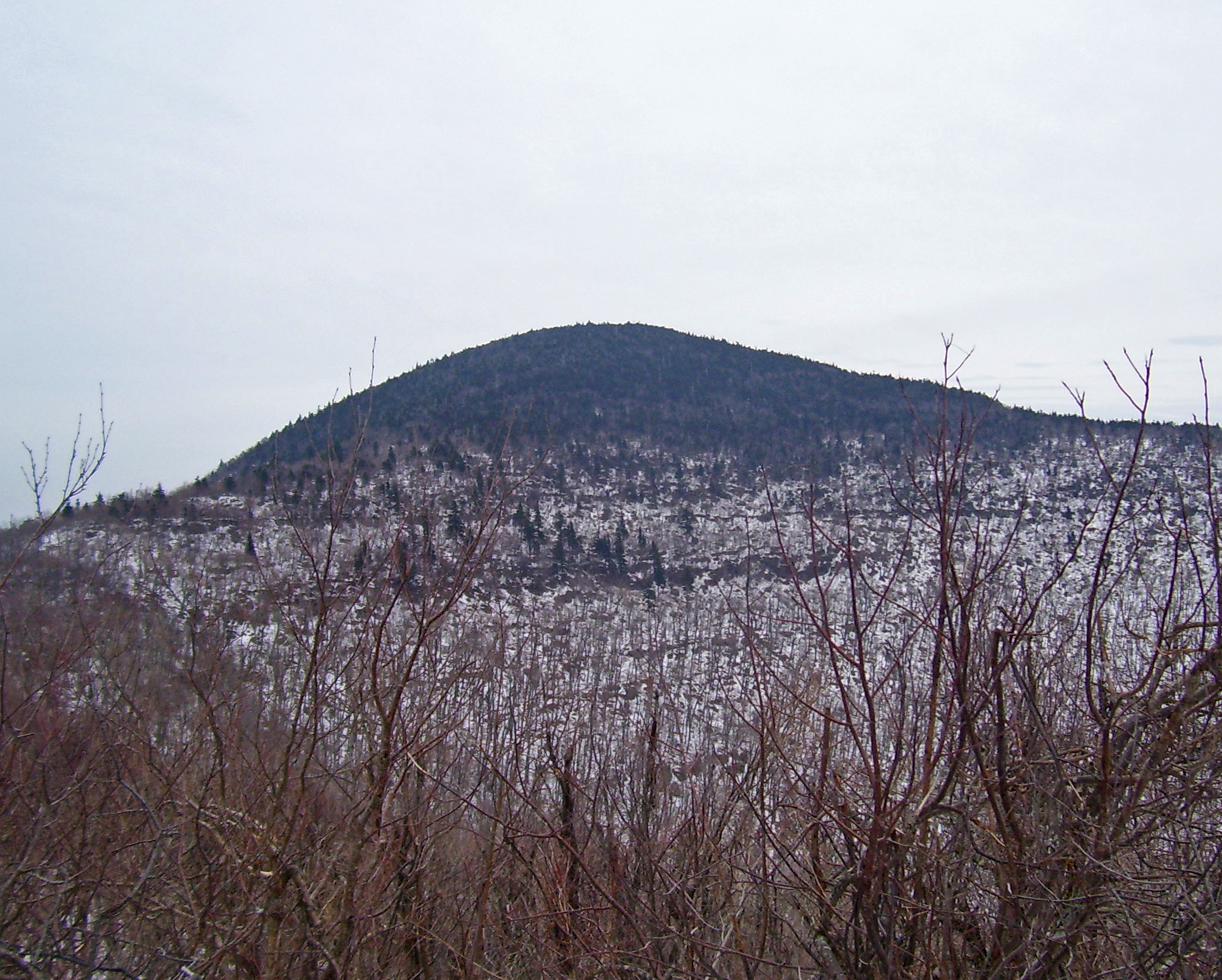
Thomas Cole Mountain in Greene County.

Historical population
Census	Pop.	Note	%±
1800	12,584		—
1810	19,536		55.2%
1820	22,996		17.7%
1830	29,525		28.4%
1840	30,446		3.1%
1850	33,126		8.8%
1860	31,930		−3.6%
1870	31,832		−0.3%
1880	32,695		2.7%
1890	31,598		−3.4%
1900	31,478		−0.4%
1910	30,214		−4.0%
1920	25,796		−14.6%
1930	25,808		0.0%
1940	27,926		8.2%
1950	28,745		2.9%
1960	31,372		9.1%
1970	33,136		5.6%
1980	40,861		23.3%
1990	44,739		9.5%
2000	48,195		7.7%
2010	49,221		2.1%
2020	47,931		−2.6%
2025 (est.)	47,238	▼	−1.4%
U.S. Decennial Census; 1790-1960 1900-1990; 1990-2000 2010-2020

|estyear=2023 |estimate=47062 |estref=

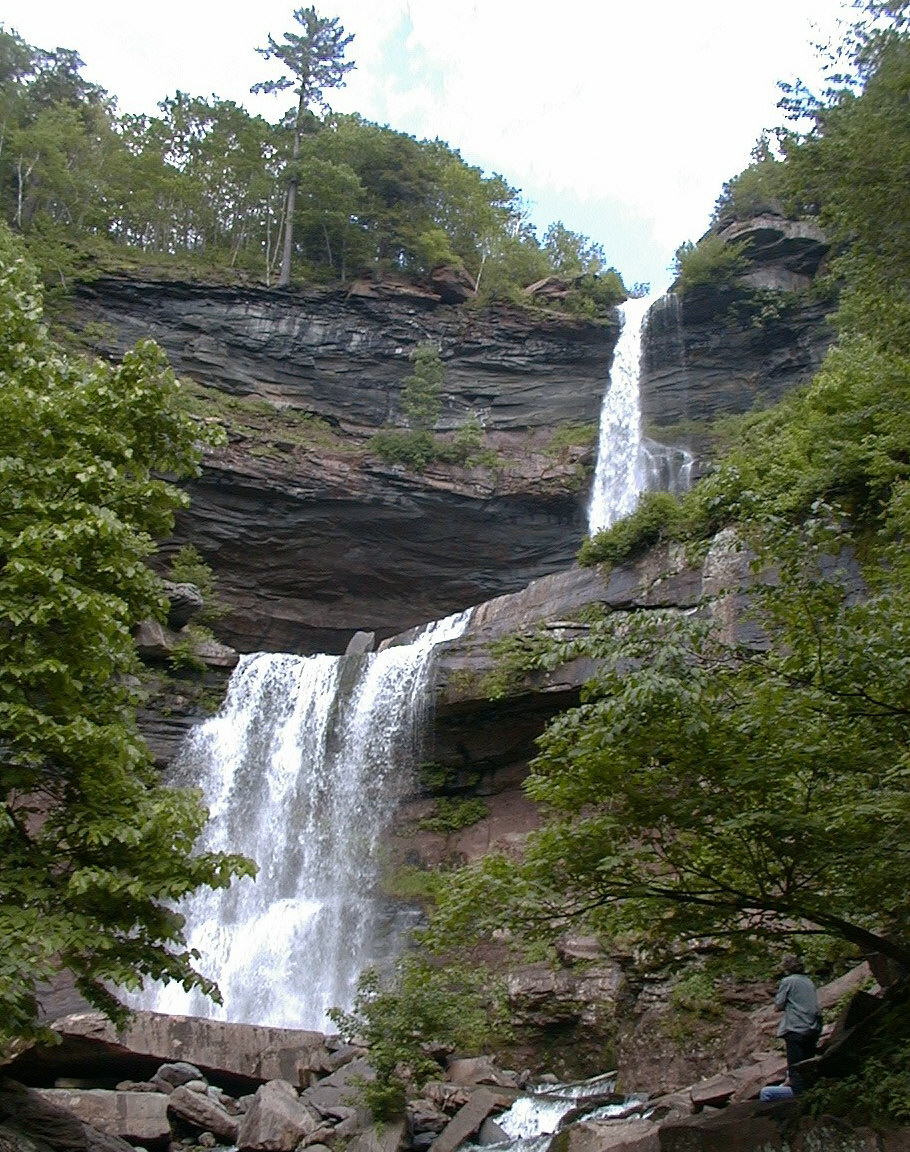
Kaaterskill Falls is in Greene County

=== 2020 census ===
Greene County, New York – Racial and ethnic composition Note: the US Census treats Hispanic/Latino as an ethnic category. This table excludes Latinos from the racial categories and assigns them to a separate category. Hispanics/Latinos may be of any race.
Race / Ethnicity (NH = Non-Hispanic)	Pop 1980	Pop 1990	Pop 2000	Pop 2010	Pop 2020	% 1980	% 1990	% 2000	% 2010	% 2020
White alone (NH)	38,902	40,902	42,640	42,857	39,494	95.21%	91.42%	88.47%	87.07%	82.40%
Black or African American alone (NH)	1,205	1,977	2,518	2,606	2,159	2.95%	4.42%	5.22%	5.29%	4.50%
Native American or Alaska Native alone (NH)	67	112	119	122	100	0.16%	0.25%	0.25%	0.25%	0.21%
Asian alone (NH)	65	178	254	382	500	0.16%	0.40%	0.53%	0.78%	1.04%
Native Hawaiian or Pacific Islander alone (NH)	x	x	7	15	3	x	x	0.01%	0.03%	0.01%
Other race alone (NH)	62	48	47	103	238	0.15%	0.11%	0.10%	0.21%	0.50%
Mixed race or Multiracial (NH)	x	x	535	717	2,328	x	x	1.11%	1.46%	4.86%
Hispanic or Latino (any race)	560	1,522	2,075	2,419	3,109	1.37%	3.40%	4.31%	4.91%	6.49%
Total	40,861	44,739	48,195	49,221	47,931	100.00%	100.00%	100.00%	100.00%	100.00%

=== 2000 census ===
As of the census of 2000, there were 48,195 people, 18,256 households, and 12,067 families residing in the county. The population density was 74 inhabitants per square mile (29/km^{2}). There were 26,544 housing units at an average density of 41 units per square mile (16/km^{2}). The racial makeup of the county was 90.76% White, 5.53% Black or African American, 0.28% Native American, 0.54% Asian, 0.02% Pacific Islander, 1.52% from other races, and 1.36% from two or more races. 4.31% of the population were Hispanic or Latino of any race. 18.8% were of Irish, 17.8% Italian, 17.5% German, 8.6% American and 6.9% English ancestry according to Census 2000. 92.3% spoke English, 2.8% Spanish, 1.5% German and 1.3% Italian as their first language.

There were 18,256 households, out of which 29.2% had children under the age of 18 living with them, 51.2% were married couples living together, 10.3% had a female householder with no husband present, and 33.9% were non-families. 27.9% of all households were made up of individuals, and 12.2% had someone living alone who was 65 years of age or older. The average household size was 2.42 and the average family size was 2.97.

In the county, the population was spread out, with 23.00% under the age of 18, 9.5% from 18 to 24, 27.0% from 25 to 44, 24.8% from 45 to 64, and 15.7% who were 65 years of age or older. The median age was 39 years. For every 100 females there were 106.5 males. For every 100 females age 18 and over, there were 108.2 males.

The median income for a household in the county was $36,493, and the median income for a family was $43,854. Males had a median income of $35,598 versus $25,346 for females. The per capita income for the county was $18,931. About 8.6% of families and 12.2% of the population were below the poverty line, including 15.7% of those under age 18 and 10.4% of those age 65 or over.

As of the 2010 census, the racial makeup of the county was 90.3% White, 5.7% African American, 0.3% Native American and 0.8% Asian. Hispanic or Latino people of any race were 4.9% of the population.

== Politics ==
United States presidential election results for Greene County, New York
Year	Republican		Democratic		Third party(ies)	
Year	No.	%	No.	%	No.	%
1884	4,167	47.56%	4,152	47.39%	442	5.05%
1888	4,460	48.27%	4,494	48.64%	286	3.10%
1892	3,914	47.63%	3,771	45.89%	532	6.47%
1896	4,540	53.46%	3,688	43.43%	264	3.11%
1900	4,395	49.32%	4,269	47.90%	248	2.78%
1904	4,527	52.27%	3,845	44.39%	289	3.34%
1908	4,191	50.42%	3,711	44.64%	411	4.94%
1912	2,711	36.29%	3,647	48.82%	1,113	14.90%
1916	3,649	49.06%	3,622	48.70%	167	2.25%
1920	6,323	61.50%	3,498	34.02%	461	4.48%
1924	7,503	61.56%	3,951	32.42%	734	6.02%
1928	9,529	66.71%	4,440	31.08%	316	2.21%
1932	7,334	51.43%	6,794	47.64%	133	0.93%
1936	9,060	56.41%	6,744	41.99%	256	1.59%
1940	10,153	61.10%	6,425	38.67%	38	0.23%
1944	9,807	65.10%	5,231	34.73%	26	0.17%
1948	10,566	66.52%	4,955	31.20%	362	2.28%
1952	12,907	74.07%	4,504	25.85%	15	0.09%
1956	14,262	78.91%	3,811	21.09%	0	0.00%
1960	11,878	64.84%	6,441	35.16%	1	0.01%
1964	7,842	43.82%	10,034	56.07%	18	0.10%
1968	10,954	60.87%	5,499	30.56%	1,544	8.58%
1972	14,313	72.96%	5,260	26.81%	45	0.23%
1976	11,370	59.02%	7,740	40.18%	154	0.80%
1980	11,286	57.88%	6,488	33.28%	1,724	8.84%
1984	14,150	70.50%	5,858	29.19%	62	0.31%
1988	11,874	61.46%	7,265	37.61%	180	0.93%
1992	9,390	44.31%	6,924	32.67%	4,877	23.01%
1996	8,712	43.29%	8,251	41.00%	3,161	15.71%
2000	11,332	53.72%	8,480	40.20%	1,283	6.08%
2004	12,996	58.02%	8,933	39.88%	469	2.09%
2008	12,059	53.99%	9,850	44.10%	426	1.91%
2012	11,174	54.06%	9,030	43.69%	464	2.25%
2016	13,073	59.29%	7,405	33.58%	1,572	7.13%
2020	14,271	56.64%	10,346	41.07%	577	2.29%
2024	14,702	57.79%	10,436	41.02%	302	1.19%

Greene County is considered a Republican stronghold. It was one of only eleven counties in New York that did not vote for Bill Clinton in 1996, a strong year for Democrats. It supported John McCain by a margin just under ten points in 2008 over Barack Obama, another Democratic year. In 2012, 54.1 percent of the county's voters chose Republican challenger Mitt Romney, and 43.7 percent chose Democratic incumbent Obama, despite it being again a Democratic year. In 2016, 59 percent of the county's voters chose Donald Trump while 34 percent chose Hillary Clinton. It has not supported a Democrat for president since 1964, and before that it previously did so in 1912.

In some elections, certain towns in Greene County have had a plurality that have voted Democratic, though the county remains very Republican.

== Communities ==
=== Towns ===
- Ashland
- Athens
- Cairo
- Catskill
- Coxsackie
- Durham
- Greenville
- Halcott
- Hunter
- Jewett
- Lexington
- New Baltimore
- Prattsville
- Windham

=== Villages ===
- Athens
- Catskill (county seat)
- Coxsackie
- Hunter
- Tannersville

=== Census-designated places ===
- Cairo
- Cementon
- East Durham
- Greenville
- Haines Falls
- Jefferson Heights
- Leeds
- New Baltimore
- Palenville
- Prattsville
- Round Top
- Sleepy Hollow Lake
- South Cairo
- West Kill
- Windham

=== Hamlets ===
- Acra
- Cornwallville
- Climax
- Earlton
- Freehold
- Haines Falls
- Hannacroix
- Hensonville
- Lanesville
- Maplecrest
- Oak Hill
- Surprise

== Notable people ==
- John Adams, (1778–1854), born in Oak Hill, United States Congressman
- Levi Hill, claimed early inventor of color photography
- Jeff "The Drunk" Curro Howard Stern Wack Packer
- Blossom Dearie, (1924-2009), jazz singer
- John B. Terry, (1796-1874), pioneer, merchant, soldier, and Wisconsin territorial legislature, born in Coxsackie
- Thurlow Weed, (1797-1882), born in Acra, NY. Newspaper publisher, politician, and party boss
- Edwin L. Drake, (1819-1880), invented method to drill oil from the ground, born in Greenville
- Scott Adams, born and raised in Windham, NY; an American cartoonist, creator of the Dilbert comic strip and the author of several nonfiction works of satire, commentary, business, and general speculation.

== See also ==
- List of counties in New York
- National Register of Historic Places listings in Greene County, New York
