= Catskill (village), New York =

Catskill, New York
- Village
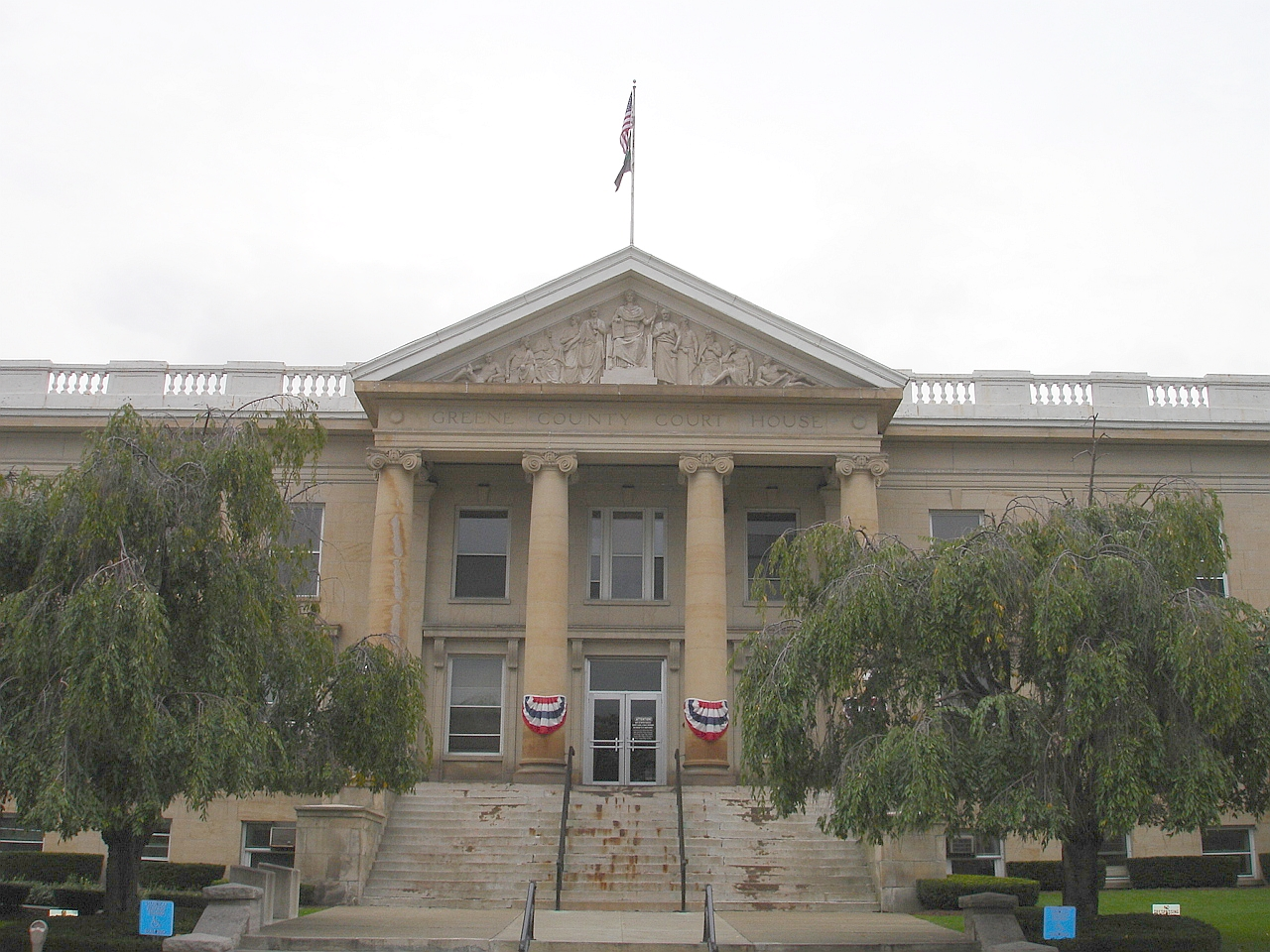
- Greene County Court House

- Seal

- Location within New York Location within the United States
- Coordinates: 42°13′3″N 73°51′53″W
- Country: United States
- State: New York
- County: Greene
- Town: Catskill
- Incorporated: 1806

Government
  - Clerk-Treasurer: Anna Signoretti

Area
  - Total: 2.86 sq mi (7.40 km^{2})
  - Land: 2.28 sq mi (5.90 km^{2})
  - Water: 0.58 sq mi (1.50 km^{2})
- Elevation: 43 ft (13 m)

Population (2020)
  - Total: 3,745
  - Density: 1,642.9/sq mi (634.31/km^{2})
- Time zone: UTC-5 (Eastern (EST))
  - Summer (DST): UTC-4 (EDT)
- ZIP code: 12414
- Area code: 518
- FIPS code: 36-13002
- GNIS feature ID: 0946061
- Website: villageofcatskillny.gov

Catskill is a village and county seat of Greene County, New York, United States. The population was 3,745 at the 2020 census, down from 4,081 at the 2010 census, down from 4,392 in 2000. The village is in the northeastern part of the town of Catskill.

== History ==
Most of the village land was purchased from the natives in 1684. At the end of the American Revolution there were only ten houses in the community.

The village was incorporated in 1806. Catskill is one of only twelve villages in New York still incorporated under a charter, the other villages having been incorporated or reincorporated under the provisions of state village law.

Martin van Buren was married in the village. John Adams, congressman from New York, died here.

== Geography ==
Catskill is located in eastern Greene County at 42°13′N 73°52′W (42.2187, -73.8668), in the northeastern part of the town of Catskill. The village is on the west side of the Hudson River, where Catskill Creek joins it.

New York State Route 385 passes through the center of the village as Bridge Street and Spring Street, ending in the western part of the village at an intersection with U.S. Route 9W. Route 385 crosses Route 23 at the northern border of the village and continues northeast 4 miles (6 km) to Athens and 10 miles (16 km) to Coxsackie. US 9W passes through the western part of Catskill village as Maple Avenue, leading north 17 miles (27 km) to Ravena and south 11 miles (18 km) to Saugerties. NY Route 23 crosses the northern corner of Catskill village, crossing the Hudson on the Rip Van Winkle Bridge into the town of Greenport, and leading west 2 miles (3 km) to Interstate 87 (the New York State Thruway) at Exit 21.

Greene County Transit, the bus system of Greene County, has its hub in Catskill.

According to the United States Census Bureau, the village has a total area of 2.9 square miles (7.4 km^{2}), of which 2.3 square miles (5.9 km^{2}) is land and 0.58 square miles (1.5 km^{2}), or 20.26%, is water.

== Demographics ==
Historical population
Census	Pop.	Note	%±
1870	3,701		—
1880	4,320		16.7%
1890	4,920		13.9%
1900	5,484		11.5%
1910	5,296		−3.4%
1920	4,728		−10.7%
1930	5,082		7.5%
1940	5,429		6.8%
1950	5,392		−0.7%
1960	5,825		8.0%
1970	5,317		−8.7%
1980	4,718		−11.3%
1990	4,690		−0.6%
2000	4,392		−6.4%
2010	4,081		−7.1%
2020	3,745		−8.2%
U.S. Decennial Census

As of the census of 2010, there were 4,081 people, 1,565 households, and 1,026 families residing in the village. The population density was 1,962.0 (2000) people per square mile (757.0 per km^{2}). There were 2,048 housing units at an average density of 914.9 per square mile (2002) (353.0 per km^{2}). The racial makeup of the village was 60.4% White, 30.73% Black or African American, .39% Native American, .61% Asian, .02% Pacific Islander, 2.48% from other races, and 3.37% from two or more races. Hispanic or Latino of any race were 7.22 (4% Mexican) of the population.

There were 1,765 households, out of which 29.8% had children under the age of 18 living with them, 38.9% were married couples living together, 18.3% had a female householder with no husband present, and 37.6% were non-families. 31.2% of all households were made up of individuals, and 12.9% had someone living alone who was 65 years of age or older. The average household size was 2.39 and the average family size was 2.99.

In the village, the population was spread out, with 25.5% under the age of 18, 8.2% from 18 to 24, 26.7% from 25 to 44, 22.2% from 45 to 64, and 17.5% who were 65 years of age or older. The median age was 37 years. For every 100 females, there were 89.0 males. For every 100 females age 18 and over, there were 85.5 males.

The median income for a household in the village was $28,075, and the median income for a family was $34,635. Males had a median income of $32,857 versus $21,578 for females. The per capita income for the village was $15,169. About 16.6% of families and 19.0% of the population were below the poverty line, including 29.1% of those under age 18 and 9.9% of those age 65 or over.

== Politics ==
Voters in Catskill tend to be slightly more liberal than the rest of Greene County's voters. It is somewhat of a battleground area but it has emerged Democratic by small margins in many of the past elections. Greene County itself remains solidly Republican.

== Notable people ==
Notable current and former residents of Catskill include:

- Mickey Brantley, Major League Baseball player with the Seattle Mariners and batting coach for several MLB teams
- Thomas Cole, 19th-century painter
- Jennifer Connelly, actress
- George Q. Daley, molecular and stem cell research scientist; dean of Harvard Medical School
- George Decker, general and Chief of Staff of the United States Army during the Kennedy Administration, was born in Catskill
- John Hill, represented New Jersey's 4th congressional district from 1867 to 1873, and New Jersey's 5th congressional district from 1881 to 1883
- Jacob Hopewell, 19th-century inventor
- John Addison Porter, professor and namesake of a cash prize at Yale
- Zachary Cole Smith, frontman of indie rock band DIIV
- Mike Tyson, former boxing heavyweight champion

== See also ==
- East Side Historic District (Catskill, New York)
