= Leeds, New York =

- Census-designated place
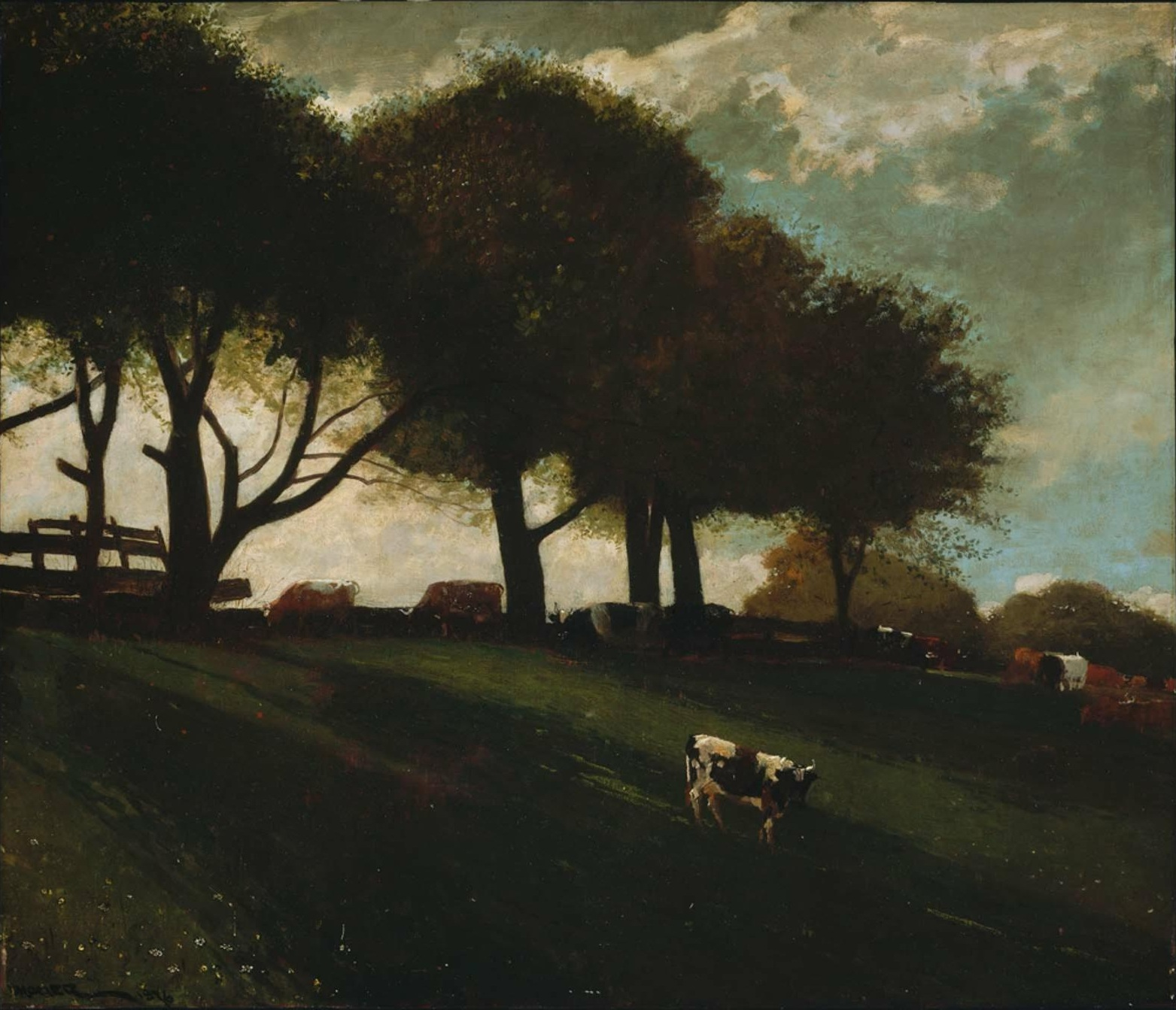
- Winslow Homer's 1876 painting Twilight at Leeds, New York.

- Location within New York Location within the United States
- Coordinates: 42°15′17″N 73°54′3″W
- Country: United States
- State: New York
- County: Greene
- Town: Catskill

Area
  - Total: 0.93 sq mi (2.42 km^{2})
  - Land: 0.92 sq mi (2.39 km^{2})
  - Water: 0.0077 sq mi (0.02 km^{2})
- Elevation: 157 ft (48 m)

Population (2020)
  - Total: 429
  - Density: 464.6/sq mi (179.39/km^{2})
- Time zone: UTC-5 (Eastern (EST))
  - Summer (DST): UTC-4 (EDT)
- ZIP Codes: 12451 (Leeds); 12414 (Catskill)
- Area code: 518
- FIPS code: 36-41784
- GNIS feature ID: 0955168

Leeds is a hamlet and census-designated place (CDP) in Greene County, New York, United States. The population was 429 at the 2020 census.

Leeds is located in the town of Catskill, near the northern town line. The community is located north of Route 23 and west of the New York State Thruway (Interstate 87) and is northwest of the village of Catskill.

== Geography ==
Leeds is located in eastern Greene County at 42°15′12″N 73°53′48″W (42.253466, -73.896634), on the north side of Catskill Creek. The center of the hamlet overlooks Mill Pond, a widening of the creek.

According to the United States Census Bureau, the CDP has a total area of 0.54 square miles (1.4 km^{2}), of which 0.01 square miles (0.02 km^{2}), or 1.74%, is water.

== History ==
Leeds was also known as "Madison" and "Mill Village", and in the local Native American language the area was known as Pasqoecq. It is named after Leeds, United Kingdom.

== Demographics ==
Historical population
Census	Pop.	Note	%±
2000	369		—
2010	377		2.2%
2020	429		13.8%
U.S. Decennial Census

As of the census of 2000, there were 369 people, 174 households, and 92 families residing in the CDP. The population density was 709.1 inhabitants per square mile (273.8/km^{2}). There were 222 housing units at an average density of 426.6 per square mile (164.7/km^{2}). The racial makeup of the CDP was 92.14% White, 4.61% African American, 0.27% Native American, 1.36% from other races, and 1.63% from two or more races. Hispanic or Latino of any race were 7.59% of the population.

There were 174 households, out of which 21.3% had children under the age of 18 living with them, 37.4% were married couples living together, 10.9% had a female householder with no husband present, and 47.1% were non-families. 37.4% of all households were made up of individuals, and 17.8% had someone living alone who was 65 years of age or older. The average household size was 2.12 and the average family size was 2.77.

In the CDP, the population was spread out, with 19.2% under the age of 18, 9.2% from 18 to 24, 32.8% from 25 to 44, 20.1% from 45 to 64, and 18.7% who were 65 years of age or older. The median age was 38 years. For every 100 females, there were 83.6 males. For every 100 females age 18 and over, there were 80.6 males.

The median income for a household in the CDP was $41,719, and the median income for a family was $51,250. Males had a median income of $48,167 versus $25,208 for females. The per capita income for the CDP was $31,187. About 8.4% of families and 7.7% of the population were below the poverty line, including none of those under age 18 and 16.9% of those age 65 or over.
