= List of county routes in Greene County, New York =

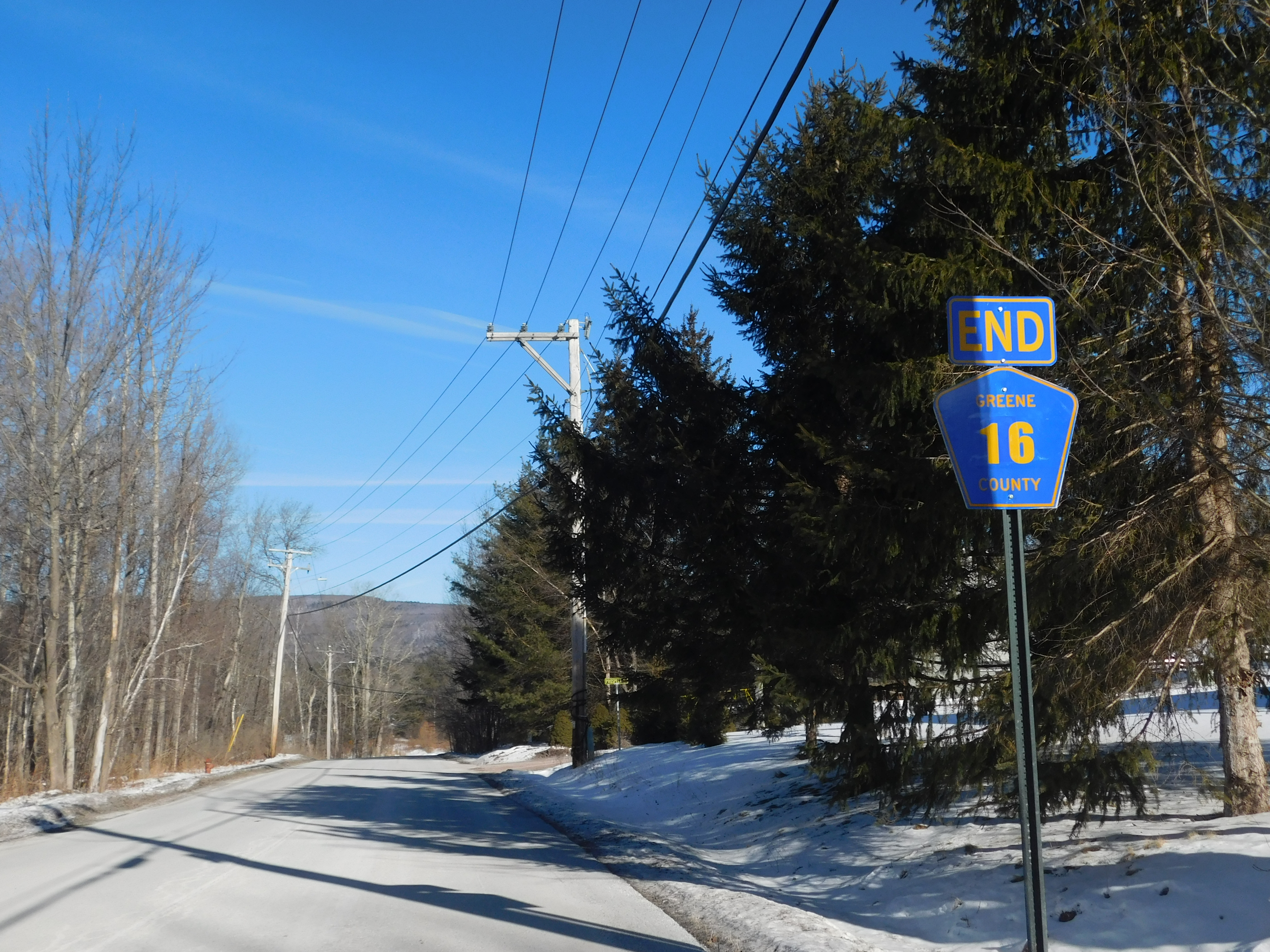
- The current standard route marker for county routes in Greene County at the end of County Route 16 at the Tannersville village line.

Highway names
- Interstates: Interstate X (I-X)
- US Highways: U.S. Route X (US X)
- State: New York State Route X (NY X)
- County: County Route X (CR X)

System links
- New York Highways; Interstate; US; State; Reference; Parkways

County routes in Greene County, New York, are signed with the Manual on Uniform Traffic Control Devices-standard yellow-on-blue pentagon route marker.

== Routes 1–40 ==
Route	Length (mi)	Length (km)	From	Via	To	Notes
CR 1	2.60	4.18	CR 3	West Settlement Road in Halcott	Silas Lake Road	
CR 2	7.10	11.43	NY 23A in Lexington	Little Westkill Road	NY 23 in Prattsville	
CR 3 (1)	4.56	7.34	Delaware County line (becomes CR 37)	Johnson Hollow and Halcott Mountain roads in Halcott	Dead end in Lexington	Year-round maintenance ends at the school bus turnaround (42.24126°N 74.46505°W), but the road remains a legally driveable public highway all the way through to the northern segment. The section in the col between Bearpen and Vly mountains is, at just above 2,800 feet (850 m) in elevation, the highest free public road in the state.
CR 3 (2)	0.57	0.92	Dead end	Mountain Road in Lexington	CR 2	See above
CR 4	1.99	3.20	NY 23 in Prattsville	Red Falls Road	CR 10 in Ashland	
CR 5	1.24	2.00	NY 23	Mail Route Road in Ashland	CR 10	
CR 6	5.80	9.33	NY 42	Spruceton Road in Lexington	End of county maintenance at Diamond Notch trailhead (road continues into Forest Preserve as Diamond Notch Trail.	
CR 7	1.92	3.09	NY 23	Gilboa Road in Prattsville	Schoharie County line (becomes CR 39)	Briefly enters Delaware County as CR 53
CR 8A	0.52	0.84	US 9W	Technology Drive in Coxsackie	US 9W	
CR 9	3.29	5.29	NY 81 in Coxsackie	Vocational Road	Bailey Street in Coxsackie village	
CR 10	13.99	22.51	NY 23 in Prattsville	West Settlement Road and Mount Pisgah Road	CR 20 in Durham	
CR 11	2.32	3.73	CR 10	Huntersfield Road in Prattsville	End of county maintenance	
CR 12	2.28	3.67	NY 23	South Street in Windham	NY 296	
CR 13	2.67	4.30	NY 23A/NY 42 in Lexington	Church Hill Road	CR 23C in Jewett	
CR 13A	0.33	0.53	NY 23A	Old State Road in Lexington	NY 42	
CR 14	3.73	6.00	CR 17	Goshen Street Road in Jewett	NY 296	
CR 15	2.31	3.72	NY 23	Sutton Hollow Road in Ashland	CR 10	
CR 16	5.45	8.77	Tannersville village line	Platte Clove Road in Hunter	End of county maintenance	
CR 17	4.53	7.29	NY 23A in Jewett	Jewett Heights Road	NY 23 in Ashland	
CR 18	2.26	3.64	NY 23A	Mountain House Road in Hunter	North–South Lake	
CR 19	2.73	4.39	NY 23 in Ashland	North Settlement Road	CR 10 in Windham	
CR 20	15.58	25.07	Schoharie County line in Durham	Cornwallville and Sunside roads	NY 23 in Cairo	
CR 20A	0.64	1.03	NY 23	Old Route 23 in Cairo	CR 20	
CR 20B	0.94	1.51	CR 20	Cornwallville Road in Durham	NY 145	
CR 21	4.31	6.94	NY 23	Mitchell Hollow Road in Windham	CR 10	
CR 22	1.73	2.78	CR 20	Oak Hill–Durham Road in Durham	NY 81	
CR 23B	9.90	15.93	NY 23 in Cairo	Mohican Trail	Catskill village line in Catskill	Former routing of NY 23; state-maintained as NY 911V between Thruway exit 21 and Austin Acres
CR 23C	18.12	29.16	NY 23A in Prattsville	High Road	Tannersville village line in Hunter	
CR 24	3.40	5.47	CR 31	Mountain Ave in Cairo	CR 23B	
CR 25	2.88	4.63	NY 23A	Onteora Park Road in Hunter	CR 23C	
CR 26	10.37	16.69	NY 81 in Greenville	Grapeville Road	NY 81 in Coxsackie	
CR 26A	0.30	0.48	NY 81	Grapeville Road South in Greenville	CR 26	
CR 27	0.86	1.38	NY 145	Deans Mill Road in Durham	NY 81	
CR 28	2.82	4.54	US 9W in Athens	Schoharie Turnpike	CR 74 at Second Street in Athens village	
CR 30	0.98	1.58	CR 47	Cauterskill Road in Catskill	Catskill village line	
CR 31	7.31	11.76	Catskill town line	Hearts Content Rd and Roosevelt Ave in Cairo	NY 145	
CR 32C	1.98	3.19	CR 10 in Ashland	Finch Road	Schoharie County line in Windham	
CR 35	5.52	8.88	NY 81	Red Mill and West roads in Greenville	NY 81	
CR 36	0.02	0.03	Schoharie County line (becomes CR 3)	Manorkill Road in Durham	Albany County line (becomes CR 354)	Unsigned; right-of-way does not intersect any roads in Greene County
CR 37	1.62	2.61	CR 26	Newry Road in Greenville	CR 38	
CR 38	1.50	2.41	Albany County line (becomes CR 405)	Newry Road in Greenville	Albany County line (becomes CR 111)	
CR 39	1.28	2.06	CR 31	Round Top Road in Cairo	CR 24	
CR 40	3.89	6.26	CR 23C in Jewett	Maplecrest Road	NY 296 in Windham	

== Routes 41 and up ==
Route	Length (mi)	Length (km)	From	Via	To	Notes
CR 41	7.46	12.01	CR 23B in Cairo	Lake Mills Road and Sanford Corners	NY 81 in Greenville	
CR 41A	0.05	0.08	CR 85	Jerome Avenue Extension in Cairo	CR 41	
CR 42	0.50	0.80	US 9W	Bronck House Road in Coxsackie	US 9W	
CR 45	3.39	5.46	Cairo town line	Earlton Road in Coxsackie	NY 81	Discontinuous at Grapeville Creek
CR 46	3.05	4.91	NY 32	Cairo Junction Road in Catskill	CR 23B	
CR 47	8.87	14.27	Ulster County line (becomes CR 34)	Old Kings Road and Cauterskill Road in Catskill	CR 23B	
CR 47A	0.21	0.34	CR 47	Webster Avenue in Catskill	Dead end	
CR 49	6.38	10.27	CR 23B in Catskill	Green Lake Road	US 9W in Coxsackie	Discontinuous at New York State Thruway
CR 49A	1.15	1.85	CR 49	Green Lake Road in Athens	Schoharie Turnpike	
CR 50	1.22	1.96	NY 81	North Road in Greenville	Albany County line (becomes CR 409)	
CR 51	10.16	16.35	NY 81 in Coxsackie	Medway Road	US 9W in New Baltimore	
CR 52	1.20	1.93	CR 13	Shoemaker Road in Lexington	CR 23C	
CR 53	2.17	3.49	NY 385	Howard Hall Road in Athens	CR 28	
CR 54	3.95	6.36	CR 26	Hannacroix Road in New Baltimore	CR 51	
CR 56	3.19	5.13	CR 40	Big Hollow Road in Windham	Dead end	
CR 57	5.33	8.58	CR 28 in Athens village	Farm To Market Road	Coxsackie village line in Coxsackie	
CR 61	7.08	11.39	Coxsackie village line in Coxsackie	River Road	NY 144 in New Baltimore	
CR 63	1.88	3.03	NY 23	West Settlement Road in Ashland	CR 10	
CR 64	0.26	0.42	NY 385	Upper Ely Street in Coxsackie	Coxsackie village line	
CR 65	1.21	1.95	NY 296	Brooksburgh Road in Windham	NY 23	
CR 65A	0.32	0.51	CR 40	Brooksburgh Road in Windham	CR 65	
CR 67	14.04	22.60	CR 23B in Cairo	Sandy Plains Road, Schoharie Turnpike, and Freehold Road	NY 81 in Durham	
CR 67A	0.53	0.85	NY 145	Freehold Road in Durham	CR 67	
CR 74	2.22	3.57	US 9W in Athens	Leeds-Athens Road	CR 28 at Second Street in Athens village	
CR 75	1.60	2.57	NY 81 in Greenville	Medusa Road	Albany County line in Durham (becomes CR 403)	
CR 77	1.03	1.66	CR 23C	Hesley Road in Jewett	CR 14	
CR 78	1.51	2.43	CR 23C	Stock Farm Road in Jewett	Colgate Lane	
CR 79	0.24	0.39	CR 12	Church Street in Windham	NY 23	
CR 80	0.13	0.21	Greene County Office Building	County Home Road in Cairo	CR 24	
CR 83	1.68	2.70	NY 214 in Hunter	Ski Bowl Road	NY 23A in Hunter village	
CR 84	0.55	0.89	NY 23 / NY 145	Durham Road in Cairo	CR 23B	Formerly part of NY 145
CR 85	0.42	0.68	CR 23B	Greenville Road in Cairo	NY 23	Former routing of NY 32

== See also ==
- County routes in New York
