= New York State Route 81 =

Highway in New York

New York State Route 81
- Map of eastern New York with NY 81 highlighted in red

Route information
- Maintained by NYSDOT
- Length: 22.49 mi (36.19 km)
- Existed: 1930–present

Major junctions
- West end: NY 145 / NY 910G in Rensselaerville
- East end: US 9W / NY 385 in Coxsackie

Location
- Country: United States
- State: New York
- Counties: Albany, Greene

Highway system
- New York Highways; Interstate; US; State; Reference; Parkways
← I-81	→ NY 82

New York State Route 81 (NY 81) is an east–west state highway in the Capital District of New York in the United States. The western terminus of the route is at an intersection with NY 145 and Potter Hollow Road (unsigned NY 910G) in the hamlet of Cooksburg within the town of Rensselaerville. Its eastern terminus is at a junction with U.S. Route 9W (US 9W) in the town of Coxsackie. East of US 9W, the right-of-way of NY 81 continues southeast to the village of Coxsackie as NY 385. NY 81 intersects NY 32 north of the hamlet of Cairo.

== Route description ==
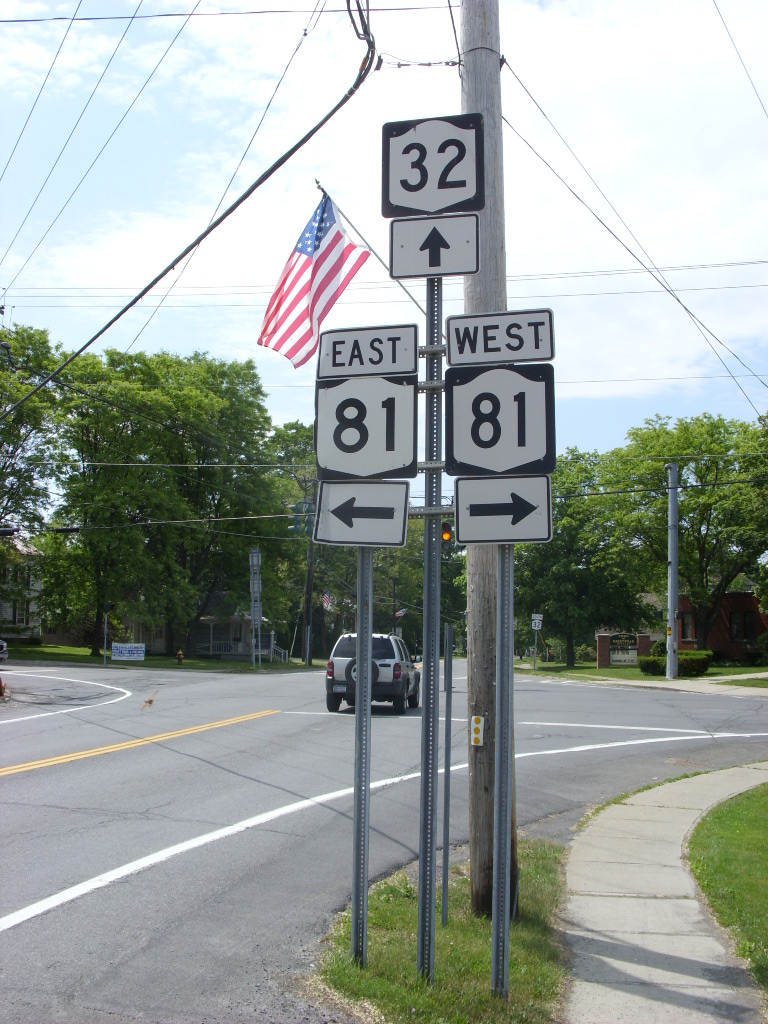
Junction of NY 81 along NY 32 northbound in Greenville

NY 81 begins at an intersection with NY 145 and Potter Hollow Road (unsigned NY 910G) in the hamlet of Cooksburg (in the town of Rennselaerville). NY 81 proceeds eastward through Rennselaerville, as a two-lane rural roadway, paralleling and crossing some power lines. After turning to the southeast, NY 81 crosses into the Greene County town of Durham. Entering the hamlet of Oak Hill, the route becomes a two-lane residential street, intersecting with the terminus of County Route 22 (CR 22; Oak Hill Road). After CR 22, NY 81 bends eastward out of Oak Hill, intersecting with the northern terminus of CR 27. Paralleling a nearby creek, CR 67 forks to the southeast, while NY 81 continues on its right-of-way through Durham. NY 81 bends northeastward, intersecting with the northern terminus of CR 75, where it turns eastward into the town of Greenville. In Greenville, NY 81 is the main street, remaining a two-lane residential street. Intersecting with CR 50 (North Road).

NY 81 continues eastward through Greenville, returning to being a rural two-lane highway and entering the hamlet of West Greenville. A short distance eastward, NY 81 enters the hamlet of Greenville, where it doubles as a residential-commercial street, where it crosses NY 32. After NY 32, the route forks to the southeast at an intersection with CR 26, which is quickly connected via CR 26A. Gradually bending eastward through the town of Greenville, NY 81 intersects with the northern terminus of CR 41 (Greenville Center Road). After CR 41, NY 81 bends to the southeast once again, winding past at an intersection with CR 35 (West Road), which terminates there. Making a dart eastward, NY 81 turns to the southeast past the hamlet of Surprise, where the route becomes a rural two-lane roadway once again. Just after Surprise, NY 81 enters the town of Coxsackie, winding southeastward past an intersection with CR 45, entering the hamlet of Earlton. The route remains rural, crossing intersections with CR 51 and CR 9 (Old Plank Road), bending to the northeast. Intersecting with a former alignment of itself, NY 81 turns eastward, intersecting with the eastern terminus of CR 26.

After CR 26, NY 81 crosses over the New York State Thruway (I-87) then parallels another former alignment of itself. Through Coxsackie, NY 81 intersects with US 9W in a small commercial strip. This serves as the eastern terminus of NY 81, which continues eastward as NY 385 (Mansion Street).

== History ==
NY 81 was assigned as part of the 1930 renumbering of state highways in New York. It originally began at US 9W in the town of Coxsackie and ended at NY 30 in the village of Middleburgh. Along the way, it intersected NY 145, which ended at NY 81 in the hamlet of Cooksburg. NY 81 was truncated to Cooksburg c. 1938, and its former routing to Middleburgh became an extension of NY 145.

== Major intersections ==
County	Location	mi	km	Destinations	Notes
Albany	Rensselaerville	0.00	0.00	NY 145 / Potter Hollow Road (NY 910G west) – Cairo, Middleburgh	Hamlet of Cooksburg
Greene	Town of Greenville	10.31	16.59	NY 32 – Albany, Cairo	Hamlet of Greenville
Greene	Town of Coxsackie	22.49	36.19	US 9W / NY 385 south to I-90 / New York Thruway – Coxsackie, Albany, Catskill	Eastern terminus; northern terminus of NY 385
1.000 mi = 1.609 km; 1.000 km = 0.621 mi
