= WKNY-TV =

Television station in Kingston, New York (1954–1956)

- Kingston, New York; United States
- Channels: Analog: 66 (UHF)

Programming
- Affiliations: NBC; CBS; ABC; DuMont

Ownership
- Owner: WKNY-TV Corp.

History
- First air date: May 24, 1954
- Last air date: July 25, 1956

Technical information
- ERP: 21.4 kW
- HAAT: 189 m (620 ft)
- Transmitter coordinates: 41°53′7″N 73°58′9″W

WKNY-TV (channel 66) was a television station in Kingston, New York, United States, which served the Hudson Valley from May 1954 to July 1956. Owned alongside radio station WKNY, it broadcast from studios and a transmitter site in Port Ewen, south of Kingston. Economic issues inherent with early ultra high frequency (UHF) stations led to its demise. It was approved to move to channel 21 (allocated to Poughkeepsie) but never did so.

== History ==
In June 1952, the Kingston Broadcasting Company, owner of radio station WKNY (1490 AM), applied to the Federal Communications Commission (FCC) for a new television station to be built on the city's allotted channel 66. The application was granted by the FCC on January 23, 1953.

It was not until the second half of 1953 that activity in earnest began around the construction permit. In September, the FCC approved the transmitter to be sited at Port Ewen along U.S. Route 9W, where a 600-foot (180 m) tower would be erected to transmit WKNY-TV. By this time, affiliation with NBC and CBS had been secured for the new outlet. In early 1954, the WKNY-TV Corporation was created to serve as the station's licensee, and work on the tower had progressed after winter weather meant all work had come to a halt during February.

After broadcasting test patterns since April 23, WKNY-TV began telecasting programs in the final week of May 1954, with the formal dedication taking place on May 31. It was the 300th station interconnected with coaxial cables to provide network programming and the first clearly received TV station for the Mid-Hudson Valley area, midway between New York City and the stations in Albany and Schenectady. All four networks of the day—NBC, CBS, ABC, and DuMont—were incorporated in its programming. The station operated with a staff of 12, and many employees had multiple duties. Robert L. Sabin, the first operations manager, sold advertising time, anchored the 6 p.m. newscast, and then was the cameraman for the local show that immediately followed. From the outset, the station emphasized local and live programming, which comprised as much as half of its schedule.

While a television channel, channel 21, had also been allocated to nearby Poughkeepsie, the owners vacated the construction permit in March 1954. As it became clearer that UHF stations like WKNY-TV—with their channels that not all sets could tune—were at an economic disadvantage, WKNY-TV sought to move to the lower channel number. In November 1954, the station proposed to the FCC that it be allowed to move to Poughkeepsie's channel 21. The FCC approved the shift in April 1955, noting that the station had been citing technical difficulties that impeded full-power operation on channel 66.

Having never moved to channel 21, WKNY-TV left the air on July 25, 1956, announcing its temporary suspension of programming the day before. Even though WKNY-TV retained affiliation with the three networks (DuMont having folded) and aired 34 hours of network programs a week, its status as a UHF station led to hesitance to advertise on the part of local and national firms—even though it tied for the lowest advertising rates of any UHF station as of January 1955. This directly affected the station's ability to air network programming. WKNY-TV president Joseph K. Close noted that in spite of good set sales and conversion rates, "we have not been able to make time sales in sufficient volume" to continue operating as a going concern. The station retained its construction permit, but the WKNY-TV Corporation was dissolved in 1958, and the construction permit was surrendered in March 1960.
