= New York State Route 385 =

State highway in Greene County, New York, US

New York State Route 385
- Map of Greene County in eastern New York with NY 385 highlighted in red

Route information
- Maintained by NYSDOT
- Length: 13.79 mi (22.19 km)
- Existed: c. 1932–present

Major junctions
- South end: US 9W in Catskill
- North end: US 9W / NY 81 in Coxsackie

Location
- Country: United States
- State: New York
- Counties: Greene

Highway system
- New York Highways; Interstate; US; State; Reference; Parkways
← NY 384	→ NY 386

New York State Route 385 (NY 385) is a state highway in Greene County, New York, in the United States. It runs from the village of Catskill to the village of Coxsackie, serving as an alternate route of U.S. Route 9W between the two locations. While US 9W follows a more inland routing, NY 385 runs along the Hudson River and serves the village of Athens. Modern NY 385 is the original routing of US 9W between Catskill and Coxsackie. NY 385 was originally assigned c. 1932 to what is now US 9W between Catskill and Coxsackie; however, the alignments of both routes were flipped by the following year.

== Route description ==
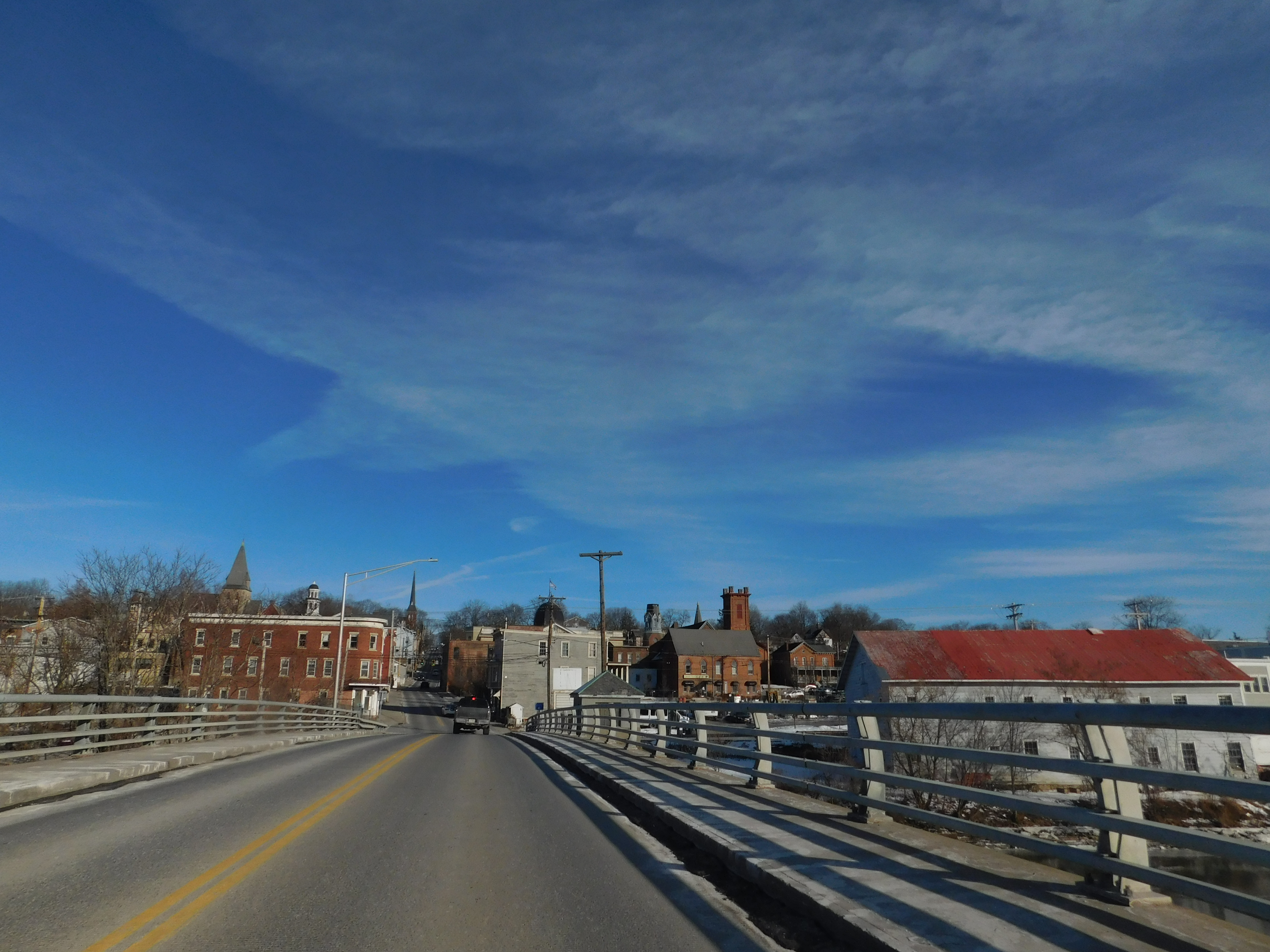
The Uncle Sam Bridge over Catskill Creek on NY 385 in Catskill

NY 385 begins at a fork from US 9W (West Bridge Street / Maple Avenue) in the village of Catskill. Proceeding northeast along West Bridge Street, NY 385 is a two-lane mixed residential/commercial street through the southern end of the village, becoming a commercial street just before crossing over Catskill Creek. After Catskill Creek, the route enters downtown Catskill, crossing northeast into another residential neighborhood, where it junctions with Spring Street. At Spring Street, NY 385 turns north while Bridge Street dead-ends two blocks away. NY 385 along Spring Street is primarily residential, passing several blocks of homes through Catskill, soon reaching a junction with NY 23 and access to the Rip Van Winkle Bridge, which crosses the Hudson River.

NY 385 continues north from NY 23, dropping the Spring Street moniker as it enters the town of Catskill. Still a two-lane residential road, the route begins paralleling the CSX West Shore Line as it enters the hamlet of Hamburg. Northeast of Hamburg, NY 385 continues winding northeast into the town of Athens. Passing several commercial businesses along the way, the route bends eastward towards the Hudson River before turning northeast past a junction with County Route 53 (CR 53 or Howard Hall Road). After CR 53, NY 385 becomes a wooded roadway, soon bending eastward along the riverbanks into the village of Athens, where it gains the Washington Street moniker.

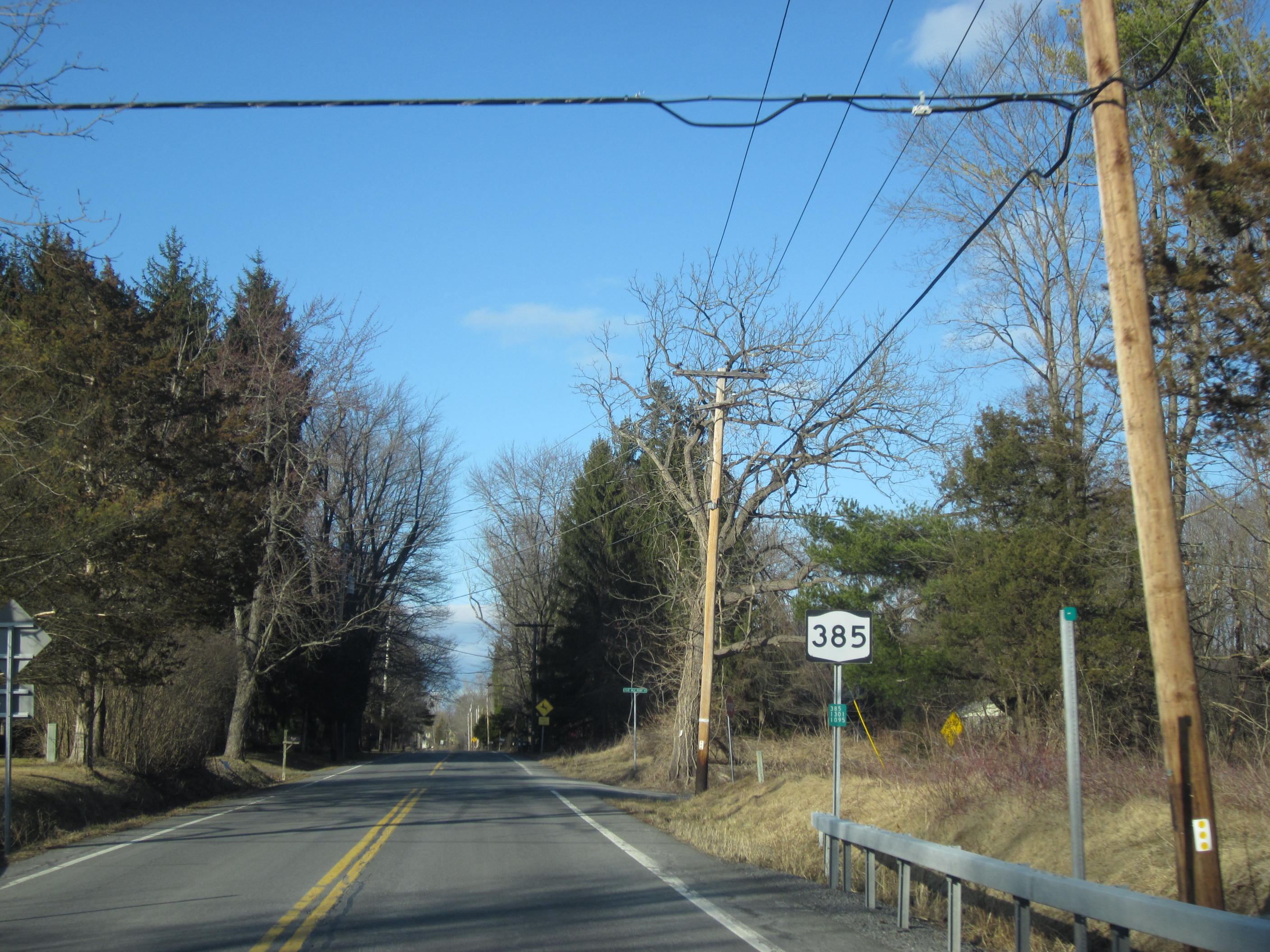
NY 385 north of the village of Athens

The first stretch into the village of Athens is primarily wooded, but as it comes to near the riverbank, NY 385 turns northeast into the developed portion of the community, becoming the main north–south road through the village. NY 385 meets Second Street at the center of the village, changing names to North Washington Street as it turns northward along the riverbank through Athens. Near a junction with River Road, the route drops the North Washington Street moniker as it crosses back into the town of Athens. Remaining a two-lane rural road, NY 385 continues north into the town of Coxsackie. In Coxsackie, NY 385 becomes a two-lane residential street through the town, winding northward through the municipality for several miles. As the Hudson River soon returns towards NY 385, the route turns northwest and enters the village of Coxsackie.

Now in the village, NY 385 gains the Washington Avenue moniker, winding northwest through the village as a two-lane residential street. At the intersection with Sunset Boulevard, the route turns northward, reaching a junction with Mansion Street. At this junction, NY 385 turns northwest on Mansion Street and continues through another residential section of the village. The route passes a merge with Van Dyke Street, where it becomes a more straight route towards the west-northwest. Crossing under the West Shore Line, NY 385 enters downtown Coxsackie, becoming the main street through the village. After a bend to the west, NY 385 intersects Mansion Street Extension (unsigned NY 910U) then reaches a junction with US 9W, the northern terminus of NY 385. At the other side of the junction, NY 81 continues west past US 9W towards Albany County.

== History ==
NY 385 was once the majority of the Coxsackie Turnpike, which was legislated in 1805 to run from what is now Coxsackie through the hamlet of Climax and New Baltimore to connect to the Susquehannah turnpike in Durham. The company that ran the turnpike was in business for over a hundred years, until the road was sold to Greene County in 1910.

In 1908, the New York State Legislature created Route 3, an unsigned legislative route extending from the New Jersey state line north to Albany. Between the villages of Catskill and Coxsackie, Route 3 ran along the Hudson River, passing through the village of Athens along the way. When the first set of posted routes in New York were assigned in 1924, Route 3 became part of NY 10. In 1927, the segment of NY 10 south of Albany was redesignated as the New York portion of U.S. Route 9W following the creation of the U.S. Highway System. NY 385, meanwhile, was assigned c. 1932 to what is now US 9W between Catskill and Coxsackie. The alignments of NY 385 and US 9W were flipped by the following year, placing US 9W on the direct north–south highway from Catskill to Coxsackie and NY 385 on the riverside highway.

== Major intersections ==
The entire route is in Greene County.

Location	mi	km	Destinations	Notes
Village of Catskill	0.00	0.00	US 9W – Palenville, Saugerties, Albany	Southern terminus
Village of Catskill	1.46	2.35	NY 23 – Hudson, Cairo	
Town of Coxsackie	13.71	22.06	NY 910U (Mansion Street Extension)	Former routing of US 9W; southern terminus of unsigned NY 910U
Town of Coxsackie	13.79	22.19	US 9W / NY 81 west to New York Thruway – Catskill, Albany, Greenville	Northern terminus; eastern terminus of NY 81
1.000 mi = 1.609 km; 1.000 km = 0.621 mi
