= New York State Route 145 =

State highway in eastern New York, US

New York State Route 145
- NY 145 highlighted in red

Route information
- Maintained by NYSDOT
- Length: 46.99 mi (75.62 km)
- Existed: 1930–present

Major junctions
- South end: NY 23 in Cairo
- NY 81 in Rensselaerville; NY 30 in Middleburgh; NY 7 near Cobleskill; I-88 near Cobleskill
- North end: US 20 in Sharon

Location
- Country: United States
- State: New York
- Counties: Greene, Albany, Schoharie

Highway system
- New York Highways; Interstate; US; State; Reference; Parkways
← NY 144	→ NY 146

New York State Route 145 (NY 145) is a state highway in eastern New York in the United States. The highway extends for 47 miles (76 km) from NY 23 in the Greene County town of Cairo to U.S. Route 20 (US 20) in the Schoharie County town of Sharon. Along the way, NY 145 intersects NY 30 in Middleburgh and Interstate 88 (I-88) east of Cobleskill. NY 145 is a two-lane highway its entire length, with a passing lane on hills leaving Middleburgh in both directions. The route follows parts of the Susquehannah Turnpike from Cairo through East Durham and west.

== Route description ==
=== Greene and Albany counties ===
NY 145 begins at an at-grade interchange with NY 23 in the hamlet of Cairo (within the town of the same name). NY 145 proceeds northwest through Cairo as a two-lane asphalt residential street, becoming a commercial/residential mix near a large quarry on the southbound side. NY 145 continues northwest for several miles, passing Old State Highway 145 on the southbound side, bending further to the northwest into an intersection with County Route 31 (CR 31; Roosevelt Avenue) in a small residential neighborhood of Cairo. A short distance to the northwest, NY 145 crosses the town line, leaving Cairo for the town of Durham.

NY 145 through Durham remains a two-lane asphalt road, passing residences on both sides of the road, winding northwest past another quarry. Just north of the quarry, NY 145 becomes a two-lane commercial/industrial roadway, passing an intersection with the terminus of CR 67A. After CR 67A, more residences and industrial buildings begin to appear as the route enters the hamlet of East Durham. In East Durham, NY 145 intersects with CR 20B, leaving the small hamlet near Golden Hill Road. NY 145 winds northwest through Durham, passing a large industrial complex before crossing into the fields and residences nearby. At CR 27, NY 145 turns westward, slowly bending to the northwest once again.

NY 145 through the town of Durham remains a mix of commercial/industrial/residential buildings on each side of the highway, intersecting with CR 22 at the center of the hamlet of Durham. NY 145 continues northwest out of the hamlet of Durham, crossing similar surroundings for a distance, crossing the county line from Greene County into Albany County. Now in the town of Rensselaerville, entering the hamlet of Cooksburg. In Cooksburg, NY 145 intersects with the western terminus of NY 81 and the eastern terminus of Potter Hollow Road (unsigned NY 910G.)

North of Cooksburg, NY 145 winds north over Fox Creek through the town of Rensselaerville. After crossing a short residential stretch to the north, NY 145 intersects with the terminus of CR 352 (Fox Creek Road), entering the hamlet of Preston Hollow. In Preston Hollow, the route winds northwest past numerous residences and a local cemetery before bending westward at Preston Hollow Park. NY 145 northwest of Preston Hollow remains a two-lane rural roadway, winding northwest alongside Catskill Creek. A short distance to the northeast, NY 145 crosses the county line once again, this time leaving Albany County for Schoharie County.

=== Schoharie County ===
==== Broome to Cobleskill ====
After crossing the county line into Schoharie County, NY 145 winds northwest through the town of Broome. A short distance to the northwest the route enters a small hamlet centered around the CR 19A intersection (Hauverville Road), and proceeds west, intersecting with CR 19 (Stone Store Road), where it bends to the north through Broome, skirts the eastern shore of Vlai Pond near Gates Hill Road, and intersects the southern terminus of CR 50 (Windy Ridge Road) in the hamlet of Franklinton.

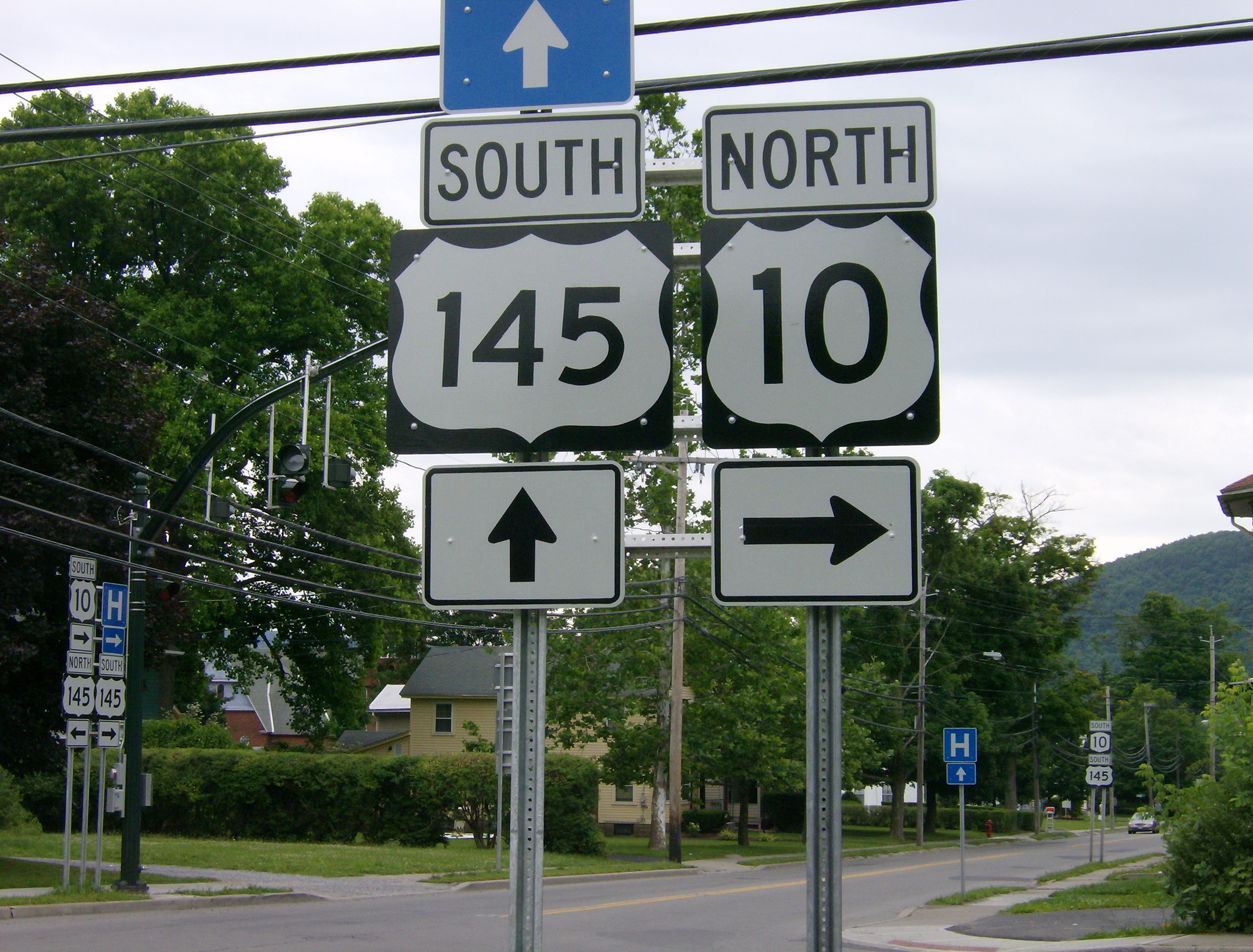
NY 145 overlaps NY 10 briefly in Cobleskill, although erroneous US-style shields are used to denote

NY 145 continues north parallel with CR 50, crossing through the town of Middleburgh and village of Middleburgh. South of Middleburgh Cemetery the route intersects with the terminus of CR 21 (Huntersland Road) and CR 66 (Cotton Hill Road). Now in downtown Middleburgh, NY 145 proceeds northwest along Main Street, a two-lane commercial street, passing an intersection with the village continuation of CR 36 (Clauerville Road). Several blocks east of CR 36, NY 145 intersects with NY 30 (River Street). NY 30 and NY 145 become concurrent for the length of a bridge over Schoharie Creek.

After NY 30 forks to the southeast, NY 145 bends northwest away from Schoharie Creek and intersects CR 57 (Sunnyside Road). Before leaving Middleburgh it intersects CR 41 (Ecker Hollow Road) and crosses into the town of Schoharie, intersecting CR 1A just before bending west towards the town of Cobleskill.

Now paralleling I-88 to the south, NY 145 winds west through Cobleskill, intersecting with the northern terminus of CR 41, crossing through the residential hamlet of East Cobleskill. After a bend to the northwest, NY 145 intersects with CR 1 (Mineral Springs Road) before entering exit 22 of I-88, a diamond interchange. Just north of I-88, NY 145 intersects with NY 7. NY 7 and NY 145 become concurrent, proceeding westward on a parallel of I-88, intersecting with Shad Point Road (former CR 60). NY 7 and NY 145 wind westward for a distance through Cobleskill, passing north of the Cobleskill Golf and Country Club before crossing into the village of Cobleskill.

==== Cobleskill to Sharon ====
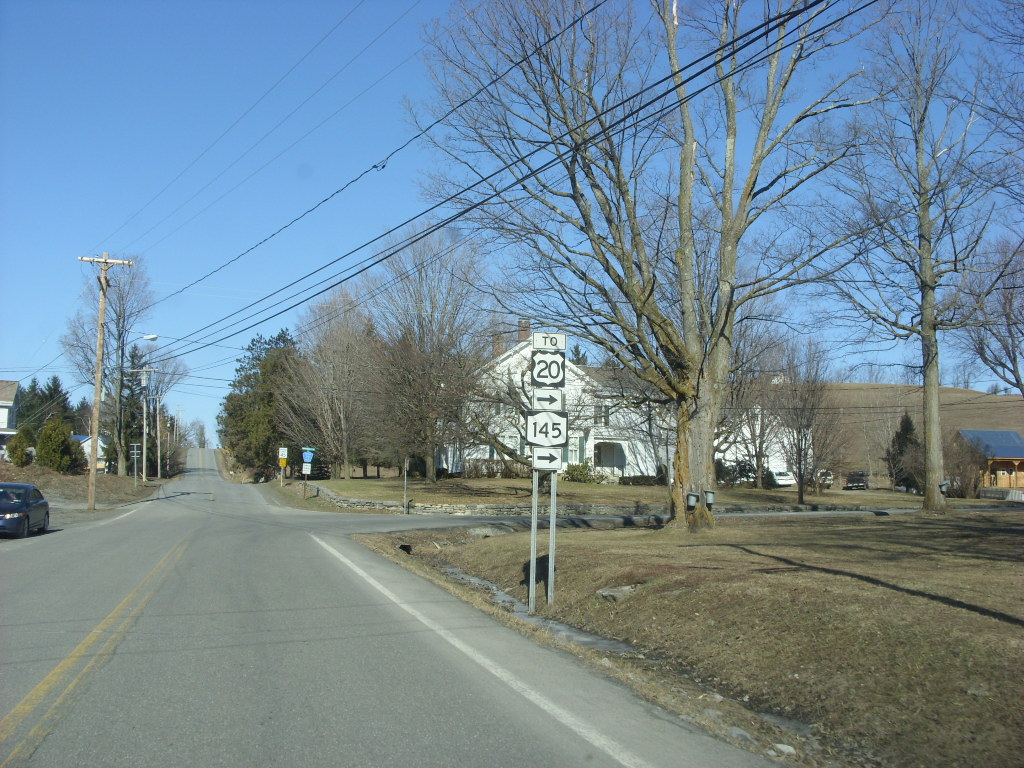
NY 145 northbound at the junction with CR 29 in Lawyersville. Signage is present, pointing drivers to US 20

Now in the village of Cobleskill, NY 7 and NY 145 gain the moniker of East Main Street, crossing over Cobleskill Creek before entering the downtown section of the village. After crossing over railroad tracks, NY 7 and NY 145 bend southwest through the village as East Main Street, a two-lane commercial street. At the intersection with South Grand Street, the routes intersect with NY 10 (North Grand Street). At this intersection, NY 7 forks onto a concurrency with NY 10 south, while NY 145 turns north onto North Grand, running concurrent with NY 10 north. This concurrency lasts three blocks, before NY 10 turns west on Elm Street. NY 145 continues north out of the village of Cobleskill. The route passes west of Cobleskill Rural Cemetery before crossing the town line at Edgewood Drive, back into the town of Cobleskill.

NY 145 continues northwest through the town of Cobleskill as a two-lane residential/rural road, entering the hamlet of Lawyersville. In Lawyersville, NY 145 intersects with CR 29 (Lawyersville Road), turning north onto a residential street through the hamlet. North of Lawyervsille, NY 145 winds northward for several miles, crossing into the town of Carlisle. In Carlisle, NY 145 intersects with the terminus of CR 11 (Little York Road), soon crossing into the town of Seward, where it intersects with Rock District Road. At this intersection, NY 145 bends west onto the right-of-way of Rock District, winding past farms on both sides of the highway.

Winding northwest through Seward, NY 145 crosses past residences before intersecting with CR 30 (Gardnersville Road). After a long wind to the northwest, the route crosses out of Seward for the town of Sharon. Through Sharon, NY 145 proceeds northwest as a two-lane rural road, soon entering the hamlet of Sharon, where it intersects with US 20. At this intersection, the NY 145 designation terminates, while the right-of-way continues north as CR 5A (Augusville Road) north to the Montgomery County line.

== History ==
In 1911, the New York State Legislature created Route 5-b, an unsigned legislative route extending from Cairo in Greene County to Cooksburg in Albany County via Durham. One year later, the legislature created Route 38-a, which began in Cobleskill and passed through Sharon before ending in Sharon Springs. On March 1, 1921, Route 5-b was eliminated while Route 38-a became part of Route 39, which continued west along what is now US 20 from Sharon Springs to the town of Madison. None of former Route 5-b nor the portion of Route 39 south of Sharon received a signed designation when the first set of posted routes in New York were assigned in 1924.

In the 1930 renumbering of state highways in New York, all of former legislative Route 5-b was designated as NY 145 while the Cobleskill–Sharon segment of former legislative Route 39 was assigned NY 164. At the same time, what is now NY 145 from Cooksburg to Middleburgh was designated as part of NY 81. The section of modern NY 145 between Middleburgh and NY 7 east of Cobleskill was assigned NY 433 c. 1937. By the following year, NY 145 was extended northward to Middleburgh while NY 81 was truncated southward to Cooksburg. NY 145 was extended again in both directions c. 1940. On its north end, it was altered to continue northwest through Cobleskill to Sharon, supplanting both NY 164 and NY 433 and briefly overlapping with NY 7 and NY 30 in Cobleskill and Middleburgh, respectively. On its south end, it was modified to overlap with NY 23 eastward to Catskill on what is now County Route 23B (CR 23B).

NY 145 originally entered the hamlet of Cairo on what is now CR 84 and met NY 23 in the center of the community at what is now CR 23B. Both NY 23 and NY 145 were realigned in the 1960s to follow a new arterial between Cairo and the Rip Van Winkle Bridge in Catskill. The first segment of the highway, a northerly bypass of the hamlet of Cairo, opened c. 1961. The remainder of the arterial was completed in the mid-1960s. On January 1, 1970, NY 145 was truncated back to its current southern terminus in Cairo, eliminating the overlap between NY 23 and NY 145.

== Major intersections ==
County	Location	mi	km	Destinations	Notes
Greene	Cairo	0.00	0.00	NY 23 – Catskill, Windham	Southern terminus; hamlet of Cairo
Albany	Rensselaerville	13.07	21.03	NY 81 east / Potter Hollow Road (NY 910G west) – Greenville	Western terminus of NY 81; eastern terminus of unsigned NY 910G; hamlet of Cooksburg
Schoharie	Village of Middleburgh	28.75	46.27	NY 30 north (River Street) – Schoharie	Southern terminus of concurrency with NY 30
Schoharie	Village of Middleburgh	28.86	46.45	NY 30 south – Grand Gorge	Northern terminus of concurrency with NY 30
Schoharie	Town of Cobleskill	36.31	58.44	I-88 – Oneonta, Binghamton, Albany	Diamond interchange; exit 22 on I-88
Schoharie	Town of Cobleskill	36.51	58.76	NY 7 east – Howes Cave, Central Bridge	Southern terminus of concurrency with NY 7
Schoharie	Village of Cobleskill	39.88	64.18	NY 7 west / NY 10 south (North Grand Street)	Northern terminus of concurrency with NY 7; southern terminus of concurrency with NY 10
Schoharie	Village of Cobleskill	40.10	64.53	NY 10 north (Elm Street)	Northern terminus of concurrency with NY 10
Schoharie	Sharon	46.99	75.62	US 20 / CR 5A north – Sharon Springs, Duanesburg	Northern terminus; southern terminus of CR 5A; hamlet of Sharon
1.000 mi = 1.609 km; 1.000 km = 0.621 mi: Concurrency terminus

== See also ==
- List of county routes in Greene County, New York
