= Crow's Nest (New York) =

Mountain in New York, United States

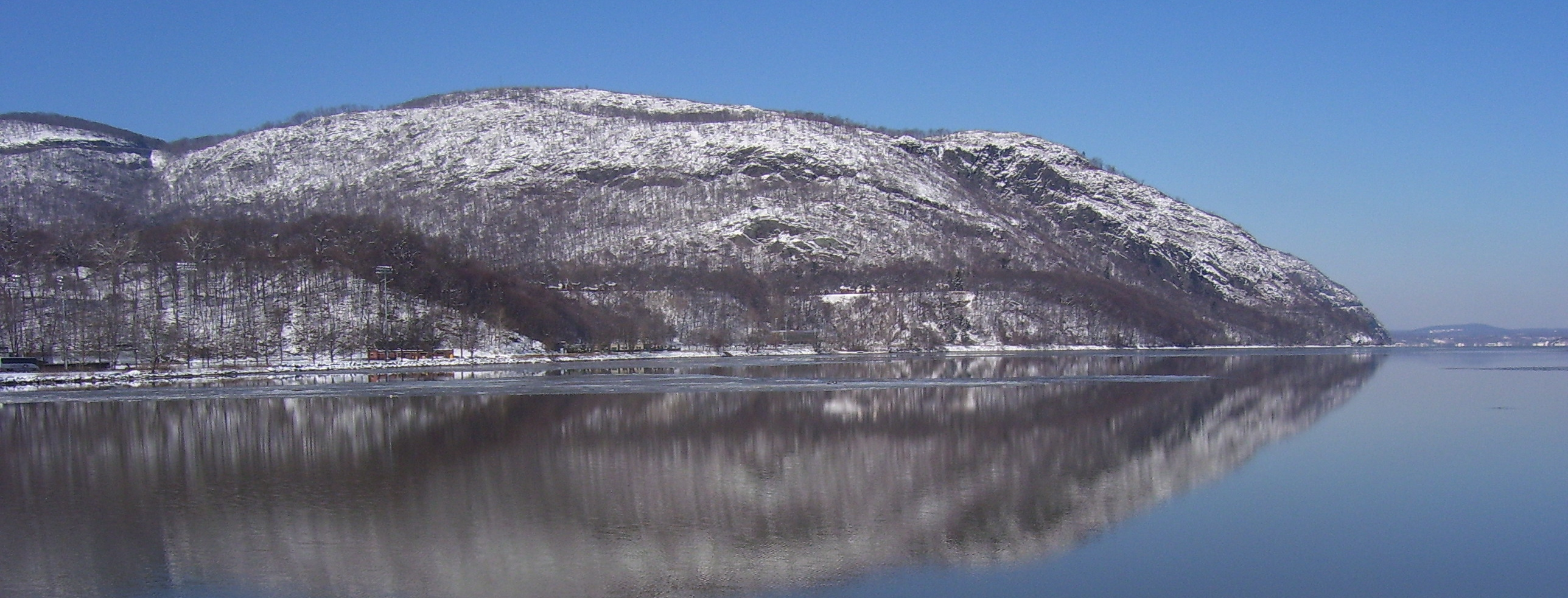
- Crow's Nest as seen from North Dock at West Point

Highest point
- Elevation: 1,407 ft (429 m)
- Coordinates: 41°24′31.23″N 73°59′1.9″W

Geography
- Location within New York Location within the United States
- Location: Highlands, New York, U.S.
- Parent range: Hudson Highlands
- Topo map: USGS West Point

Climbing
- Easiest route: trail

Crow's Nest is a mountain along the west bank of the Hudson River in the Town of Highlands on the northern edge of the United States Military Academy (USMA) at West Point. US 9W passes just west of its summit and offers panoramic views of the Hudson River, the military academy's ski slope, and Constitution Island.

A small portion of the northern slopes are within Storm King State Park, but most of the mountain is on USMA property and thus generally off limits to the public (it is fenced off along Route 9W). There is a television relay tower located near the summit.

== Gallery ==
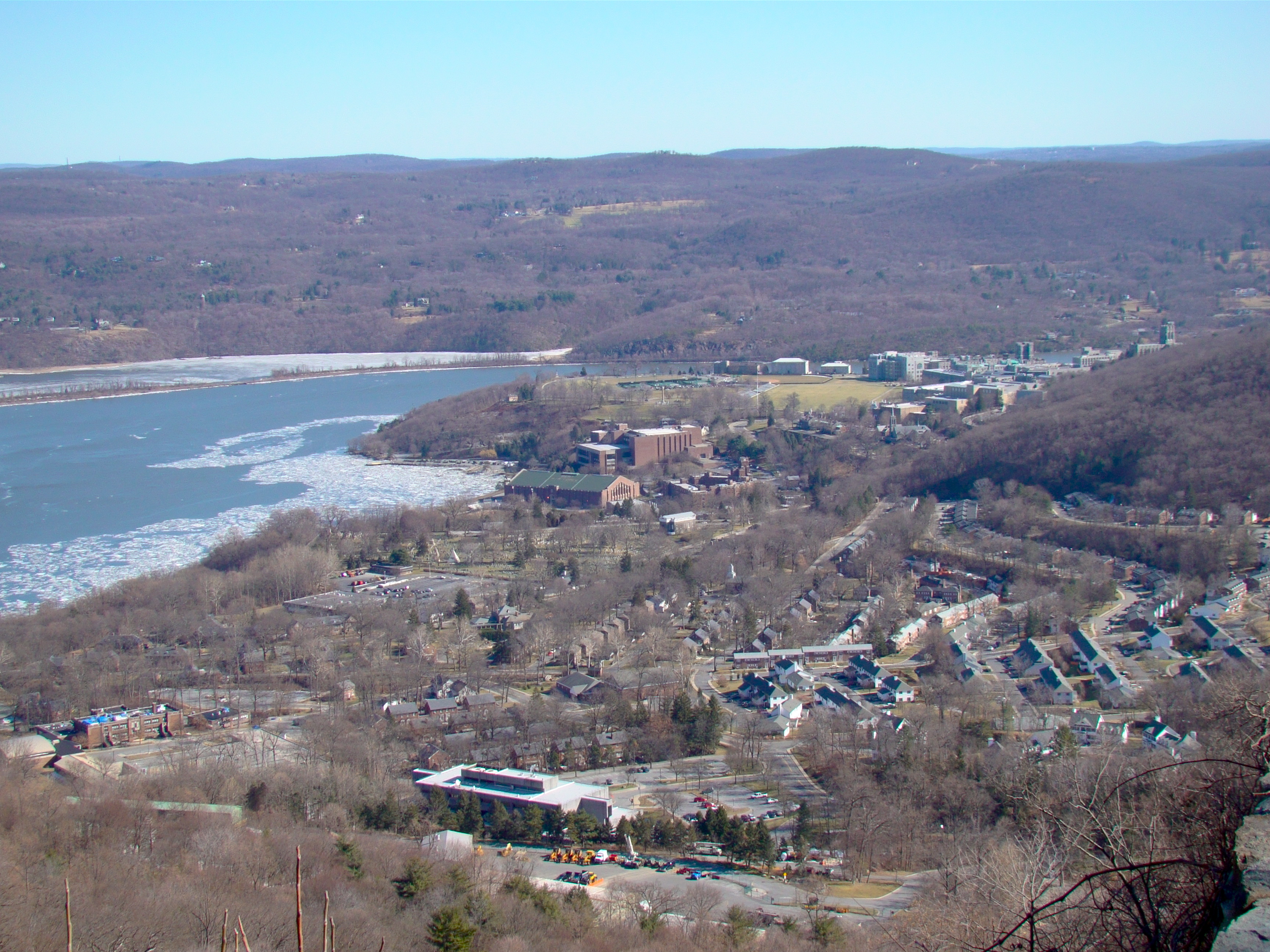
West Point viewed from US Route 9W just south of Crow's Nest

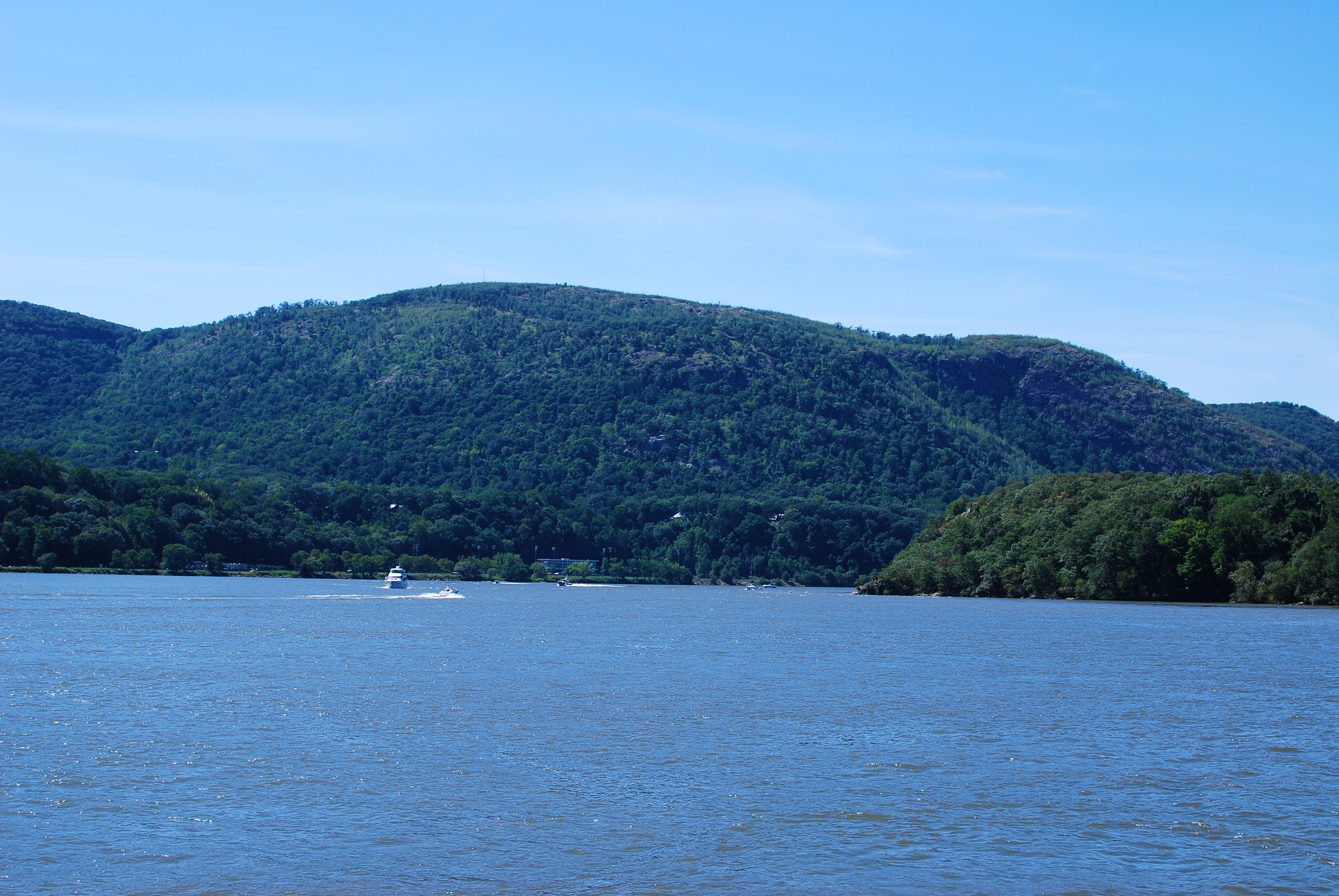
Crow's Nest seen from the Hudson
