= New Windsor (CDP), New York =

New Windsor
- Census-designated place
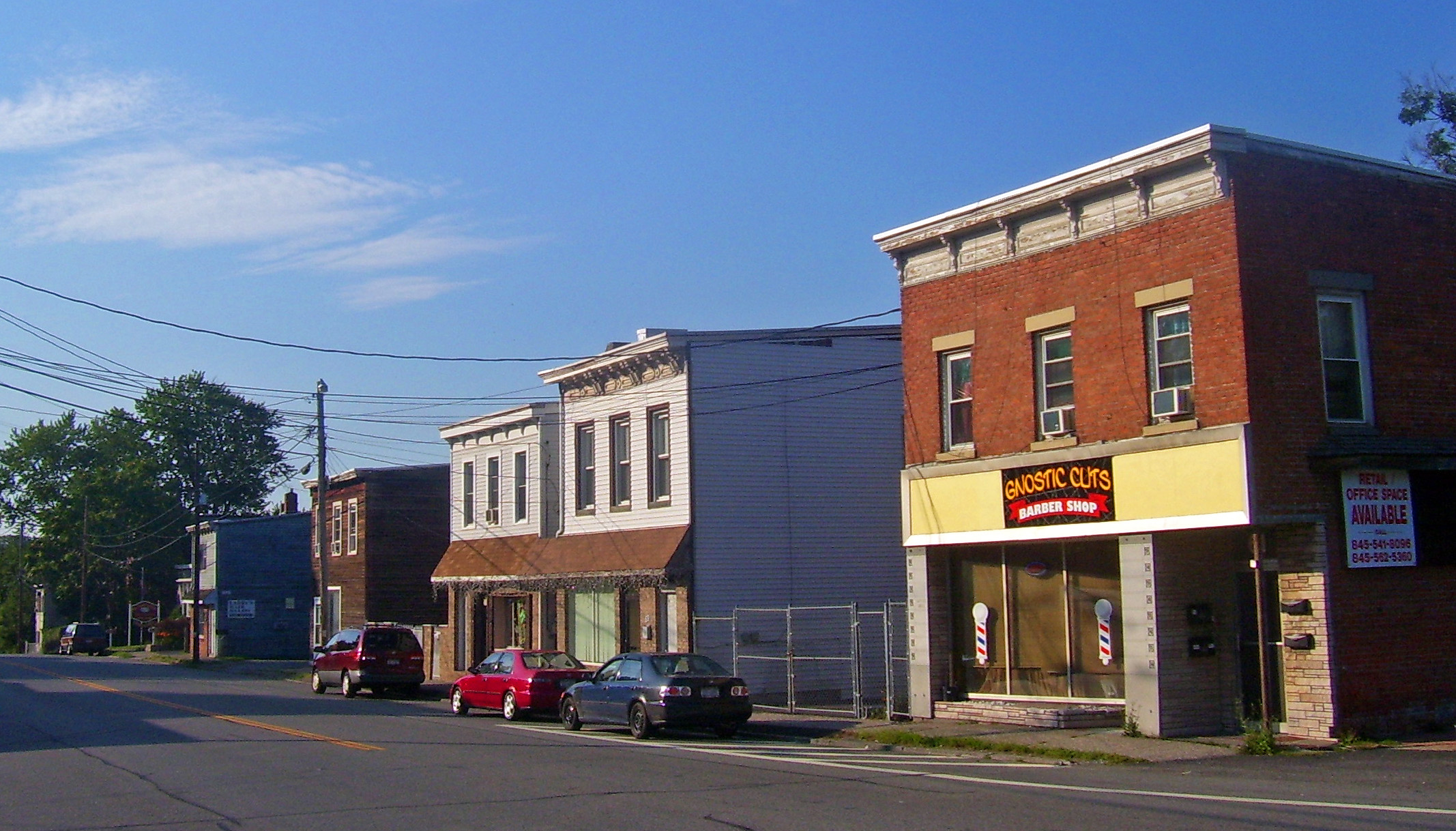
- Entrance from New Windsor into Newburgh, looking north along US 9W

- Location in Orange County and the state of New York.
- Coordinates: 41°29′15″N 74°01′08″W
- Country: United States
- State: New York
- Region: Hudson Valley
- County: Orange

Area
  - Total: 3.80 sq mi (9.85 km^{2})
  - Land: 3.76 sq mi (9.74 km^{2})
  - Water: 0.042 sq mi (0.11 km^{2})
- Elevation: 140 ft (43 m)

Population (2020)
  - Total: 8,882
  - Density: 2,361.2/sq mi (911.68/km^{2})
- Time zone: UTC-5 (Eastern (EST))
  - Summer (DST): UTC-4 (EDT)
- ZIP code: 12553
- Area code: 845
- Exchanges: 561-569
- FIPS code: 36-50837
- GNIS feature ID: 0958467

New Windsor is a census-designated place (CDP) in the town of New Windsor in Orange County, New York, United States. The population was 8,882 at the 2020 census. It is part of the Kiryas Joel–Poughkeepsie–Newburgh, NY Metropolitan Statistical Area as well as the larger New York–Newark–Bridgeport, NY-NJ-CT-PA Combined Statistical Area.

== Geography ==
According to the United States Census Bureau, the New Windsor has a total area of 3.8 square miles (9.8 km^{2}), of which 3.8 square miles (9.7 km^{2}) is land and 0.0 square mile (0.1 km^{2}) (1.05%) is water.

== Demographics ==
Historical population
Census	Pop.	Note	%±
2000	9,077		—
2010	8,922		−1.7%
2020	8,882		−0.4%
U.S. Decennial Census

As of the census of 2000, there were 9,077 people, 3,457 households, and 2,416 families residing in the central CDP of the town. The population density was 2,413.3 inhabitants per square mile (931.8/km^{2}). There were 3,581 housing units at an average density of 367.7 inhabitants/km^{2} (952.1 inhabitants/mi^{2}). The racial makeup of the town was 85.76% White, 6.10% African American, 0.15% Native American, 1.41% Asian, 0.03% Pacific Islander, 4.68% from other races, and 1.86% from two or more races. 11.52% of the population were Hispanic or Latino of any race.

There were 3,457 households, out of which 32.5% had children under the age of 18 living with them, 54.9% were married couples living together, 10.6% have a woman whose husband does not live with her, and 30.1% were non-families. 24.4% of all households were made up of individuals, and 10.5% had someone living alone who was 65 years of age or older. The average household size was 2.61 and the average family size was 3.15.

In the CDP, the population was spread out, with 25.5% under the age of 18, 7.0% from 18 to 24, 29.9% from 25 to 44, 23.1% from 45 to 64, and 14.5% who were 65 years of age or older. The median age was 38 years. For every 100 females, there were 95.0 males. For every 100 females age 18 and over, there were 90.4 males.

The median income for a household in the CDP was $50,316, and the median income for a family was $62,439. Males had a median income of $45,750 versus $30,156 for females. The per capita income for the CDP was $22,784. 5.3% of the population and 3.4% of families were below the poverty line. Out of the total people living in poverty, 4.3% are under the age of 18 and 8.5% are 65 or older.

== Education ==
The majority of the CDP is in Newburgh City School District, while a section is in Cornwall Central School District.
