= Coxsackie, New York =

- Town
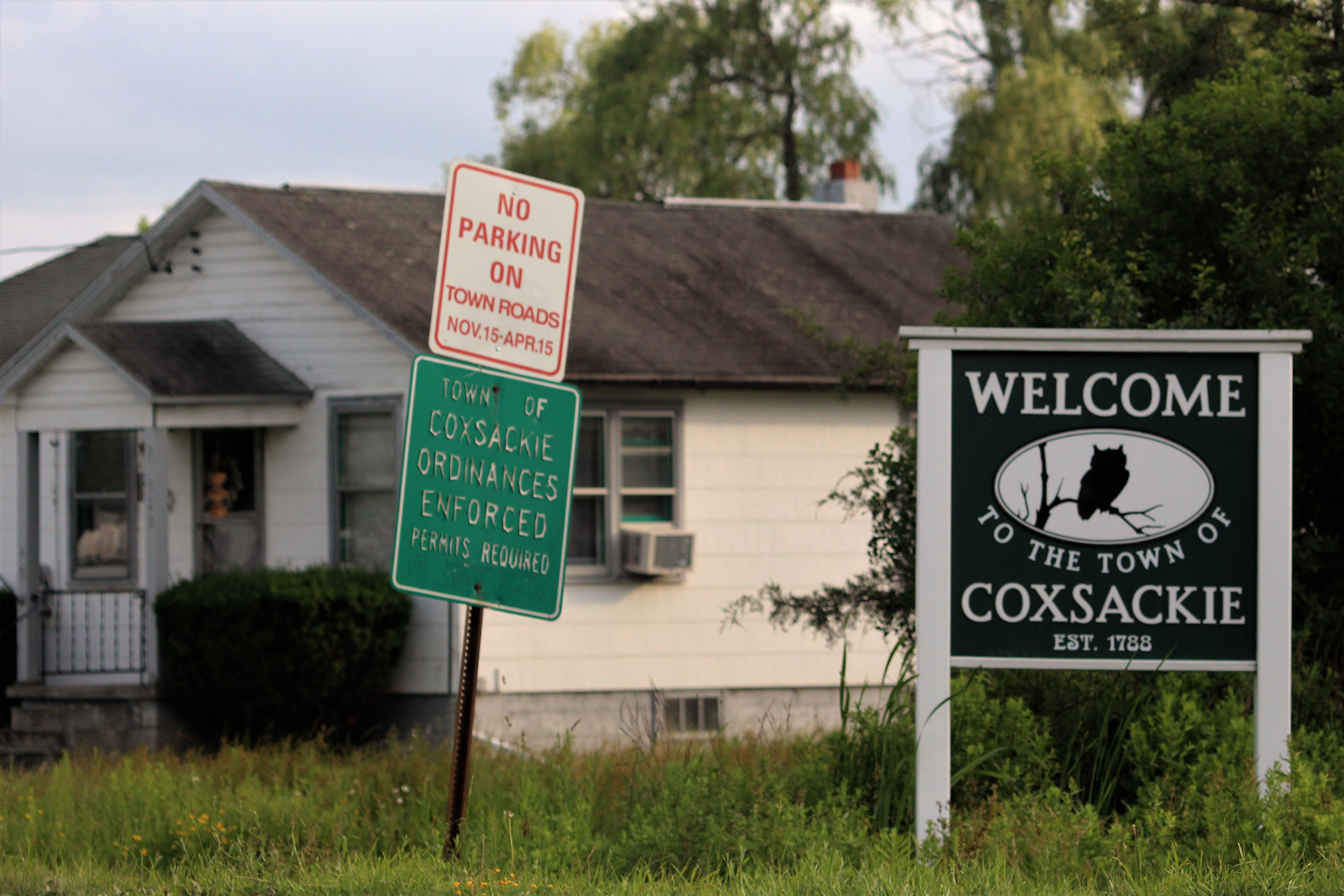

- Location in Greene County and the state of New York.

- Location of New York in the United States
- Coordinates: 42°21′27″N 73°48′29″W
- Country: United States
- State: New York
- County: Greene

Government
  - Town Supervisor: Richard K. Hanse
  - Town Council: Members: Donald A. Daoust (D); Thomas M. Hobart (R); Jeffrey R. Lewis (R); Patrick B. Kennedy (D)

Area
  - Total: 38.4 sq mi (99.4 km^{2})
  - Land: 36.9 sq mi (95.6 km^{2})
  - Water: 1.5 sq mi (3.8 km^{2})

Population (2020)
  - Total: 8,382
  - Density: 227/sq mi (87.7/km^{2})
- Time zone: UTC-5 (EST)
  - Summer (DST): UTC-4 (EDT)
- ZIP Codes: 12051 (Coxsackie); 12015 (Athens); 12042 (Climax); 12058 (Earlton); 12192 (West Coxsackie); 12176 (Surprise); 12414 (Catskill)
- Area code: 518
- FIPS code: 36-039-18729
- Website: coxsackie.org

Coxsackie (/kʊkˈsæki/ kuuk-SAK-ee) is a town in Greene County, New York, United States. The population in the 2020 census was 8,382, a decrease from the 2010 census. It is the second-largest town in Greene County after Catskill. The name of the town is said to be derived from a Native American term, but it has various translations ("owl's hoot" is locally common).

Within the area governed as a town, there is also a village called Coxsackie. The town is in the northeastern part of the county.

The town of Coxsackie is notable for being the namesake of the Coxsackievirus (a type of enterovirus), which was first isolated in this town.

== History ==
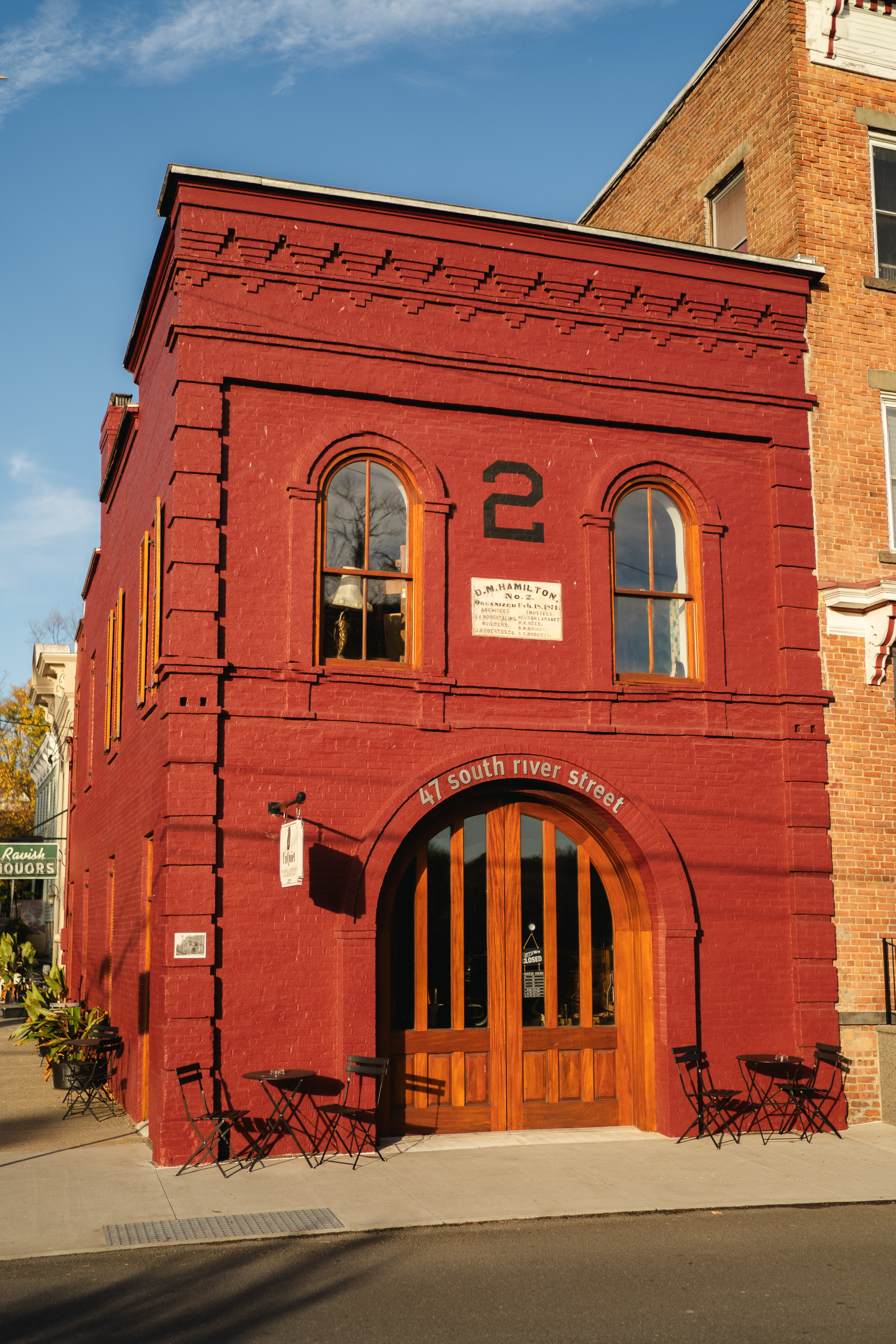
A historic building in downtown Coxsackie

The settlement of Coxsackie began in the seventeenth century, in approximately 1652, as part of the development of New Netherland. The government of the area became established as a district in 1772, and Coxsackie was founded in 1788 with a town form of government. Part of Coxsackie was lost when the town of Durham was formed in 1790. Further land was lost in the formation of the newer towns of Cairo and Greenville (1803), New Baltimore (1811), and Athens (1815).

One of the first settlers in Coxsackie was Pieter Bronck, of the same family for which the Bronx is named. In 1663, he built the Pieter Bronck House in West Coxsackie, which is open as a museum. The nearby family burial ground includes a separate plot with marked graves for slaves of the family.

In 1900, the combined population of the town and village was 2,994.

== Geography ==
According to the United States Census Bureau, the town has a total area of 38.4 square miles (99.4 km^{2}), of which 36.9 square miles (95.6 km^{2}) is land and 1.5 square miles (3.8 km^{2}, or 3.86%) is water.

The eastern town line is defined by the Hudson River and is the border of Columbia County.

The New York State Thruway (Interstate 87) and U.S. Route 9W pass through the town. State Route 385, running north-south through the town, serves the older villages and other areas near the Hudson River. This road earlier served as the majority of the Coxsackie Turnpike.

== Demographics ==
Historical population
| Census | Pop. | Note | %± |
|---|---|---|---|
| 1820 | 2,355 | | — |
| 1830 | 3,373 | | 43.2% |
| 1840 | 3,539 | | 4.9% |
| 1850 | 3,741 | | 5.7% |
| 1860 | 3,661 | | −2.1% |
| 1870 | 3,829 | | 4.6% |
| 1880 | 4,009 | | 4.7% |
| 1890 | 3,773 | | −5.9% |
| 1900 | 4,102 | | 8.7% |
| 1910 | 3,620 | | −11.8% |
| 1920 | 2,994 | | −17.3% |
| 1930 | 3,139 | | 4.8% |
| 1940 | 4,146 | | 32.1% |
| 1950 | 4,703 | | 13.4% |
| 1960 | 4,794 | | 1.9% |
| 1970 | 4,236 | | −11.6% |
| 1980 | 6,018 | | 42.1% |
| 1990 | 7,633 | | 26.8% |
| 2000 | 8,884 | | 16.4% |
| 2010 | 8,918 | | 0.4% |
| 2020 | 8,382 | | −6.0% |
2020

=== 2000 ===
As of the census of 2000, there were 8,918 people, 2,422 households, and 1,583 families residing in the town. The population density was 240.8 inhabitants per square mile (93.0/km^{2}). There were 2,789 housing units at an average density of 75.6 per square mile (29.2/km^{2}). The racial makeup of the town was 92.24% White, 5.33% Black or African American, 0.30% Native American, 0.61% Asian, 0.02% Pacific Islander, 0.85% from other races, and 0.64% from two or more races. Hispanic or Latino of any race were 11.15% of the population.

There were 2,422 households, out of which 31.3% had children under the age of 18 living with them, 49.9% were married couples living together, 10.6% had a female householder with no husband present, and 34.6% were non-families. 28.0% of all households were made up of individuals, and 11.8% had someone living alone who was 65 years of age or older. The average household size was 2.46 and the average family size was 3.01.

In the town, the population was spread out, with 18.7% under the age of 18, 24.3% from 18 to 24, 29.9% from 25 to 44, 18.3% from 45 to 64, and 8.8% who were 65 years of age or older. The median age was 30 years. For every 100 females, there were 185.9 males. For every 100 females age 18 and over, there were 210.9 males.

The median income for a household in the town was $37,830, and the median income for a family was $46,189. Males had a median income of $37,823 versus $26,859 for females. The per capita income for the town was $16,830. About 9.5% of families and 12.9% of the population were below the poverty line, including 15.7% of those under age 18 and 16.2% of those age 65 or over.

== Communities and locations in the town of Coxsackie ==
- Bronck House – A house in West Coxsackie built by Pieter Bronck in 1663 (open as a museum)
- Coxsackie – The village of Coxsackie
- Reed Street Historic District is a national historic district located in Coxsackie's village proper on the west bank of the Hudson River, Greene County. The district contains 30 contributing buildings. They are a collection of mid-19th century, two and three story commercial buildings. The district displays a uniformity of style in its Italianate style brick facades with ornate brackets and overhanging eaves. Recently, new, independently owned businesses have opened on Reed Street bringing Coxsackie's historic downtown back to life.
- Riverside Park- located at the end of Reed Street in Coxsackie Village. This park offers expansive views of the mighty Hudson River. A boat launch allows easy load-in and load-out for motor boats, canoes, and kayaks (with plenty of parking). Seasonal docks are put out for warm season fishing and sunning. A Farmer's Market is held here on Wednesday evenings during the summer months of May to October- offering farm produce and goods, a weekly visiting food truck, and live music.
- Climax – A hamlet northwest of Coxsackie village on State Route 81
- Earlton – A hamlet in the western part of the town. The Forestville Commonwealth Owenite community at Earlton was listed on the National Register of Historic Places in 1974.
- Hudson River Islands State Park
- Surprise – A hamlet at the western town line.
- Sleepy Hollow Lake – A lake partly in the southern part of the town (a "resort" development)
- West Coxsackie – A hamlet northwest of Coxsackie village on Route 81
- Coxsackie Correctional Facility – A state prison southwest of Coxsackie village
- Greene Correctional Facility -a state prison adjacent to Coxsackie Correctional Facility

== Sports ==
- Coxsackie Speedway was a 1/4-mile (0.40 km) paved oval facility opened in 1952 by Walter Parks. The facility featured stock car racing sanctioned by the Tri-City Racing Association, and operated through 1956. It was one of several venues in the Capital District which contributed to the rise in popularity of auto racing after World War II. (Note: Geolocation of Coxsackie Speedway: 42.3638°N 73.8047°W)
