= Susquehannah Turnpike =

- U.S. National Register of Historic Places
- Location within New York Location within the United States
- Location: Beginning at Catskill, follows the Mohican Trail (NY 145) and CR 20 and 22 NW to the Schoharie County line, Catskill, New York
- Coordinates: 42°18′35″N 74°0′58″W
- Area: 200 acres (81 ha)
- Built: 1800
- Architect: Susquehannah Turnpike Co.
- NRHP reference No.: 74001241
- Added to NRHP: January 2, 1974

The Susquehannah Turnpike is a historic 25 mile turnpike beginning at Catskill on the Hudson River and stretching through the town of Durham in Greene County, New York. East of the Hudson River, the road was taken over by the Ancram Turnpike Company in 1804. The route was extended west by the Susquehannah and Bath Turnpike Company, and further branches reached to Buffalo and Erie, Pennsylvania; the whole route became known as the Catskill Turnpike. Part of the Susquehannah Turnpike follows the Mohican Trail and it features a number of stone arch bridges. Nine of the 25 original milestones remain.

It was listed on the National Register of Historic Places in 1974.

== History ==
An early effort to build a road to the settlements along the Susquehanna River was begun in 1790 by the state government, funded by lotteries. This effort fell through, and a private company, the Susquehanna Turnpike Company, was chartered in 1800 to build the road "from the town of Salisbury in the state of Connecticut to Wattle's Ferry, on the Susquehannah River." The construction was toilsome and long; notably, several bridges were washed out in 1804. Despite the troubles, the turnpike was opened in 1806. Before it had opened, the portion east of the Hudson River was spun off as the Ancram Turnpike in 1804.

Immediately upon the turnpike's opening, shunpikes began to pop up to avoid the tollbooths. One notable shunpike was in Meredith, now part of Davenport, on a road now called Miller Hill Road. It was eliminated by an act relocating the local toll booth nearer to the Kortright Creek, making it impossible to avoid the tollbooth; “Shunpikers, if caught, had to pay three times the toll”. To alleviate the loss of revenue from shunpikers, toll booths began to be set up at twice the interval as before, charging half the old toll at each booth.

To extend this road beyond the Susquehanna River, the Susquehanna and Bath Turnpike Company was chartered in 1804 to run "from the Susquehanna river in the town of Jerico [now known as Bainbridge], in Chenango County, to the town of Bath, in the County of Steuben". The company experienced similar, if not worse conditions in building the road, not even having an Iroquois trail to guide them.

Beginning in the 1820s, turnpikes began to decline across the state, due to competition from the Erie Canal and railroads. This included the companies maintaining the Catskill Turnpike. The Susquehanna Turnpike Company also had the problem of being too large to maintain, and the road was so poorly maintained there was only one tollbooth that collected tolls, as was the practice for an unmaintained road, as early as 1828. The Susquehanna Turnpike was made a public road in 1856, though the company only folded in 1901.

== Modern designations ==
Except for minor local variations in the 20th century, all the road is still drivable.

Ancram Turnpike:

- State Line Road
- Dutchess CR 60
- Dutchess CR 8
- NY 82
- US 9
- Church Road
- Greendale Road

Susquehanna Turnpike:

- Main Street (old NY 23)
- NY 145
- CR 20
- Durham Road
- Potter Mountain Road
- NY 990V
- Gilboa Road
- NY 23
- Turnpike Road
- Delhi–Leonta Road
- NY 357

Stagecoaches from there could connect with the Susquehanna and Bath Turnpike along what is now NY 7

Susquehanna and Bath Turnpike:

- NY 206
- NY 79
- Schuyler CR 23
- Steuben CR 114
- Steuben CR 87
- NY 54
