= U.S. Route 9W =

U.S. Numbered Highway in New York/New Jersey

U.S. Route 9W
- Map of eastern New York and North New Jersey with US 9W highlighted in red

Route information
- Auxiliary route of US 9
- Maintained by NJDOT, NYSDOT, and the cities of Newburgh, Kingston, and Albany
- Length: 141.83 mi (228.25 km)
- Existed: 1927–present

Major junctions
- South end: I-95 / N.J. Turnpike / US 1-9 / US 46 / Route 4 in Fort Lee, NJ
- Route 67 / Palisades Parkway in Fort Lee, NJ; Palisades Parkway in Alpine, NJ; I-87 / I-287 / New York Thruway / NY 59 in Nyack, NY; US 202 in Haverstraw, NY; US 6 / US 202 / Palisades Parkway in Bear Mountain State Park, NY; I-84 / NY 52 in Newburgh, NY; US 44 / NY 55 in Highland, NY; US 209 / NY 199 in Kingston, NY; I-87 Toll / New York Thruway in New Baltimore, NY; I-87 Toll / New York Thruway / I-787 in Albany, NY; US 20 in Albany, NY
- North end: US 9 in Albany, NY

Location
- Country: United States
- States: New Jersey, New York
- Counties: NJ: Bergen; NY: Rockland, Orange, Ulster, Greene, Albany

Highway system
- United States Numbered Highway System; List; Special; Divided
← Route 9	NJ	→ Route 10
← NY 9R	NY	→ NY 9X

U.S. Route 9W (US 9W) is a north–south United States Numbered Highway in the states of New Jersey and New York. It begins in Fort Lee, New Jersey, as Fletcher Avenue crosses the US 1/9, US 46, and Interstate 95 (I-95) approaches to the George Washington Bridge, and heads north up the west side of the Hudson River to US 9 in Albany, New York. As its "W" suffix indicates, US 9W is a westerly alternate route of US 9 between the two locations. US 9W directly serves three cities—Newburgh, Kingston, and Albany—and enters the vicinity of several others. As the route heads north, it connects to several highways of regional importance, including I-84, US 209, New York State Route 23 (NY 23), and US 20. Much of US 9W parallels the New York State Thruway and NY 32; additionally, the latter overlaps with US 9W in four locations.

== Route description ==
For much of its length, US 9W is a two-lane surface road. However, some stretches in New Jersey and New York widen to four lanes, and much of the highway in Orange County is like an expressway even if not so designated.

=== New Jersey ===
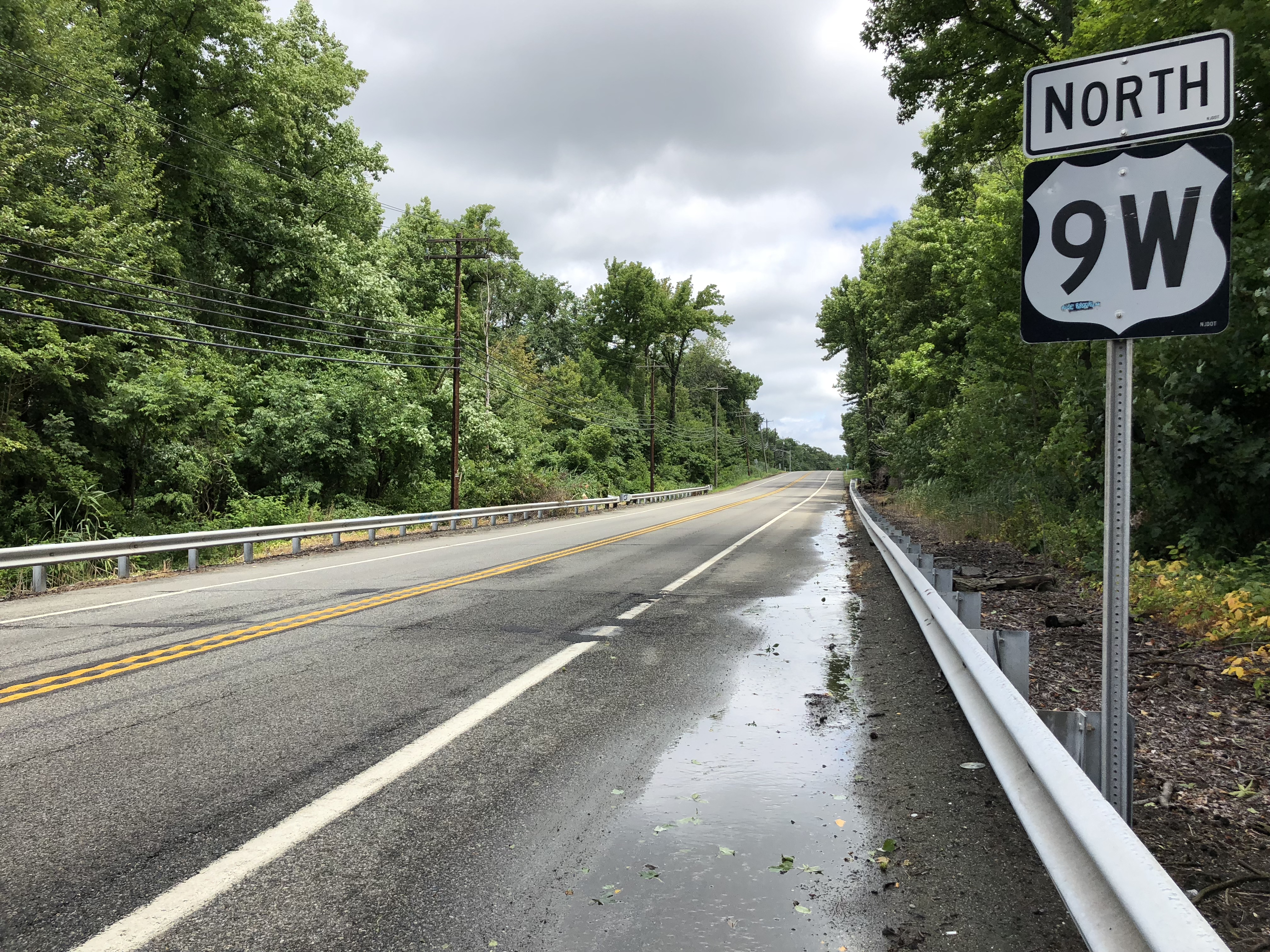
View north along US 9W between the Esplanade and Hillside Avenue in Alpine, New Jersey

US 9W begins as a four-lane road. Heading north on Fletcher Avenue (from Kelby Street intersection, near the George Washington Bridge) in Fort Lee, US 9W occupies the right-of-way of the Palisades Interstate Parkway (PIP) to Lemoine Avenue, the northern terminus of Route 67. US 9W exits the right-of-way, turning north onto Lemoine Avenue, later Sylvan Avenue, in Englewood Cliffs, where it passes the headquarters of Ferrari of North America, Unilever, and CNBC. As the roadway enters Tenafly from Englewood Cliffs, it reduces to a two lane roadway from four lanes. It continues to parallel the PIP to its west as they progress northward along the west bank of the Hudson River until reaching the border with New York. Both roads run very near the top of the Palisades, occasionally offering views of New York City and the river.

Lemoine Avenue is heavy with commercial development in the Coytesville section of Fort Lee, but, as the road runs into Englewood Cliffs, it transitions to corporate office buildings. Into the affluent community of Alpine in the state's northeastern corner, it becomes more residential. Near Norwood, just south of the state line, US 9W crosses under the parkway and enters New York. Before the construction of the PIP, US 9W used to follow a route through the State Line Lookout at the New Jersey–New York border which is now accessible only from the parkway.

The entire route of US 9W in New Jersey is within Bergen County.

=== New York ===
==== Rockland County ====
Across the state line, US 9W continues in Palisades as Highland Avenue, a two-lane road through mostly residential suburban surroundings. It passes Columbia University's Lamont–Doherty Earth Observatory and then Tallman Mountain State Park. Bending westward to Sparkill, it meets NY 340.

It returns to the riverside at Piermont, where it takes the name Broadway Avenue. Running due north, it enters Nyack and meets with the New York State Thruway (I-87 and I-287) just west of the Tappan Zee Bridge. It then runs along the thruway to the east terminus of NY 59 in downtown Nyack, where it becomes North Highland Avenue once again. North of Upper Nyack, it passes Rockland Lake through Valley Cottage and then Rockland Lake State Park.

Alongside the park, it crosses town lines again. NY 303 reaches its north end just after the park and, after a tight curve NY 304, reaches its northern terminus as well.

US 9W then returns to the riverside briefly, trending away from it into Haverstraw under the name Congers Avenue. The village is followed immediately by West Haverstraw, where US 202 comes in at an oblique angle and joins US 9W, creating the first concurrency along the route.

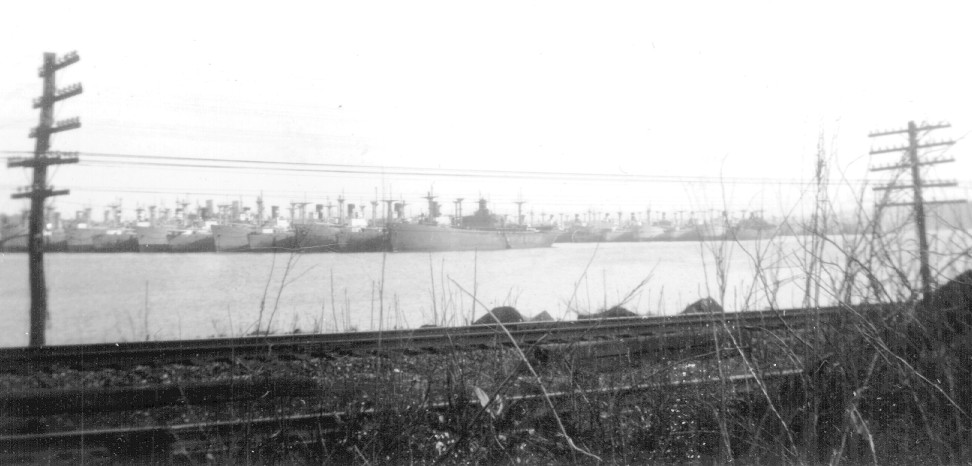
Hudson River Mothball Fleet

The combined highways head north from the Haverstraws as South, then North, Liberty Drive, passing Stony Point Battlefield. They return to the Hudson at Tomkins Cove, where the Hudson River National Defense Reserve Fleet was moored from 1947 to 1971. Between Tomkins Cove and Jones Point there are two large ship anchors surrounding a monument alongside the road that marks the spot which is just across from Indian Point Energy Center in Buchanan.

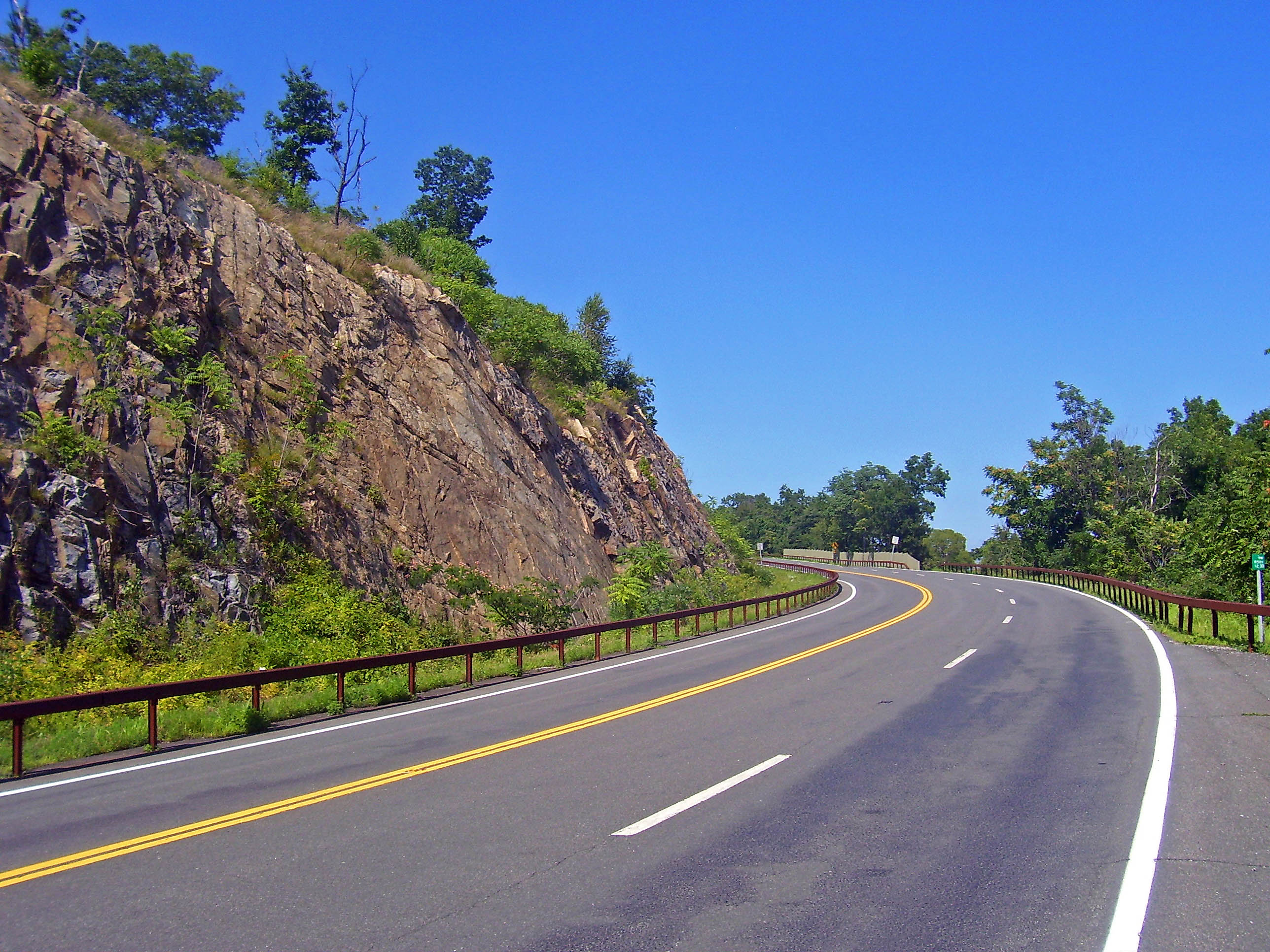
US 9W climbing Dunderberg Mountain in northern Rockland County.

At Jones Point, the road curves and bends above the river as it works its way around Dunderberg Mountain, the southernmost peak of the Hudson Highlands and part of Bear Mountain State Park.

At Iona Island, it levels out again briefly and then US 9W/US 202 climbs to the heart of the state park at Bear Mountain Inn and Hessian Lake, where the Appalachian Trail crosses beneath the road in the only artificial tunnel along its entire route. The Orange County line is crossed just before Bear Mountain Circle.

==== Orange County ====
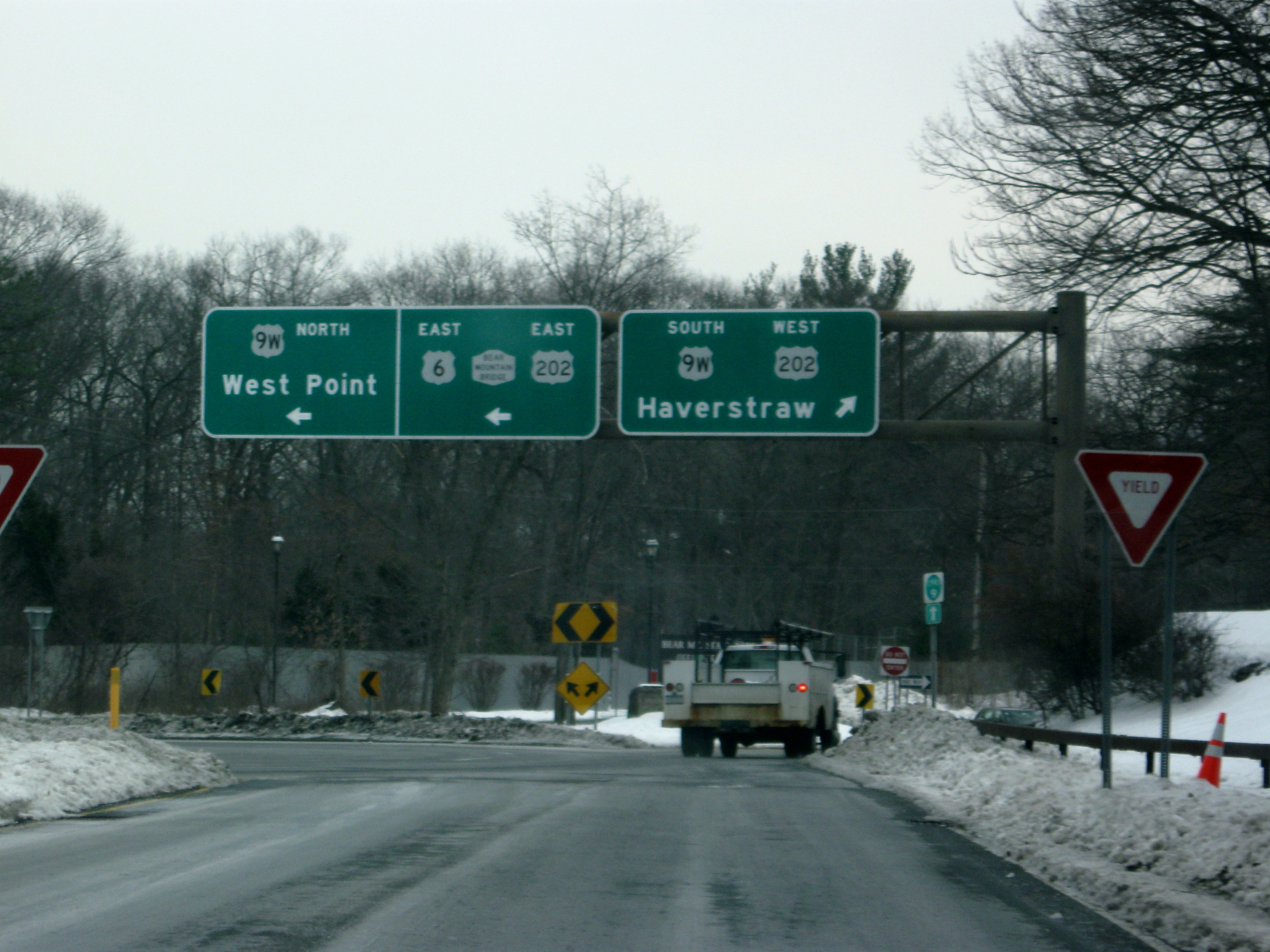
US 9W, as seen from the north end of the PIP at the Bear Mountain Circle in Fort Montgomery

The circle marks the northern terminus of the PIP and the junction with US 6. US 202 leaves US 9W to join US 6 here and cross the Bear Mountain Bridge. North of the circle, US 9W continues as a four-lane surface road, crossing Popolopen Creek and affording views of the similarly named Torne. It passes first the historic Fort Montgomery, then enters the small hamlet of the same name, distinguished by a post office, gas station, and some other small businesses.

After becoming a four-lane expressway, NY 218 (Storm King Highway), the former route of US 9W, forks off to the right, carrying traffic to Highland Falls and the U.S. Military Academy (USMA) at West Point. US 9W then starts to climb the highlands above the village and the academy. The following exit is also for NY 218, which joins US 9W for a mile (1.6 km) just north of the village. It leaves the highway at the northern terminus of NY 293 to run alongside Storm King Mountain.

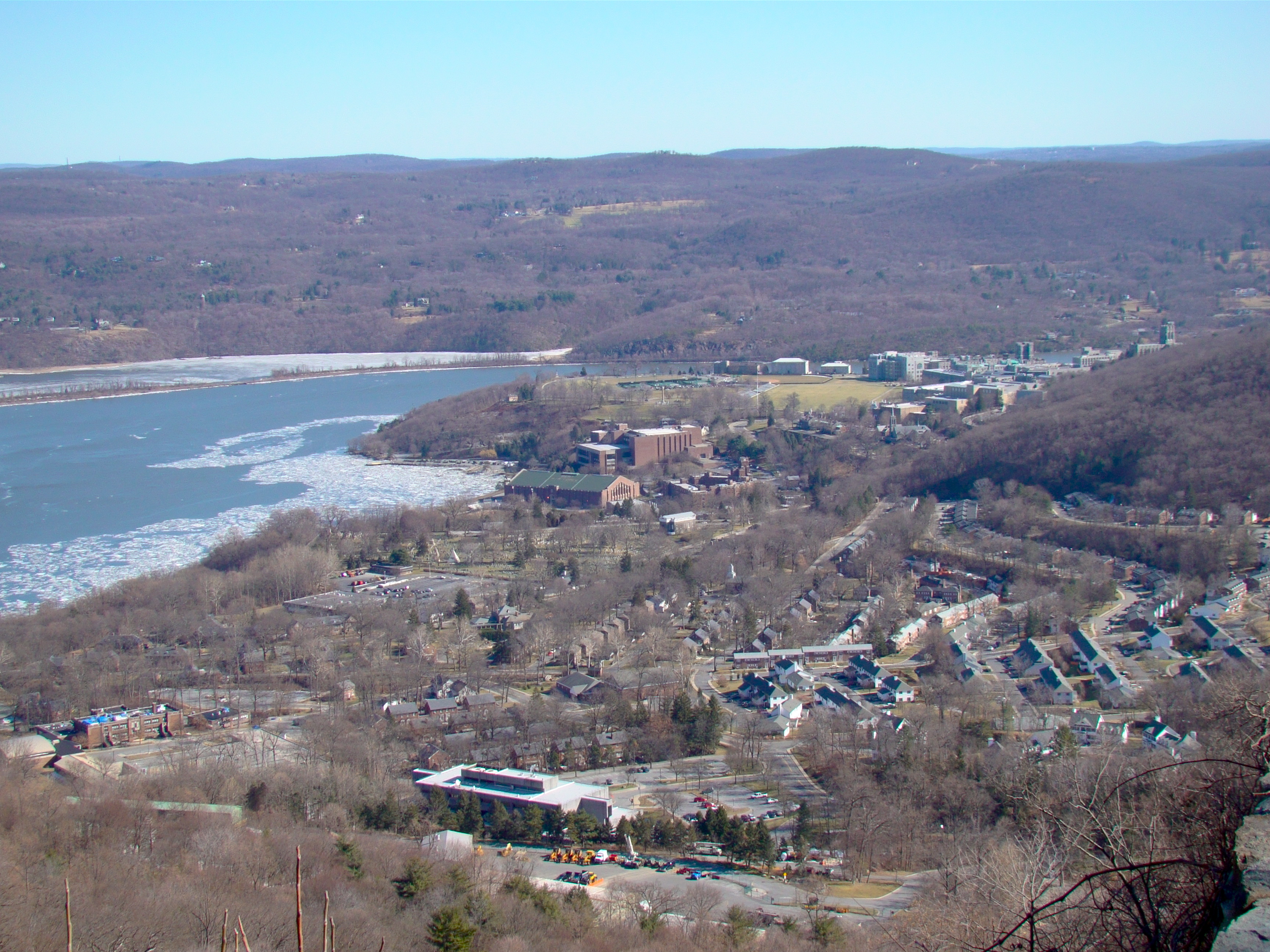
The USMA viewed from US 9W just before passing over Crow's Nest

From here, US 9W continues its ascent, offering sweeping views over the river and highlands, with an overlook available to northbound drivers. The surrounding land is all woods, part of the vast USMA property. After passing Crow's Nest, Storm King and the rocky cliff faces of Butter Hill dominate the northward view. Another parking lot allows travelers to stop and sightsee, as well as hike the Stillman Trail up the two peaks.

After Storm King, the road begins a long descent into the town of Cornwall, where it becomes a two-lane surface road before becoming a four-lane arterial road. Just outside the village of Cornwall-on-Hudson and the fields of New York Military Academy, NY 218 ends its loop. Shortly afterward, the division ends, although the road remains four lanes as it enters the town of New Windsor.

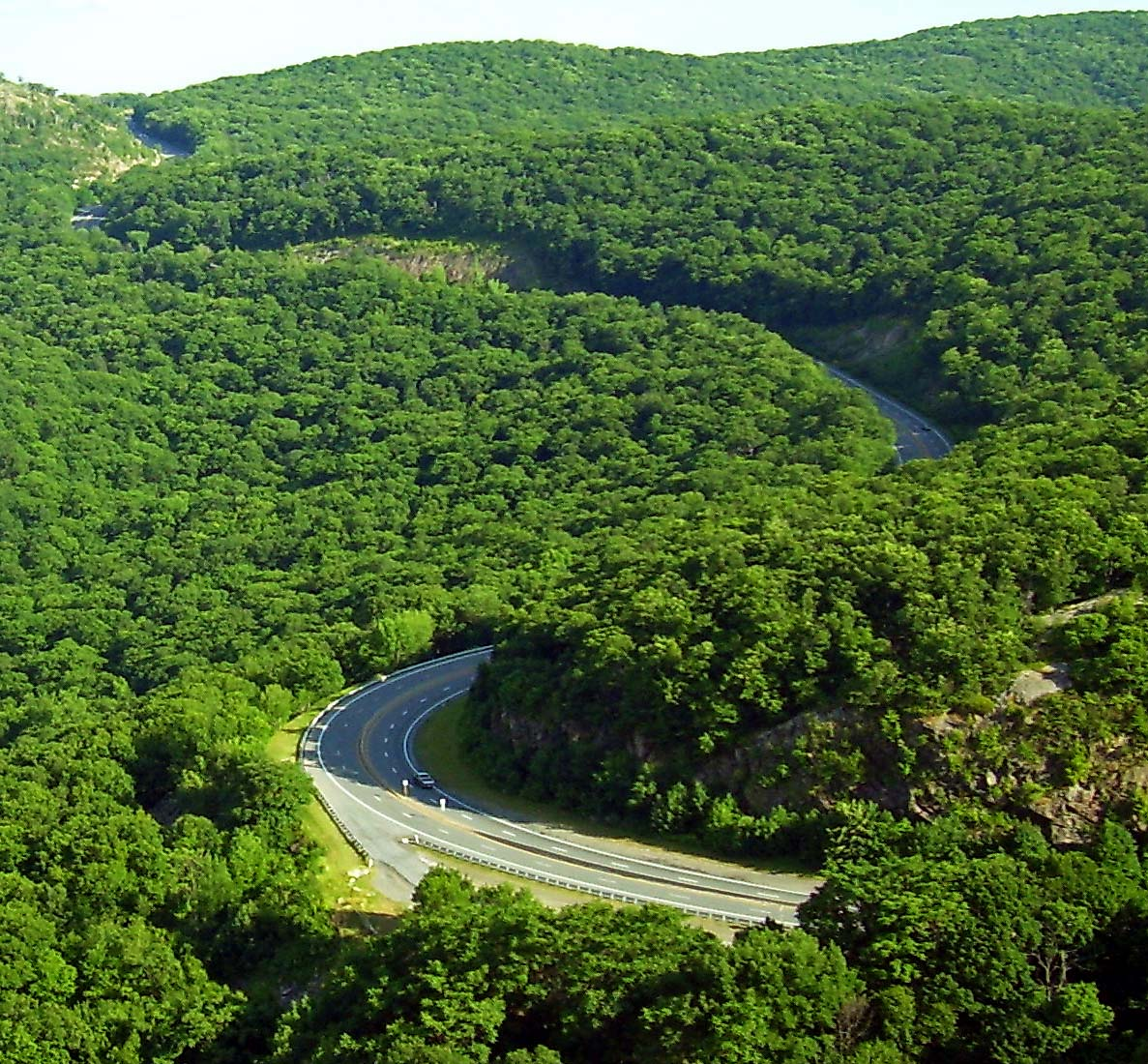
US 9W winding through the Hudson Highlands

It descends again where Breakneck Ridge and Bull Hill tower across the river. Traffic begins to slow down at the center of town, where NY 94 ends its journey across the county. After this traffic light, the road begins to narrow. Once across Quassaick Creek and into Newburgh, it is Robinson Avenue, a wide urban arterial with parking along the sides.

It ascends gently past Delano-Hitch Stadium and the associated park to the center of its passage across Newburgh, the intersection with Broadway. Here NY 17K has its eastern terminus, and NY 32, the other main surface route west of the Hudson, begins its first concurrency with US 9W.

Passing Broadway School, a former elementary school which is in the process of being converted into the City of Newburgh Court House, the two routes head into a more residential sector of the city, marked by Frederick Law Olmsted-designed Downing Park. The road's climb continues until the North campus of Newburgh Free Academy, where it starts to descend to the busy exit at I-84, visible ahead, just west of the Newburgh–Beacon Bridge. This junction, also including NY 52, is the city's northern limit.

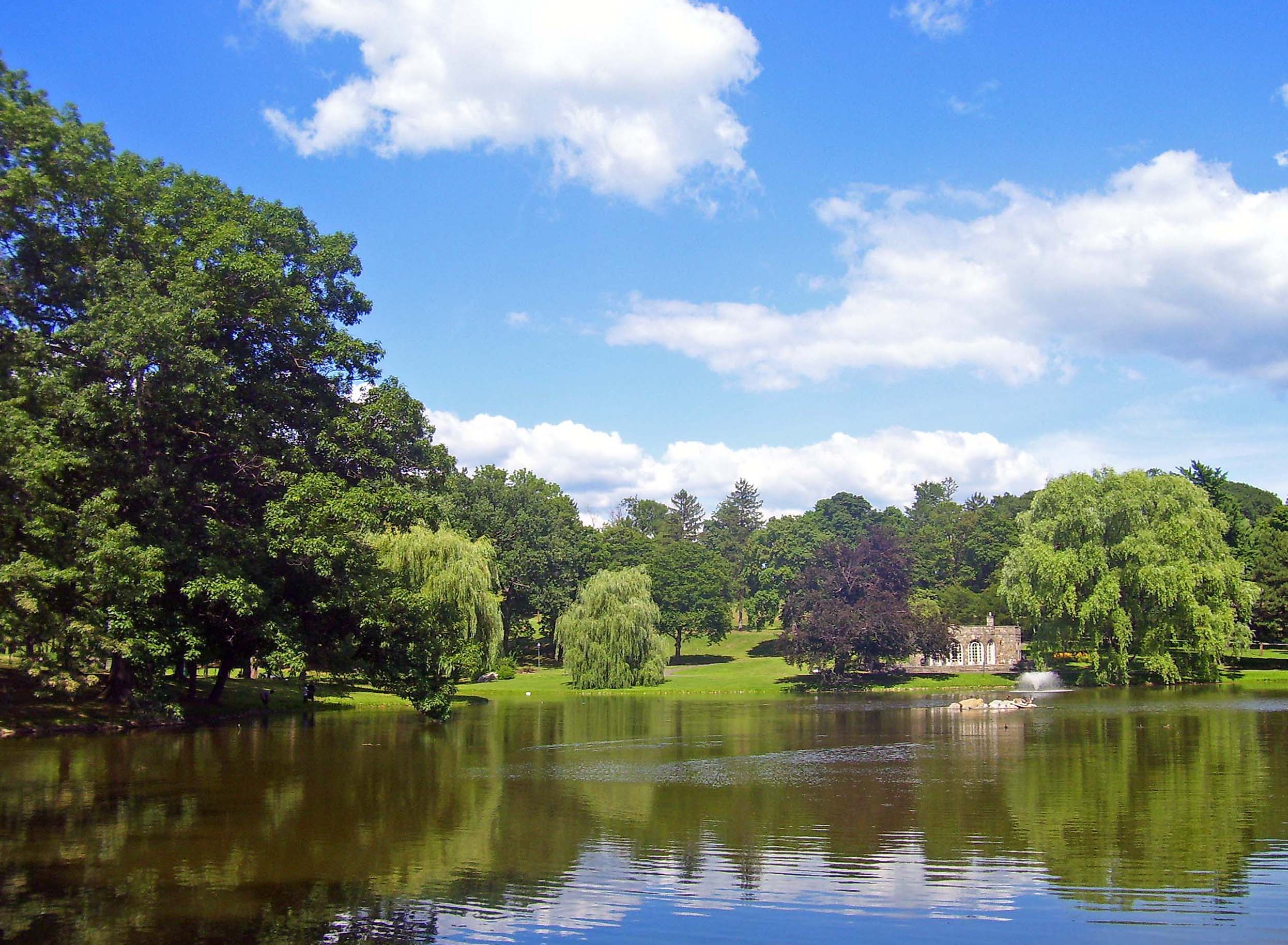
Downing Park in the city of Newburgh

Immediately after it, NY 32 leaves to the northwest while US 9W continues northward. It passes Powelton Club, part of the affluent community of Balmville, the first of several within the town of Newburgh that US 9W will pass. Middle Hope follows, as the road becomes a two-lane route with a rural feel. Development continues along the road, but there are increasingly large unbroken fields or woodlots and, finally, in the northern reaches of the town, orchards. At Roseton, past the access road to the nearby powerplants, the highway reaches the county line just past the turnoff to the Gomez Mill House, the earliest surviving Jewish home in the U.S.

==== Ulster County ====
Traffic is slowed when it passes through the hamlet of Marlboro, but otherwise there is little change in US 9W until it widens to four lanes again just south of the Mid-Hudson Bridge approach overpass. At this point, US 44 and NY 55 join the highway from the east. The road becomes a busy commercial strip for the next mile to the concurrency's end, where NY 44 and NY 55 go down into Highland. The four lanes continue, however, for several more miles until well past the eastern terminus of NY 299, the road that carries traffic west toward the thruway and New Paltz.

About two miles (3.2 km) north of that intersection, the road returns to two lanes through West Park and Esopus, passing primarily through largely undeveloped, primarily wooded countryside. It becomes more built up at Port Ewen, just south of Kingston, which it enters by crossing Rondout Creek via the John T. Loughran Bridge and becoming a four-lane expressway known as Frank Koenig Boulevard.

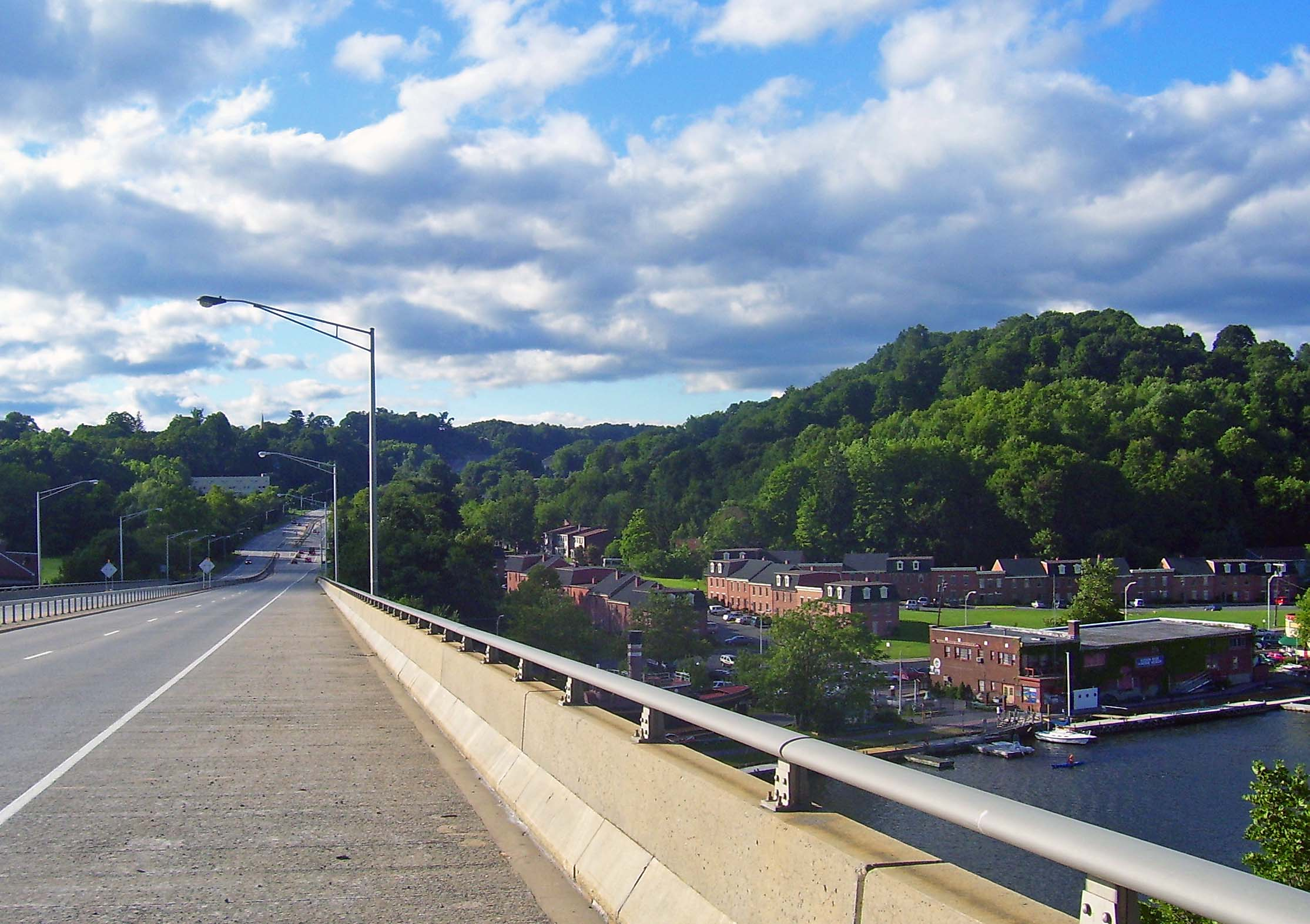
US 9W entering Kingston

It runs right through Kingston this way and meets NY 32 again at the city's northern boundary. Turning left, US 9W's second concurrency with NY 32 is only 500 feet (150 m) long as it almost immediately turns right onto East Chester Street. The road widens again, becoming a busy commercial strip. At the freeway interchange ahead for the Kingston–Rhinecliff Bridge, US 209 comes to its northern end and NY 199 its western.

In Lake Katrine, the road begins to narrow and traffic lightens. US 9W stays on a straight northward course, following alongside Esopus Creek but not crossing it, until it veers northeast to merge, once again, with NY 32.

This third concurrency finally brings the road over Esopus Creek and into the riverside village of Saugerties. Here, US 9W follows Partition Street and then Main Street when the routes part again, with NY 32 carrying NY 212 out of this junction. As Malden Avenue, the highway continues north alongside the river once again, passing through the hamlet of Malden-on-Hudson on its way up into Greene County.

==== Greene County and north ====
In Catskill, US 9W meets with NY 23A, then NY 385 at its southern terminus, and then, a mile (1.6 km) north, NY 23.

In Coxsackie, US 9W meets this time with the northern terminus of NY 385, as well as the eastern terminus of NY 81. In West Coxsackie, US 9W meets with the New York State Thruway (I-87). Further north, the route meets NY 144, and in the village of Ravena, it meets NY 143.

NY 396 meets US 9W in Selkirk. After briefly joining with NY 32 again, US 9W meets I-787 south of Albany. Immediately thereafter, NY 443 joins US 9W until Madison Avenue (US 20), where NY 443 ends. US 9W, however, continues on, meeting with NY 5 (junction not signed on NY 5) before ending at US 9 (Clinton Avenue).

== History ==
=== Origins ===
In New York, much of what is now US 9W was designated as Route 3, an unsigned legislative route, by the New York State Legislature in 1908. The route extended from the New Jersey state line at Orangetown and went northward through the Hudson Valley to the city of Albany. Route 3 broke from modern US 9W in several locations, mostly in areas where the route has since been moved onto bypasses. In Clarkstown, Route 3 veered west to serve Congers via Lake and Old Haverstraw Roads. From Highland Falls to Cornwall-on-Hudson, Route 3 followed modern NY 218 around Storm King Mountain. Lastly, Route 3 utilized current NY 385 between Catskill and Coxsackie. This route north of Route 3 was altered slightly on March 1, 1921, to bypass Congers on modern US 9W. When the first set of posted routes in New York were assigned in 1924, all of legislative Route 3 south of Ravena was designated as part of NY 10. From Ravena to Albany, however, NY 10 followed a more easterly alignment along what is now NY 143, NY 144, and NY 32. This route had previously been signed as part of the West Shore Route auto trail north of Newburgh.

The New Jersey segment of modern US 9W was originally designated as part of Route 18N in 1923, a route that ran from Hoboken to the New York state line at Alpine via Fort Lee. In the 1927 New Jersey state highway renumbering, Route 18N was truncated northward to Fort Lee. At the time, present-day County Route 501 (CR 501) north of Fort Lee was part of Route 1. In 1929, Route 18N was supplanted by a realigned Route 1. The Route 1 designation remained in place until the 1953 New Jersey state highway renumbering when it was removed to eliminate overlaps with several routes, including US 9W.

=== Designation ===
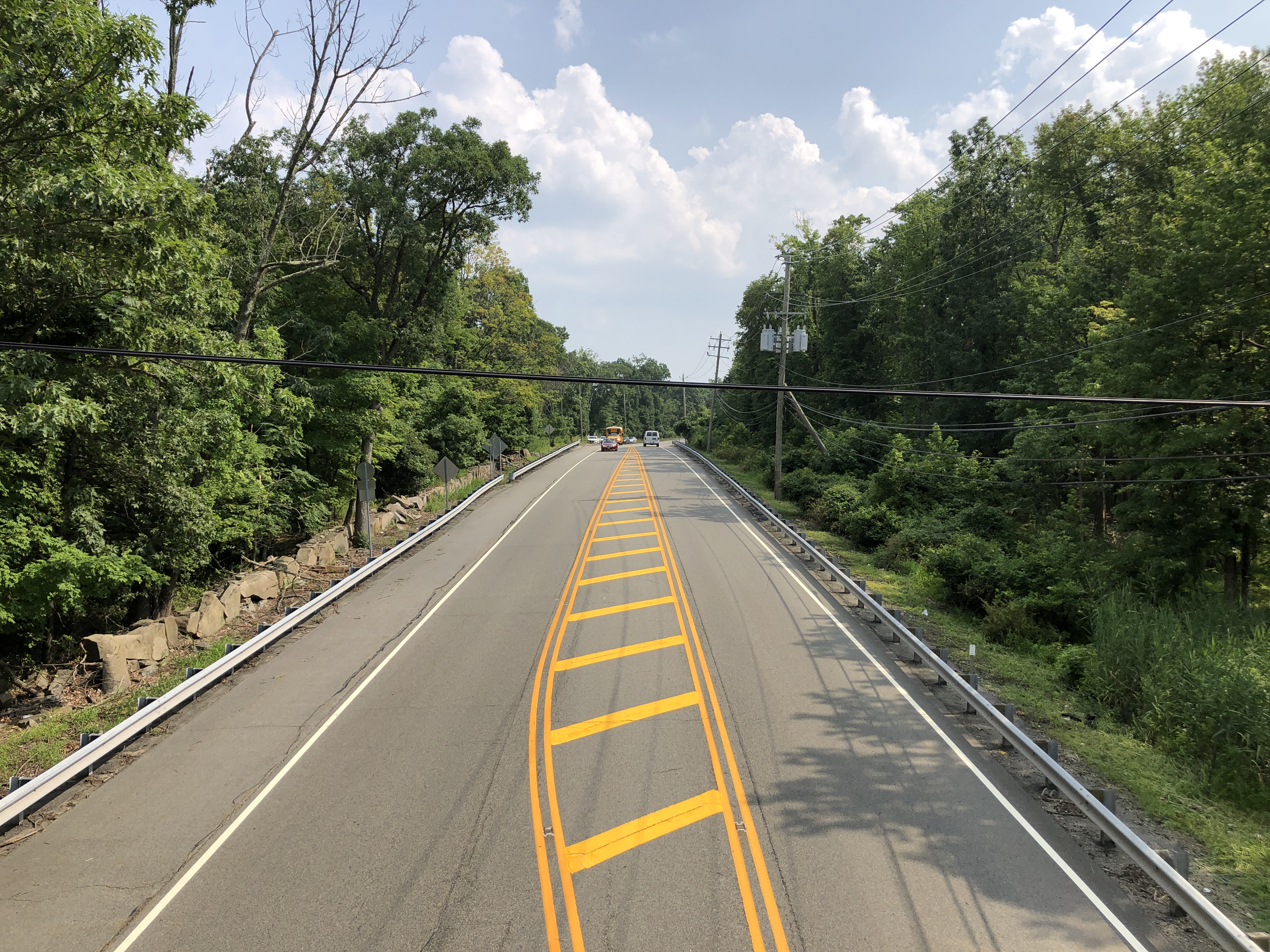
US 9W southbound in Alpine, New Jersey

In the original 1925 plan for the U.S. Numbered Highway System, US 9 was designated along the west bank of the Hudson River from Fort Lee to Albany, utilizing Route 18N in New Jersey and NY 10 in New York. The alignment of US 9 in northern New Jersey and New York remained unchanged in the final system alignment approved on November 11, 1926. However, when US 9 was commissioned in 1927, it was split into two branches between Bergen County, New Jersey, and Waterford, New York. The west branch began in Ridgefield and continued to the New York state line on modern Route 93 and CR 501, bypassing Fort Lee to the west. At the state line, the west branch of US 9 became US 9W and followed a short piece of what is now NY 340 to Sparkill.

Past Sparkill, US 9W used what was originally planned as US 9 north to Waterford, utilizing modern NY 32 from Albany to Waterford. The east branch of US 9 initially followed Route 5 east from Ridgefield to Edgewater, where it followed the Edgewater Ferry to the New York state line in the Hudson River. The branch resumed at the northern New York City line as US 9E and continued to Waterford on what is now US 9 and US 4 along the eastern side of the river. At Waterford, the two branches converged and continued north toward the Canada–United States border as a unified US 9.

=== Early changes ===
The two branches of US 9 in New Jersey were altered several times over the next decade. At some point between 1927 and 1929, the west branch of US 9 was reconfigured in Bergen County to enter Fort Lee from the south on Palisade Avenue (current Route 67) and proceed north from Fort Lee to New York on Route 18N (later Route 1). The portion of US 9W in New York south of Sparkill was altered accordingly to meet the realigned US 9. In the early 1930s, the east branch of US 9 was shifted southward to reach New York via modern Route 139 and the Holland Tunnel while the west branch of the route was realigned to follow what is now US 1/9 between the Tonnele Circle and Fort Lee. US 9W was extended southward into New Jersey c. 1932, replacing the west branch of US 9. US 9 was rerouted c. 1934 to follow US 9W and the George Washington Bridge to New York; as a result, US 9W was cut back to its current southern terminus in Fort Lee.

In the 1930 renumbering of state highways in New York, US 9W was truncated southward to end in Albany while US 9E was redesignated as just US 9 and reconfigured to bypass Waterford to the west in favor of a direct alignment between Albany and Round Lake. At the same time, US 9W was realigned through New Baltimore and Coeymans to use modern NY 144 instead. The portion of what is now US 9W from New Baltimore to Albany was originally designated as NY 144 as part of the 1930 renumbering while the segment from Catskill to Coxsackie was assigned NY 385 c. 1932. The alignments of US 9W and NY 385 were swapped by the following year while the routings of US 9W and NY 144 were flipped in April 1935.

=== Bypasses ===
In the early 1930s, plans were made by the state of New York to construct a new highway between the Bear Mountain Bridge and Cornwall-on-Hudson that would bypass both Cornwall-on-Hudson and Highland Falls and bypass the narrow Storm King Highway, US 9W's original routing between the two. On April 8, 1934, three people were killed by a rockslide on the Storm King Highway, expediting plans for the new highway, known as the Storm King Cutoff. The southernmost two miles (3.2 km) of the highway—from the bridge to just north of Fort Montgomery—utilized the existing right-of-way of US 9W, which was widened from two to four lanes and straightened through the construction of rock cuts. Construction on this segment was completed in 1937.

The portion of the bypass from Fort Montgomery to Cornwall-on-Hudson, with the exception of a one-mile (1.6 km) stretch northwest of Highland Falls, was constructed on a new alignment. It was built with four lanes and constructed along the sides of Storm King Mountain and other, smaller hills in the area. The high elevation of the roadway gave rise to a bevy of scenic, panoramic views that stretched for several miles into the distance; as a result, a fifth lane was added in some areas to allow motorists to stop and view the scenery. Like the section south of Fort Montgomery, the one-mile (1.6 km) stretch that utilized the original US 9W was widened to four lanes as well. Several interchanges were built along the route, including with NY 293 and NY 307. The cutoff was opened to traffic from Fort Montgomery to NY 293 sometime in 1939 or 1940 and to Angola Road (CR 9) on September 26, 1940. The last section, from Angola Road north to Blooming Grove Turnpike north of Cornwall-on-Hudson, was opened to traffic on May 31, 1941. US 9W was realigned to follow the cutoff while its old route via the Storm King Highway became NY 218.

Bypasses have also been proposed or constructed in other locations. In Kingston, US 9W was originally routed on Wurts Street, McEntee Street, Broadway, and East Chester Street. An easterly bypass of the city between Wurts Street and NY 32 was constructed in the late 1970s and completed as a realignment of US 9W by 1981. The portion of US 9W's former alignment south of Abeel Street in Kingston became NY 984D, an unsigned reference route. In Albany, the north end of US 9W and part of US 9 would have been rerouted onto a proposed limited-access highway called the Mid-Crosstown Arterial. The project was eventually canceled.

== Major intersections ==
State	County	Location	mi	km	Destinations	Notes
New Jersey	Bergen	Fort Lee	0.00	0.00	I-95 / N.J. Turnpike south / US 1-9 / US 46 to I-80 west – George Washington Bridge, New York City	Southern terminus; northern terminus of N.J. Turnpike; exits 72-74 on I-95
New Jersey	Bergen	Fort Lee	0.17	0.27	Route 4 west	Interchange; eastern terminus of Route 4
New Jersey	Bergen	Fort Lee	0.65	1.05	Palisades Parkway north	Interchange; northbound exit and southbound entrance; access via Route 445S
New Jersey	Bergen	Fort Lee	0.65	1.05	Route 67 south	Interchange; southbound exit and northbound entrance; northern terminus of Route 67
New Jersey	Bergen	Englewood Cliffs	2.19	3.52	CR 505 (Palisade Avenue) to Palisades Parkway – Englewood	
New Jersey	Bergen	Alpine	7.19	11.57	CR 502 west (Closter Dock Road) – Closter, Westwood	Eastern terminus of CR 502
New Jersey	Bergen	Alpine	7.77	12.50	Palisades Parkway	Exit 2 on Palisades Parkway
New Jersey	Bergen	Alpine	9.75	15.69	Palisades Parkway	Exit 3 on Palisades Parkway
New Jersey	Bergen	Alpine	10.46– 10.84	16.83– 17.45	Palisades Parkway	Exit 4 on Palisades Parkway
			11.87 0.00	19.10 0.00	New Jersey–New York state line	
New York	Rockland	Orangetown			NY 340 – Sparkill	Access via Highland Avenue; northbound exit and southbound entrance
New York	Rockland	Piermont	2.63	4.23	NY 340 – Sparkill	Access via Hickey Street/Highland Avenue
New York	Rockland	South Nyack	5.99	9.64	I-87 / I-287 / New York Thruway – Governor Mario M. Cuomo Bridge, New York City, Albany	Exit 10 on I-87 / I-287 / Thruway
New York	Rockland	Nyack	7.11	11.44	NY 59 west to I-87 Toll south / I-287 Toll east / New York Thruway south – Governor Mario M. Cuomo Bridge, New York City	Eastern terminus of NY 59
New York	Rockland	Nyack	7.21	11.60	I-87 north / I-287 west / New York Thruway north – Albany	Access via High Avenue; exit 11 on I-87 / I-287 / Thruway
New York	Rockland	Clarkstown	12.81	20.62	NY 303 south – West Nyack, Congers	Northern terminus of NY 303
New York	Rockland	Clarkstown	13.42	21.60	NY 304 south – New City	Northern terminus of NY 304
New York	Rockland	Village of Haverstraw	15.87	25.54	Westside Avenue (NY 981F north)	
New York	Rockland	Village of Haverstraw	16.27	26.18	US 202 west – Suffern	Southern end of US 202 concurrency
New York	Rockland	Stony Point			To Seven Lakes Drive south – Bear Mountain State Park	Access via South Entrance Road
New York	Rockland	Stony Point			Seven Lakes Drive south – Bear Mountain State Park	Southbound exit and northbound entrance; northern terminus of Seven Lakes Drive
New York	Orange	Highlands	26.67	42.92	US 6 / US 202 east (Bear Mountain Bridge) / Palisades Parkway south – Peekskill, Cold Spring, Central Valley, New Jersey US 6 Truck begins	Bear Mountain Circle; northern end of US 202 concurrency; eastern terminus of US 6 Truck; northern terminus of Palisades Parkway
New York	Orange	Highlands	28.46	45.80	Old State Road (NY 980U north)	
New York	Orange	Highlands	28.46	45.80	Southern end of limited-access section	
New York	Orange	Highland Falls	29.36	47.25	NY 218 north – West Point, Highland Falls	Southern terminus of NY 218
New York	Orange	Highlands	31.31	50.39	NY 218 south – West Point, Highland Falls	Southern end of NY 218 concurrency
New York	Orange	Highlands	32.07	51.61	NY 218 north / NY 293 south / US 6 Truck west – Central Valley	Northern end of NY 218/US 6 Truck concurrency; northern terminus of NY 293
New York	Orange	Cornwall	37.62	60.54	Angola Road (CR 9)	
New York	Orange	Cornwall	38.06	61.25	Quaker Avenue (CR 107) to NY 32 – Cornwall, Storm King Art Center	Former NY 307; hamlet of Firthcliffe; NY 32 not signed northbound
New York	Orange	Cornwall			Northern end of limited-access section	
New York	Orange	Cornwall	38.66	62.22	Willow Avenue (CR 32)	Interchange; hamlet of Firthcliffe
New York	Orange	Cornwall	39.51	63.59	NY 218 south – Cornwall	Interchange; northern terminus of NY 218
New York	Orange	Town of New Windsor			River Road	Interchange; no southbound exit; hamlet of New Windsor
New York	Orange	Town of New Windsor	42.30	68.08	NY 94 south – Vails Gate	Northern terminus of NY 94
New York	Orange	City of Newburgh	43.22	69.56	NY 17K west / NY 32 south (Broadway) to I-87 Toll / New York Thruway	Eastern terminus of NY 17K; southern end of NY 32 concurrency
New York	Orange	City of Newburgh			South Street (NY 980P)	Former NY 52
New York	Orange	Town of Newburgh	44.52– 44.58	71.65– 71.74	I-84 / NY 52 (Newburgh–Beacon Bridge) / NY 32 north to I-87 Toll / New York Thruway – Fishkill, Danbury, New Paltz, Port Jervis, Stewart Airport	Exit 39 on I-84; northern end of NY 32 concurrency; hamlet of Balmville
New York	Ulster	Lloyd	58.47	94.10	US 44 east / NY 55 east – Mid-Hudson Bridge, Poughkeepsie	Interchange; southern end of US 44/NY 55 concurrency
New York	Ulster	Lloyd	59.03	95.00	US 44 west / NY 55 west	Northern end of US 44/NY 55 concurrency; hamlet of Highland
New York	Ulster	Lloyd	60.91	98.03	NY 299 west to I-87 Toll / New York Thruway – New Paltz	Eastern terminus of NY 299
New York	Ulster	Esopus	72.92	117.35	Old Route 9W (NY 984D north)	Former routing of US 9W; hamlet of Port Ewen
New York	Ulster	Esopus	72.92	117.35	Southern end of limited-access section	
New York	Ulster	City of Kingston	74.12	119.28	Delaware Avenue	
New York	Ulster	Ulster	75.37	121.30	Northern end of limited-access section	
New York	Ulster	Ulster	75.37	121.30	NY 32 north – Saugerties, Kingston–Rhinecliff Bridge	Southern end of NY 32 concurrency
New York	Ulster	City of Kingston	75.65	121.75	NY 32 south – Tillson	Northern end of NY 32 concurrency
New York	Ulster	Ulster	76.96	123.86	Ulster Avenue (NY 981M south)	
New York	Ulster	Ulster	78.04	125.59	US 209 south / NY 199 east to I-87 Toll / New York Thruway / US 9 / NY 9G – Rhinecliff Bridge, Ellenville	Interchange; northern terminus of US 209; western terminus of NY 199
New York	Ulster	Town of Saugerties	83.70	134.70	NY 32 south – Glasco	Southern end of NY 32 concurrency
New York	Ulster	Village of Saugerties	85.92	138.27	NY 32 north / NY 212 west to I-87 Toll / New York Thruway	Northern end of NY 32 concurrency; eastern terminus of NY 212
New York	Greene	Village of Catskill	96.33	155.03	NY 23A west – Tannersville, Hunter	Eastern terminus of NY 23A
New York	Greene	Village of Catskill	96.88	155.91	NY 385 north – Downtown Catskill	Southern terminus of NY 385
New York	Greene	Town of Catskill	98.13	157.92	NY 23 to I-87 Toll / New York Thruway / US 9 / NY 9G – Rip Van Winkle Bridge, Cairo, Hudson	Interchange
New York	Greene	Town of Coxsackie	107.54	173.07	NY 81 west / NY 385 south – Greenville, Coxsackie	Eastern terminus of NY 81; northern terminus of NY 385
New York	Greene	Town of Coxsackie	107.74	173.39	Mansion Street Extension (NY 910U south)	Former routing of US 9W
New York	Greene	Town of New Baltimore	109.73	176.59	I-87 Toll / New York Thruway	Exit 21B on I-87 / Thruway
New York	Greene	Town of New Baltimore	112.02	180.28	NY 144 north – New Baltimore	Southern terminus of NY 144
New York	Albany	Ravena	115.03	185.12	NY 143 – Westerlo, Ravena	
New York	Albany	Bethlehem	120.74	194.31	NY 396 to I-87 Toll / New York Thruway – South Bethlehem, Selkirk	Hamlet of Beckers Corners
New York	Albany	Bethlehem	125.91	202.63	NY 32 south – Delmar	Interchange; southern end of NY 32 concurrency
New York	Albany	Bethlehem	126.30	203.26	NY 32 north	Northern end of NY 32 concurrency
New York	Albany	Albany	127.10	204.55	I-87 Toll / New York Thruway / I-787 north – Rensselaer, Troy	Exit 23 on I-87 / Thruway; exit 1 on I-787
New York	Albany	Albany	127.96	205.93	NY 443 west (Delaware Avenue)	Southern end of NY 443 concurrency
New York	Albany	Albany	129.31	208.10	US 20 (Madison Avenue) NY 443 ends	Eastern terminus of NY 443
New York	Albany	Albany	129.68	208.70	NY 5 (Washington Avenue)	
New York	Albany	Albany	129.96	209.15	US 9 (Clinton Avenue)	Northern terminus
1.000 mi = 1.609 km; 1.000 km = 0.621 mi: Concurrency terminus; Electronic toll collection

== See also ==
- List of reference routes in New York
