= Lake Creek (New York) =

Location
- Country: United States
- State: New York
- County: Albany, Schoharie
- Towns: Rensselaerville, Broome

Physical characteristics
- Source
  - location: Rensselaerville State Forest, Rensselaerville, NY
  - coordinates: 42°30′13″N 74°11′46″W
- Mouth: Catskill Creek
  - location: Livingstonville, NY
  - coordinates: 42°29′09″N 74°16′11″W
  - elevation: 1,040 ft (320 m)

Lake Creek is a 5.8-mile-long (9.3 km) tributary of Catskill Creek in Albany and Schoharie counties, New York, in the United States. Via Catskill Creek, it is part of the Hudson River watershed. Lake Creek runs from the Rensselaerville State Forest in the town of Rensselaerville to Catskill Creek at Livingstonville in the town of Broome.

== See also ==
- List of rivers of New York
