= List of places named Vlaie =

In the Hudson Valley of eastern United States, a vlaie, vly /vlaɪ/ or fly /flaɪ/ is a swamp or marsh. It also applies to creeks and areas in the vicinities. The term appears in place names in areas of Dutch influence, formerly New Netherland.

== Etymology ==
The terms are from a dialectal form of the Middle Dutch word valeye ("valley", spelled vallei in Modern Dutch). However, the meaning shifted to "swamp" when used by New Netherlanders. Variants such as vley and vlei are also found. The English spelling of vleigh is probably under influence of rhymes like sleigh and weigh.

The Afrikaans word vlei ("shallow lake") is a cognate, descended from the same Middle Dutch word. The Vlie, a channel in Frisia, may not be related, as it is likely from the Latin Flevo.

== Place names ==
Examples of names of swamps, streams, lakes, and mountains which contain vlaie or other variant spellings:

=== New York ===
V

- Franklinton Vlaie: a swamp in Schoharie County which feeds the Catskill Creek.
- The Vlaie: the area surrounding the Franklington Vlaie.
- Vly Mountain, one of the Catskill High Peaks, in Greene County.
- Gayhead Vly: a swamp in Greene County near Leeds.
- Great Vly: a swamp in Greene County which feeds the Sawyer Kill.
- Vly Creek: a stream in Delaware County.
- Vly Creek: a stream in Albany County.
- The Vly: an upland area in Marbletown, Ulster County.
- Vly Road: a road in Albany County.
- Vleigh Place: a street in Kew Gardens Hills in Queens County.
- Vly Swamp: a swamp in Ulster County.
- Consalus Vly: a swamp in Saratoga County.
- Ireland Vly: previously a swamp in Saratoga County, now a reservoir.
- Miner Mill Vly: a beaver flow in Saratoga County.
- Burnt Vly: a swamp in Fulton County near Stratford.
- Racker Vly: a beaver flow in Fulton County.
- Fifteen typonyms for swamps in Hamilton County.

F

- Fly Creek, Fly Summit, and Fly Swamp (also known as Vly Creek, Vly Summit, and Vly Swamp), Washington County.
- Fly Creek: A creek in Otsego County, New York.
- Fly Market in New York City: may be the source of flea market.
- Fly Creek, Fly Pond, and Fly Brook in Broome County.
- Fly Swamp, or Vly Swamp, or "The Vly": a swamp in Washington County.
- The Fly: a swamp in Taborton, Rensselaer County.
- The Fly: a swamp in Otsego County.
- Rossman Fly: another name for Rossman Pond. Also Rossman Fly Road.
- The Old Fly: a swamp in Washington County.
- Shaw Fly: a swamp in Washington County.

=== New Jersey ===
- Bog and Vly Meadows: a swamp in Lincoln Park.
- The town of Tenafly (literally "ten swamps")
- Burnt Fly Bog: a swamp on the border of Middlesex and Monmouth Counties, New Jersey.
- Polifly (meaning "top of the meadow/atop the swamp"), the name by which Hasbrouck Heights was known during the colonial period. Polifly Road is a major thoroughfare connecting Hackensack and Hasbrouck Heights.

=== Out of use ===
- Sacandaga Vlaie: marshland now flooded by the Great Sacandaga Lake by the building of the Conklingville Dam.
- The Vlaie or "Great Marsh": south of Oneida Lake in Madison County, New York. Also known as Canaseraga Lake and was more than fifteen thousand acres before it was drained by pioneers in the 1800s by the digging of the Douglass Ditch to Lake Oneida.
- Head of the Fly: is the area in southern Flushing, Queens, New York, now known as Kew Gardens Hills. A road through the neighborhood, is still called Vleigh Place.

== See also ==
- Toponymy of New Netherland
- Toponymy of Bergen, New Netherland
