= Rensselaerville, New York =

- Town
- Etymology: For Stephen Van Rensselaer, patroon of Rensselaerswyck
- Location in Albany County and the state of New York.

- Location of New York in the United States
- Coordinates: 42°28′46″N 74°10′19″W
- Country: United States
- State: New York
- County: Albany
- Incorporation as town: 1790

Government
  - Town Supervisor: John Dolce Town Council: Brian Wood; Randy Bates; Pete Sommerville; Ed VanAuken

Area
  - Total: 61.88 sq mi (160.28 km^{2})
  - Land: 61.46 sq mi (159.19 km^{2})
  - Water: 0.42 sq mi (1.09 km^{2})
- Elevation: 1,598 ft (487 m)

Population (2020)
  - Total: 1,826
  - Density: 29.7/sq mi (11.47/km^{2})
- Time zone: UTC-5 (EST)
  - Summer (DST): UTC-4 (EDT)
- ZIP Codes: 12147 (Rensselaerville); 12120 (Medusa); 12469 (Preston Hollow); 12023 (Berne); 12083 (Greenville); 12122 (Middleburgh); 12460 (Oak Hill)
- Area code: 518
- FIPS code: 36-001-61181
- FIPS code: 36-61181
- GNIS feature ID: 0979415
- Wikimedia Commons: Rensselaerville, New York
- Website: www.rensselaerville.com

Rensselaerville (/ˈrɛnslərvɪl/) is a town in Albany County, New York, United States. The population was 1,826 at the 2020 census. The town is named after Stephen Van Rensselaer.

== History ==
Rensselaerville was once part of the Manor of Rensselaerswyck; as such, the people who farmed the land were technically leaseholders of the patroon under a feudal system, first as part of the Dutch colony of New Netherland, then under the English colony, and then U.S. state, of New York. Some of the earliest settlement in Rensselaerville was along the five Native American paths that crossed the town in the early 18th century. The southwestern corner along one of these, that connected the Hudson River to the Schoharie Valley, was the first section of the town to be settled, this would be circa 1712. This path was also the one used during wars between the Stockbridge Indians and those at Schoharie.

In 1787, the patroon had a survey and census taken in order to enroll squatters and collect the quitrent required of settlers on his lands.

Rensselaerville was created from part of the town of Watervliet in 1790. In 1795, the northern part of the town was lost to create the new town of Berne. Additional territory was lost from the eastern part of the town upon the formation of the town of Westerlo in 1815.

In 1795, after Shays' Rebellion, Daniel Shays moved from Massachusetts to Preston Hollow, a hamlet in Rensselaerville. His son became one of the leading citizens of the town.

The Conkling–Boardman–Eldridge Farm and Rensselaerville Historic District are listed on the National Register of Historic Places.

== Geography ==
According to the United States Census Bureau, the town has a total area of 61.9 square miles (160 km^{2}), of which 61.5 square miles (159 km^{2}) is land and 0.4 square miles (1.0 km^{2}) (0.63%) is water.

The southern town line is the border of Greene County, and the western town boundary is the border of Schoharie County. The town is located in the northern Catskill Mountains.

Catskill Creek and its tributaries, Lake Creek, Fox Creek, Tenmile Creek, Greene Kill and Eightmile Creek, flow through the town.

== Demographics ==
Historical population
Census	Pop.	Note	%±
1790	2,777		—
1810	5,928		—
1820	3,435		−42.1%
1830	3,685		7.3%
1840	3,705		0.5%
1850	3,629		−2.1%
1860	3,008		−17.1%
1870	2,491		−17.2%
1880	2,488		−0.1%
1890	2,112		−15.1%
1900	1,795		−15.0%
1910	1,609		−10.4%
1920	1,345		−16.4%
1930	1,203		−10.6%
1940	1,285		6.8%
1950	1,310		1.9%
1960	1,232		−6.0%
1970	1,531		24.3%
1980	1,780		16.3%
1990	1,990		11.8%
2000	1,915		−3.8%
2010	1,843		−3.8%
2020	1,826		−0.9%
U.S. Decennial Census

At the 2000 census, there were 1,915 people, 779 households, and 527 families residing in the town. The population density was 31.2 per square mile (12.0/km^{2}). There were 1,187 housing units at an average density of 19.3 per square mile (7.5/km^{2}). The racial makeup of the town was 95.98% White, 1.98% African American, 0.05% Native American, 0.16% Asian, 0.78% from other races, and 1.04% from two or more races. Hispanic or Latino of any race were 1.20% of the population.

There were 779 households, of which 29.0% had children under the age of 18 living with them, 55.5% were married couples living together, 7.6% had a female householder with no husband present, and 32.3% were non-families. 25.2% of all households were made up of individuals, and 10.7% had someone living alone who was 65 years of age or older. The average household size was 2.43 and the average family size was 2.93.

24.4% of the population were under the age of 18, 5.8% from 18 to 24, 24.0% from 25 to 44, 30.5% from 45 to 64, and 15.2% who were 65 years of age or older. The median age was 42 years. For every 100 females, there were 103.3 males. For every 100 females age 18 and over, there were 99.0 males.

The median household income was $42,391, and the median income for a family was $51,607. Males had a median income of $34,563 and females $30,298. The per capita income was $20,921. About 2.8% of families and 5.3% of the population were below the poverty line, including 6.2% of those under age 18 and 3.4% of those age 65 or over.

== Communities and locations in Rensselaerville ==
- Cooksburg – A hamlet in the southwestern part of Rensselaerville near the town line.
- Medusa – A hamlet near the town line, located east of Cooksburg.
- Potter Hollow – A hamlet near the southern town line, west of Cooksburg.
- Preston Hollow – A hamlet in the southwestern part of the town, north of Cooksburg.
- Rensselaerville – A hamlet in the northeastern part of the town.
- Shufelt Corners – A location north of Rensselaerville hamlet.
- Smiths Corner – A hamlet at the eastern town line.

== Notable people ==
- Smith A. Boughton, leader of the Anti-Rent War
- Mortimer M. Jackson, jurist and diplomat
- Rufus Lumry, abolitionist circuit preacher and early organizer of the Wesleyan Methodist Church
- Molly O'Neill, food writer and cookbook author, had a home in Rensselaerville where she hosted summer writing workshops
- William Patterson, former US Congressman
- Richard Prince, American artist
- Andy Rooney had a summer home in Rensselaerville
- Henry Chester Waite, Minnesota lawyer, banker, and politician
