= Franklinton =

Franklinton may refer to a place in the United States:

== Communities ==
- Franklinton, Georgia
- Franklinton, Louisiana
- Franklinton, New York, a populated place in the town of Broome in Schoharie County, New York
- Franklinton, North Carolina
- Franklinton, Columbus, Ohio, a historic neighborhood

== Other ==
- Franklinton Vlaie, a stream in the U.S. state of New York

== See also ==
- Franklintown (disambiguation)
