= Tenmile Creek (Catskill Creek tributary) =

Location
- Country: United States
- State: New York
- County: Albany
- Towns: Rensselaerville
- Villages: Medusa

Physical characteristics
- Source: Myosotis Lake
  - location: Myosotis Lake, Village of Rensselaerville
  - coordinates: 42°31′07.78″N 74°08′42.76″W
- Mouth: Catskill Creek
  - location: Oak Hill, New York
  - coordinates: 42°24′13.34″N 74°08′06.88″W
  - elevation: 0 ft (0 m)

Tenmile Creek is a 15.0-mile-long (24.1 km) tributary of Catskill Creek in Albany County, New York. Via Catskill Creek, it is part of the Hudson River watershed.

Tenmile Creek runs through the villages of Rensselaerville and Medusa in the town of Rensselaerville. It approaches the village through a deep ravine, falling 200 feet (61 m) in the course of 0.6 miles (1.0 km), which afforded great hydraulic power to early settlers. The mill house in Medusa stood until the 1980s, when it was destroyed by fire.

== Tributaries ==
- Eightmile Creek

== See also ==
- List of rivers of New York
