= Fox Creek (Catskill Creek tributary) =

Location
- Country: United States
- State: New York
- County: Albany, Greene
- Towns: Rensselaerville

Physical characteristics
- Source: Rensselaerville State Forest
  - location: Rensselaerville State Forest, Village of Rensselaerville
  - coordinates: 42°30′05″N 74°11′04″W
- Mouth: Catskill Creek
  - location: Preston Hollow, New York
  - coordinates: 42°26′27″N 74°12′14″W
  - elevation: 0 ft (0 m)

Fox Creek is a 6.0-mile-long (9.7 km) tributary of Catskill Creek in Albany County, New York. Via Catskill Creek, it is part of the Hudson River watershed. Fox Creek runs from the Rensselaerville State Forest in the town of Rensselaerville to Catskill Creek at Preston Hollow.

== See also ==
- List of rivers of New York
