= Eightmile Creek (Tenmile Creek tributary) =

Location
- Country: United States
- State: New York
- County: Albany
- Towns: Rensselaerville
- Villages: Medusa

Physical characteristics
- Source
  - location: Westerlo, New York
  - coordinates: 42°32′27″N 74°05′33″W
- Mouth: Tenmile Creek
  - location: Medusa, New York, Rensselaerville, New York
  - coordinates: 42°25′53″N 74°07′52″W
  - elevation: 0 ft (0 m)

Eightmile Creek is an 11.8-mile-long (19.0 km) tributary of Tenmile Creek in Albany County, New York. Via Tenmile Creek and Catskill Creek, it is part of the Hudson River watershed. Eightmile Creek runs through the town of Westerlo into the town of Rensselaerville, where it joins Tenmile Creek at the hamlet of Medusa. The creek's source is near Onderdonk Lake by Snyders Corners in Westerlo.

== See also ==
- List of rivers of New York
