= South Mountain (Ashland, New York) =

Mountain in New York, United States

- Location within New York Adirondack Park Location within the United States

Highest point
- Elevation: 2,887 feet (880 m)
- Coordinates: 42°21′43″N 74°17′07″W, 42.3803593°N 74.2640311°W

Geography
- Location: SW of West Durham, New York, U.S.
- Topo map(s): USGS Ashland, Livingstonville

South Mountain is a mountain in Greene County, New York and partially in Schoharie County, New York. It is located in the Catskill Mountains southwest of West Durham. Ashland Pinnacle is located west-southwest, and Steenburg Mountain is located north of South Mountain.

The 1,498-acre South Mountain State Forest is a popular destination in the area that offers hiking, camping, hunting and skiing.
