= High Knob (disambiguation) =

High Knob is a mountain peak in Virginia.

High Knob may also refer to:

- High Knob (New York), a mountain in Schoharie County
- High Knob (Blue Ridge, Virginia), a peak of the Blue Ridge Mountains
- High Knob (West Virginia), a mountain summit
- High Knob, Kentucky, a community; see List of Kentucky supplemental roads and rural secondary highways (500–599)#Kentucky Route 577
