= Oak Hill Cemetery (Oak Hill, New York) =

Historic cemetery in New York, United States

- U.S. National Register of Historic Places
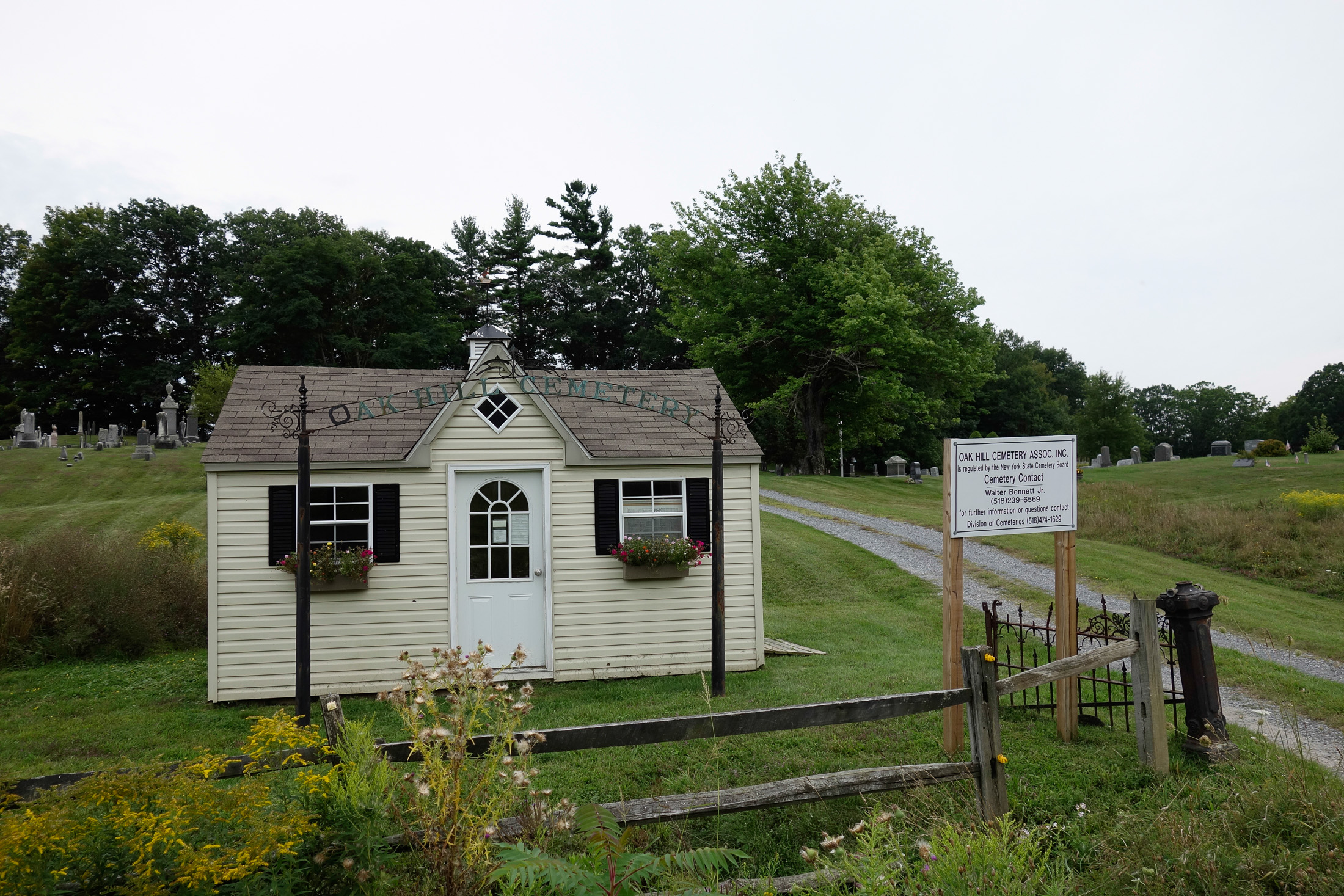
- Oak Hill Cemetery

- Location within New York Location within the United States
- Location: Route 81, Durham, NY
- Nearest city: Oak Hill, New York
- Coordinates: 42°24′43″N 74°9′38″W
- Area: 5.6 acres (2.3 ha)
- NRHP reference No.: 11000274
- Added to NRHP: 2011-05-11

Oak Hill Cemetery is located on Route 81 in Durham, Greene County, New York. This 5.6-acre cemetery originated as the burial place of early settlers Lucas and Deborah DeWitt on their family farm in the early 1820s, and evolved into a community cemetery for local residents.

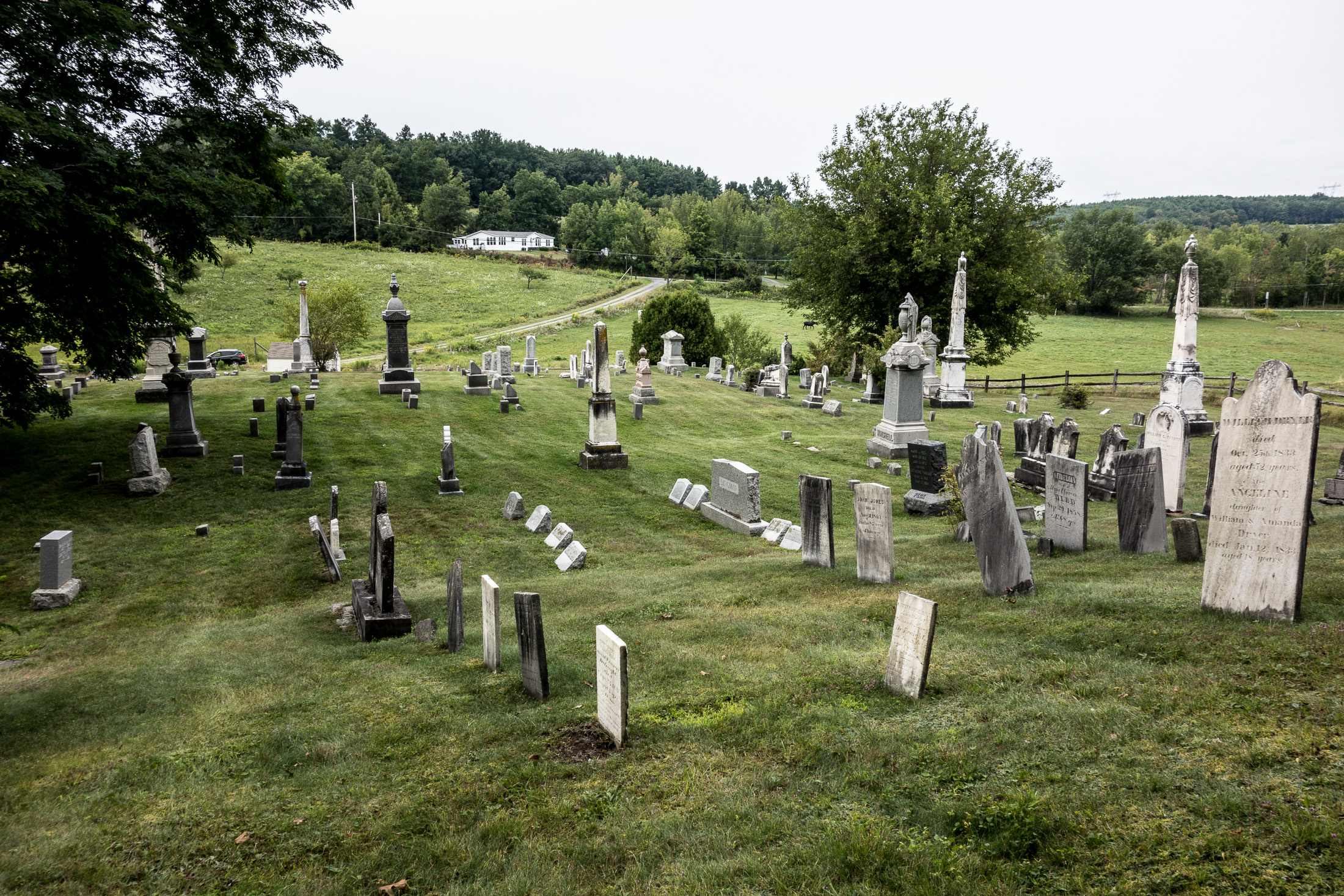
Oak Hill Cemetery

This cemetery is on the National Register of Historic Places.

== See also ==
- National Register of Historic Places listings in Greene County, New York
