= High Knob (New York) =

Mountain in New York, United States

- Location within New York Adirondack Park Location within the United States

Highest point
- Elevation: 2,664 feet (812 m)
- Coordinates: 42°25′42″N 74°18′46″W

Geography
- Location: SW of Livingstonville, New York, U.S.
- Topo map: USGS Livingstonville

High Knob is a mountain in Schoharie County, New York. It is located southwest of Livingstonville. Steenburg Mountain is located southeast and Scott Patent Hill is located east-northeast of High Knob.
