= Franklintown =

Franklintown may refer to some places in the United States:

- Franklintown, Florida
- Franklintown, Pennsylvania, a borough
- Franklintown, Philadelphia, a neighborhood
- Franklintown, West Virginia

== See also ==
- Franklinton (disambiguation)
