= Scott Patent Hill =

Mountain in New York, United States

- Location within New York Adirondack Park Location within the United States

Highest point
- Elevation: 2,064 feet (629 m)
- Coordinates: 42°27′16″N 74°15′09″W, 42°27′01″N 74°14′48″W

Geography
- Location: SSE of Livingstonville, New York, U.S.
- Topo map(s): USGS Livingstonville, Durham

Scott Patent Hill is a mountain in Schoharie County, New York and partially in Albany County, New York. It is located south-southeast of Livingstonville. Steenburg Mountain is located south-southwest and Dutton Ridge is located north-northwest of Scott Patent Hill.
