= Ford's Store =

Historic commercial building in New York, United States

- U.S. National Register of Historic Places
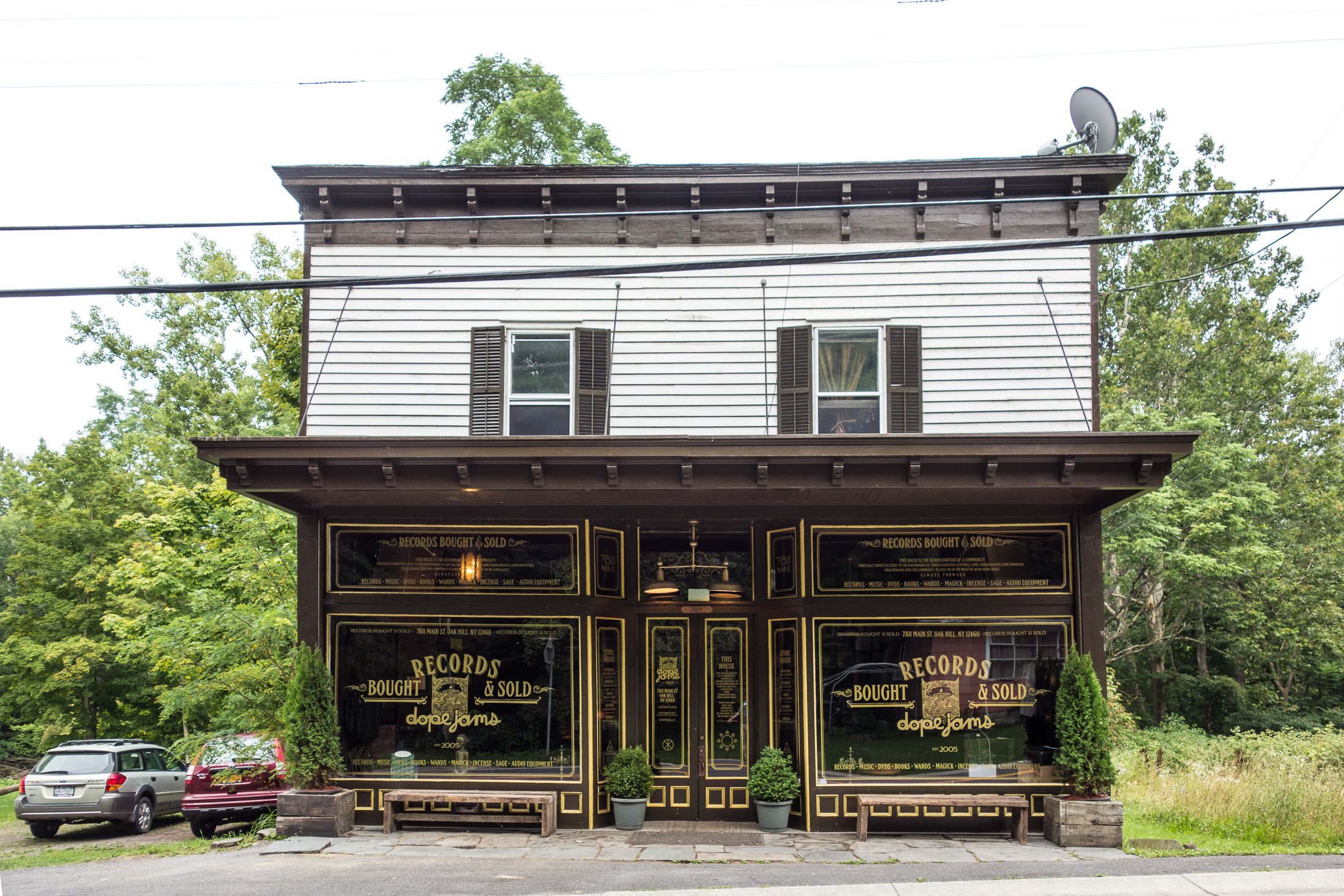
- Ford's Store in 2013 was home to a record shop

- Location within New York Location within the United States
- Location: 7811 NY 81, Durham, New York
- Coordinates: 42°24′35″N 74°9′11″W
- Area: less than one acre
- Built: 1870
- Architectural style: Italianate
- NRHP reference No.: 01001395
- Added to NRHP: December 28, 2001

Ford's Store is a historic general store located in the hamlet of Oak Hill in the town of Durham in Greene County, New York.

== History and description ==
It was built in 1870 as a two-story commercial building in the Italianate style, and was listed on the National Register of Historic Places in 2001. The restored storefront is composed of a recessed entry flanked by display windows. John Bonafide, preservation analyst from the New York State Parks Commission, said of the building, “As constructed, Ford’s Store is a representative example of Italianate style commercial architecture, popular in America during the third quarter of the nineteenth century. Built on the site of an earlier store and harness shop, the building is architecturally significant as an intact example of simple, mid-nineteenth century commercial architecture in the hamlet of Oak Hill. Today, the Ford’s Store building is one of two intact commercial storefronts to survive in the community. Despite years of neglect and damage, Ford’s store, as restored, survives with a high degree of its architectural integrity.”

Emerson Ford was the first of the Ford family to handle general merchandise there in partnership with G. M. Hallenbeck in 1875 as Ford and Hallenbeck. Emerson Ford had two sons, Ernest E. and N. Dwight. Ernest E. came into the business in 1898 with the help of his wife, Bertie Conran. Emerson's other son, N. Dwight, married Millie B. Mackey and moved to Nebraska, where they had a son named Theodore Leo. Leo helped at the store during the summers of 1925 to 1926 before coming to work there full time in 1928. He became a partner of Ernest in 1931, and the store was then known as Ford and Ford. The last of the Fords to enter the business were George and Lionel, sons of Leo, and together with their father and great uncle they worked in the store until illness forced Ernest into retirement in the late 1950s.

At that time Ralph Brand took over the store. A newspaper article recounts: “Ralph Brand has purchased stock, fixtures and merchandise of Fords’ store and will rent the building. Oak Hill post office will continue to occupy a portion of the store and will be operated by Leo and George Ford and Gledon Hulbert. Ralph will operate the store with Mrs. George Ford as his assistant.” Kenneth Brand, Ralph’s son, remembers: “My father ran the Ford store in the late 1950’s. I used to play around the store when I was a kid. Behind the store there used to be a shed. The shed had an outhouse in it, and the outhouse extended out over the Catskill creek. No flushing was required. Not very environmentally friendly, but that’s the way things were done back then. John Cords ran it for a few years after my father gave it up. I would guess that it closed around 1966 or 1967.” Sometime after that, the front windows were removed to install garage doors to allow the space to be used for auto repairs and storage.

The building was restored in the 1990s, when the original components of the façade were found intact in the basement of the building and reinstalled. For a time, George Stevens ran a business called The Electric Farm out of the building, selling plants, especially African violets, that were grown under lights. Later the building was used as an annex of DeWitt Hotel Antiques, and then as a bookstore run by Fari Raad of Cornwallville. A record store, Dope Jams, which operated in Brooklyn from 2006 to 2012, was next to occupy the space. Dope Jams had been called “one of the best record stores on the East Coast.” The store, owned by Paul Nickerson, was decorated “like Aleister Crowley’s library” and carried house, dance, disco music, classic hip-hop, and techno. In 2020 the building was painted a solid charcoal gray when poet Kostas Anagnopoulos took over the space as Pidgin, selling antique furniture and objects with select contemporary items. Kostas said of the store, "A pidgin is a simplified form of communication; an informal language, often developed in trade, allowing those from different backgrounds to convey thoughts to one another. I like to think of the objects in my store, with their quiet presence and shared appeal, as both the medium and the message."

Ford's Store
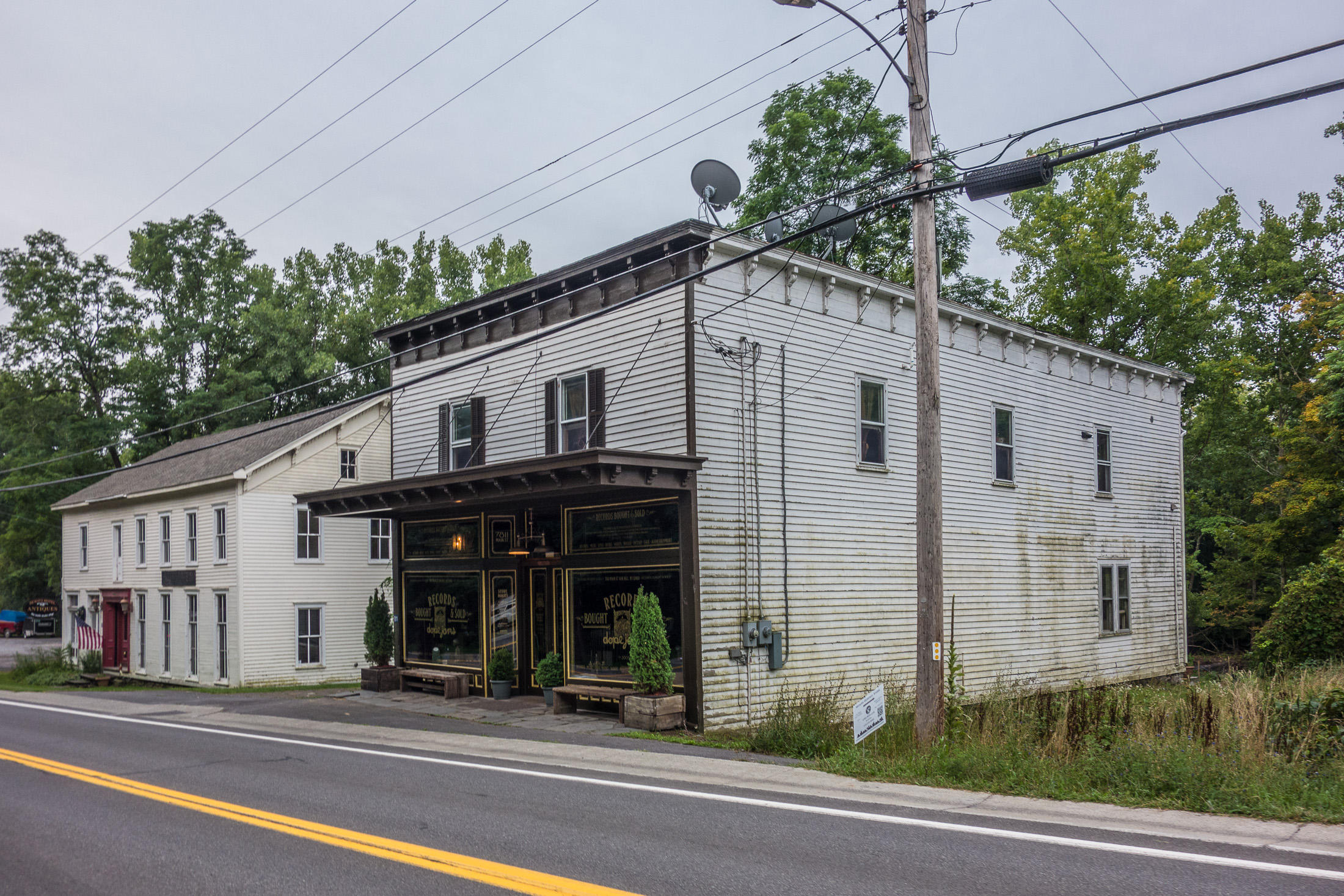
DeWitt Hotel (left) and Ford's Store, 2013.

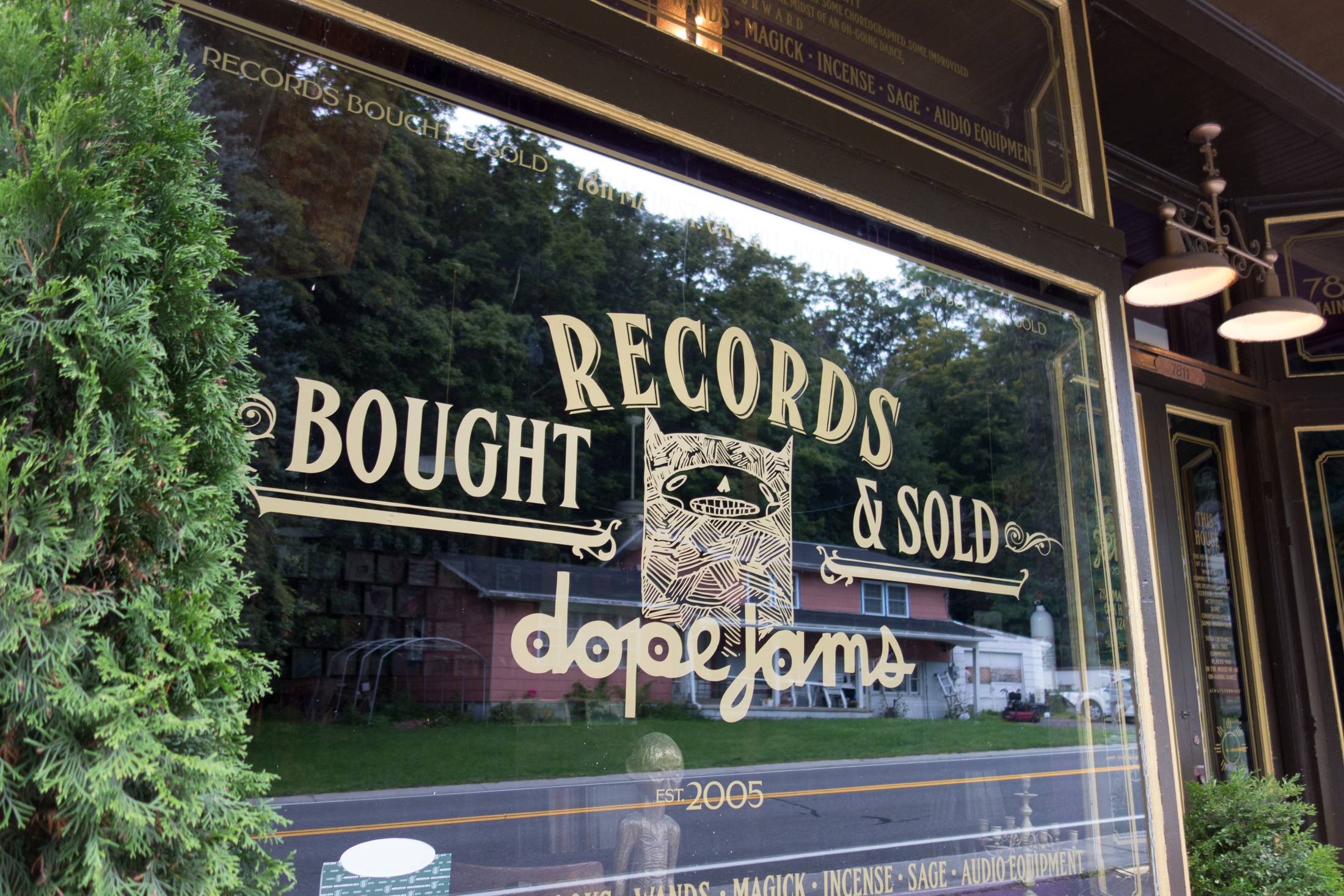
Detail of window of Ford's Store, now Dope Jams Record Store

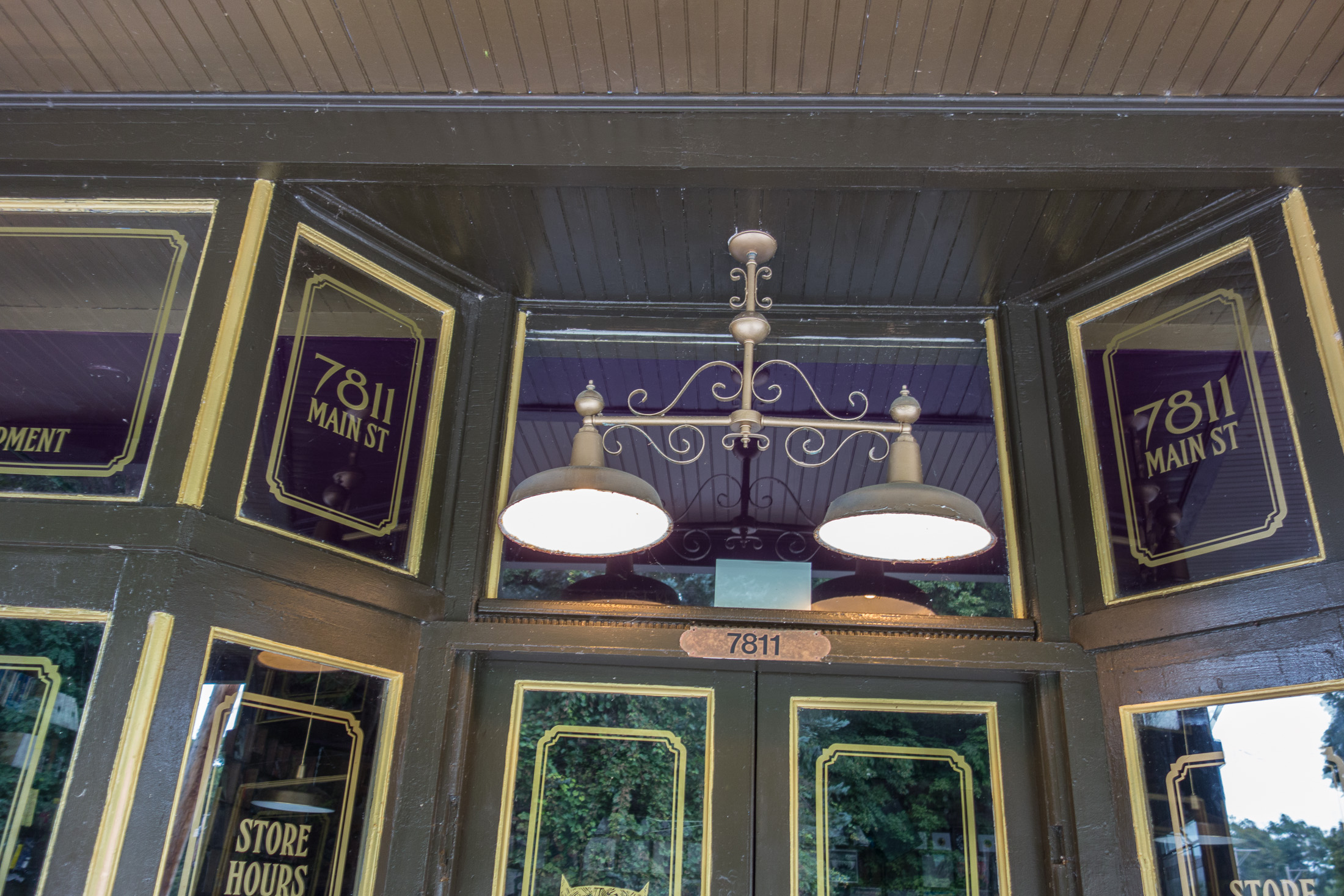
Another detail of the windows at Ford's Store

== See also ==
- National Register of Historic Places listings in Greene County, New York
