= Sidney White House =

Historic house in New York, United States

- U.S. National Register of Historic Places
- Location within New York Location within the United States
- Nearest city: Preston Hollow, New York
- Coordinates: 42°28′9″N 74°11′59″W
- Area: 23.4 acres (9.5 ha)
- Built: 1841
- Architectural style: Greek Revival
- NRHP reference No.: 05001394
- Added to NRHP: December 7, 2005

Sidney White House is a historic home located at Preston Hollow in Albany County, New York. It was built about 1841 and consists of a main block with addition. The main block is a five bay, two story gable ended building with a medium pitched roof. The addition, originally a wood shed, is one and one half stories in height with a medium pitched roof. It is of heavy timber-frame construction on a rubblestone foundation. Interior treatments are Greek Revival in style.

It was listed on the National Register of Historic Places in 2005.
