= Dutton Ridge =

Mountain in Schoharie County, New York

- Location within New York Adirondack Park Location within the United States

Highest point
- Elevation: 1,975 feet (602 m)
- Coordinates: 42°30′39″N 74°15′54″W

Geography
- Location: SE of Middleburgh, New York, U.S.
- Topo map: USGS Middleburgh

Dutton Ridge is a mountain in Schoharie County, New York. It is located southeast of Middleburgh. East Hill is located north-northwest and Scott Patent Hill is located south of Dutton Ridge.
