= Tripp House and Store Complex =

Historic house in New York, United States

- U.S. National Register of Historic Places
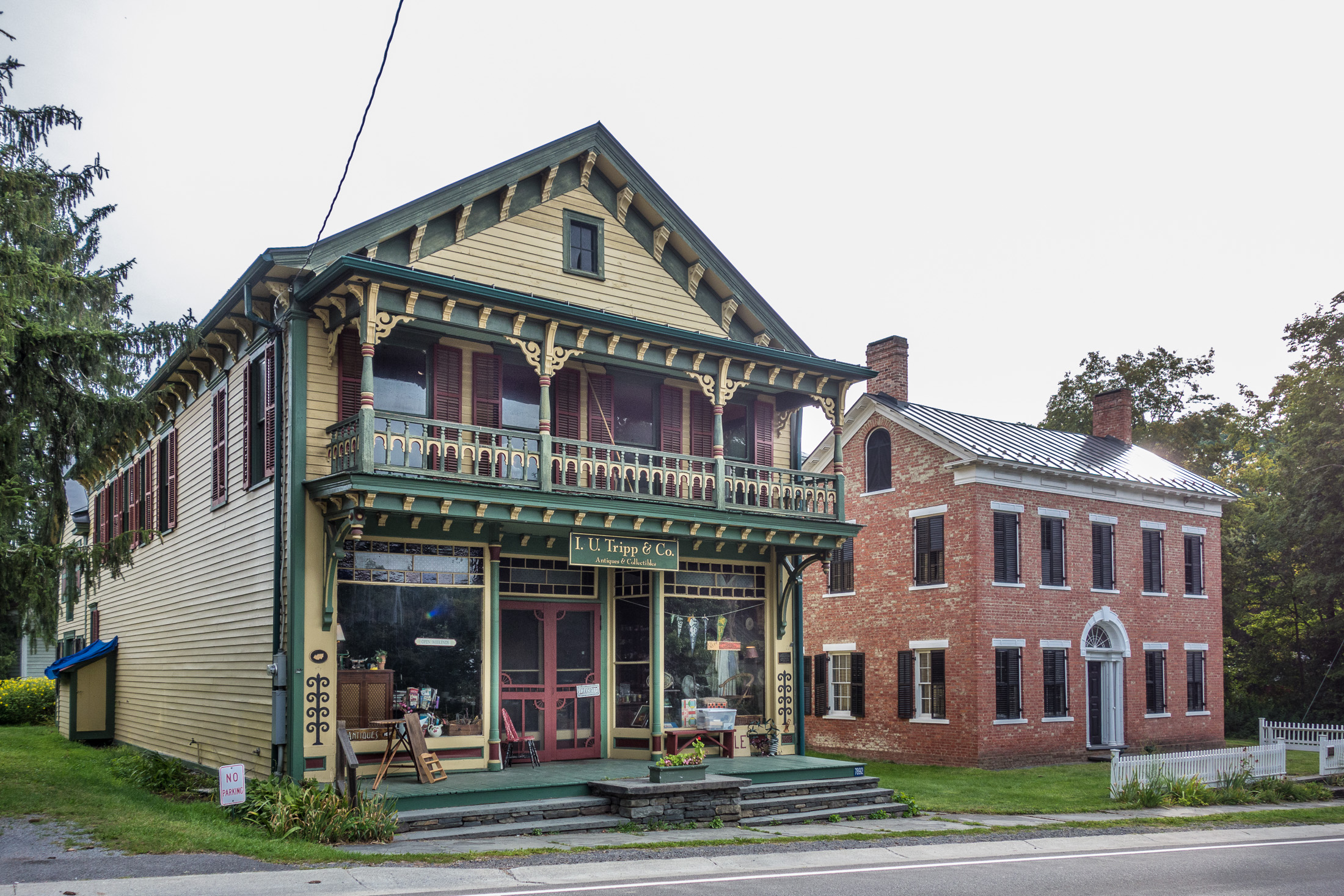
- Tripp store (left) and house (right) in 2013

- Location within New York Location within the United States
- Location: NY 81, Durham, New York
- Coordinates: 42°24′44″N 74°9′20″W
- Area: less than one acre
- Built: 1830
- Architectural style: Federal, Queen Anne
- NRHP reference No.: 01000240
- Added to NRHP: March 12, 2001

Tripp House and Store Complex is a historic home and general store complex located at Durham in Greene County, New York. The complex includes the Tripp House (c. 1830), the Original Tripp Store (c. 1830) and 1888 Tripp Store, a barn (c. 1830), Outhouse (c. 1870), and two outbuildings / sheds (c. 1890). The house is a 2-story, five by two-bay, central hall, single pile plan brick dwelling. It sits on a stone foundation and is surmounted by a steep gable roof. The 1888 Tripp Store is a four- by eight-bay, 2 1/2-story wood frame commercial / residential structure. It features a 2-story Victorian-era porch. It incorporates the Original Tripp Store, a 2-story timber-frame building, as a rear storage section.

It was listed on the National Register of Historic Places in 2001.

== Gallery ==
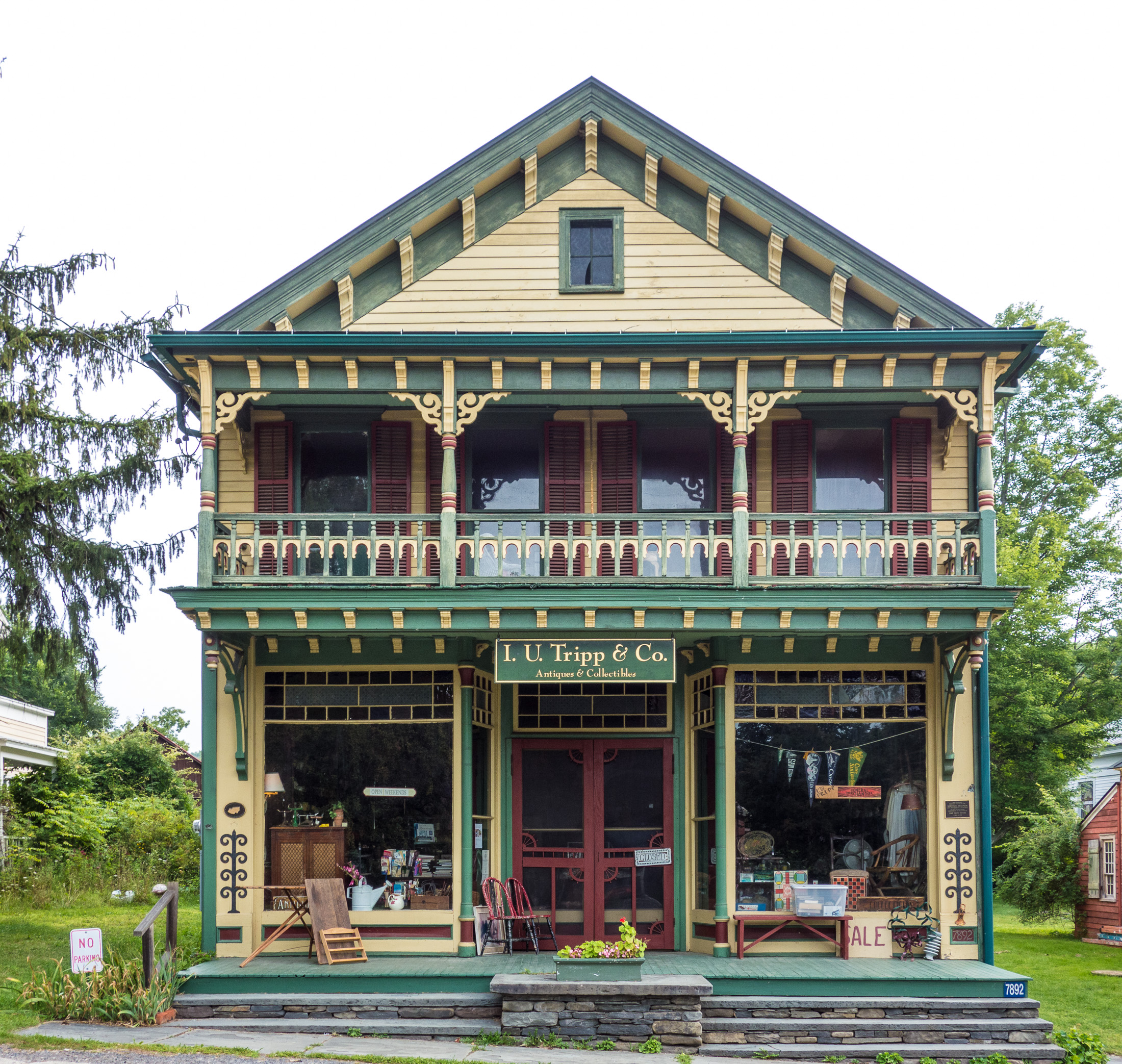
Tripp Store

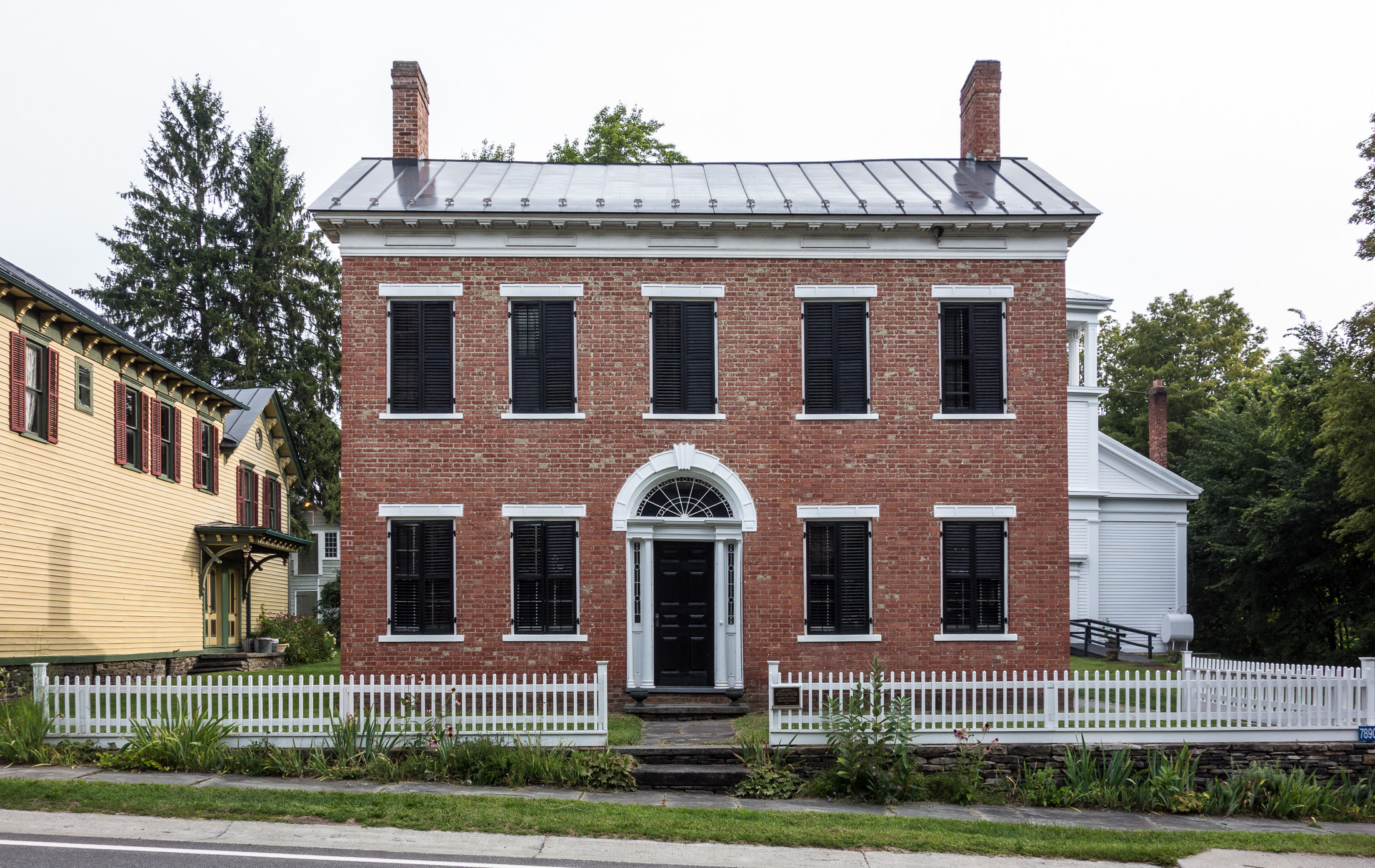
Adjacent Tripp House

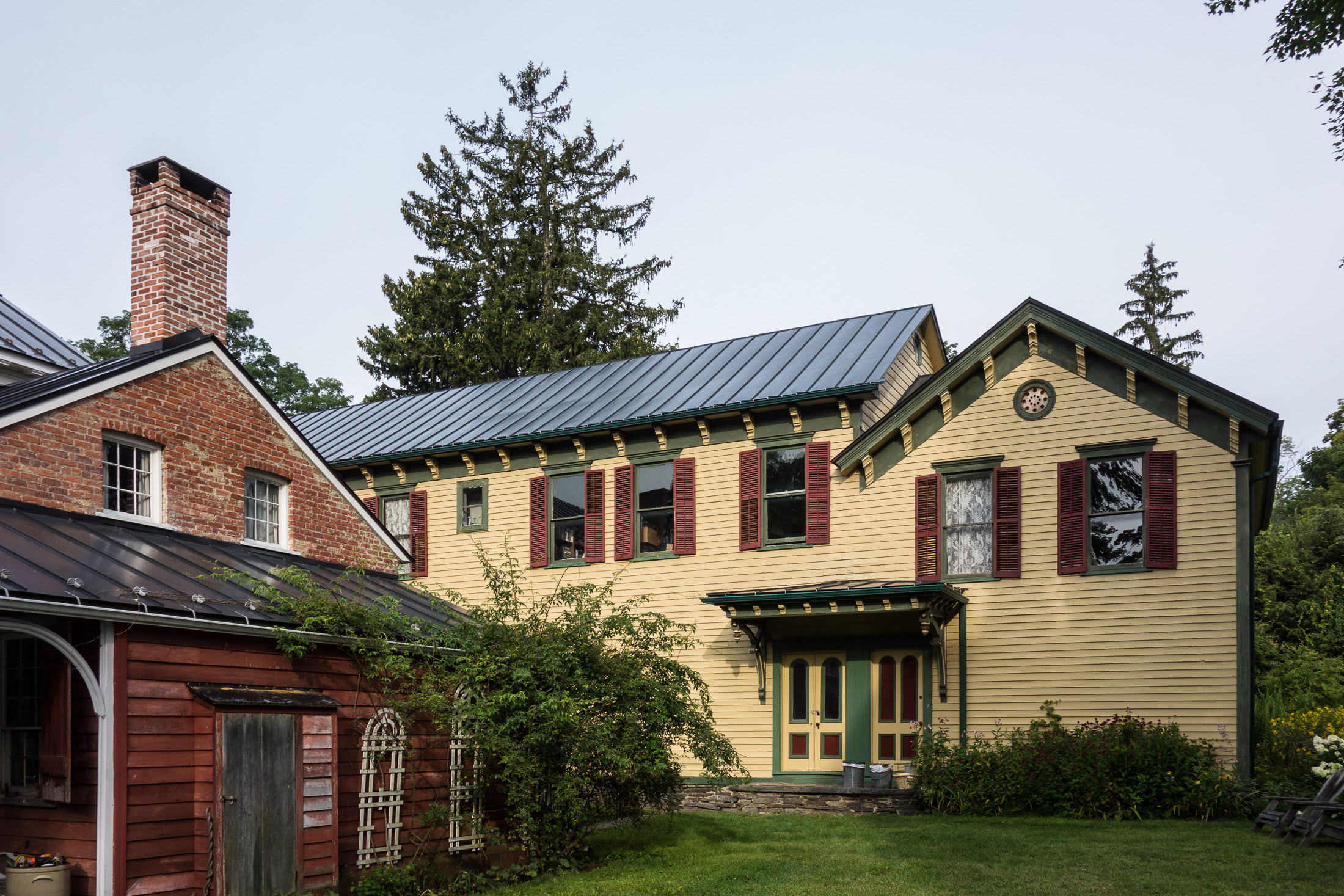
Original Tripp Store is used as a rear storage area
