= W. F. DeWitt Hotel =

- U.S. National Register of Historic Places
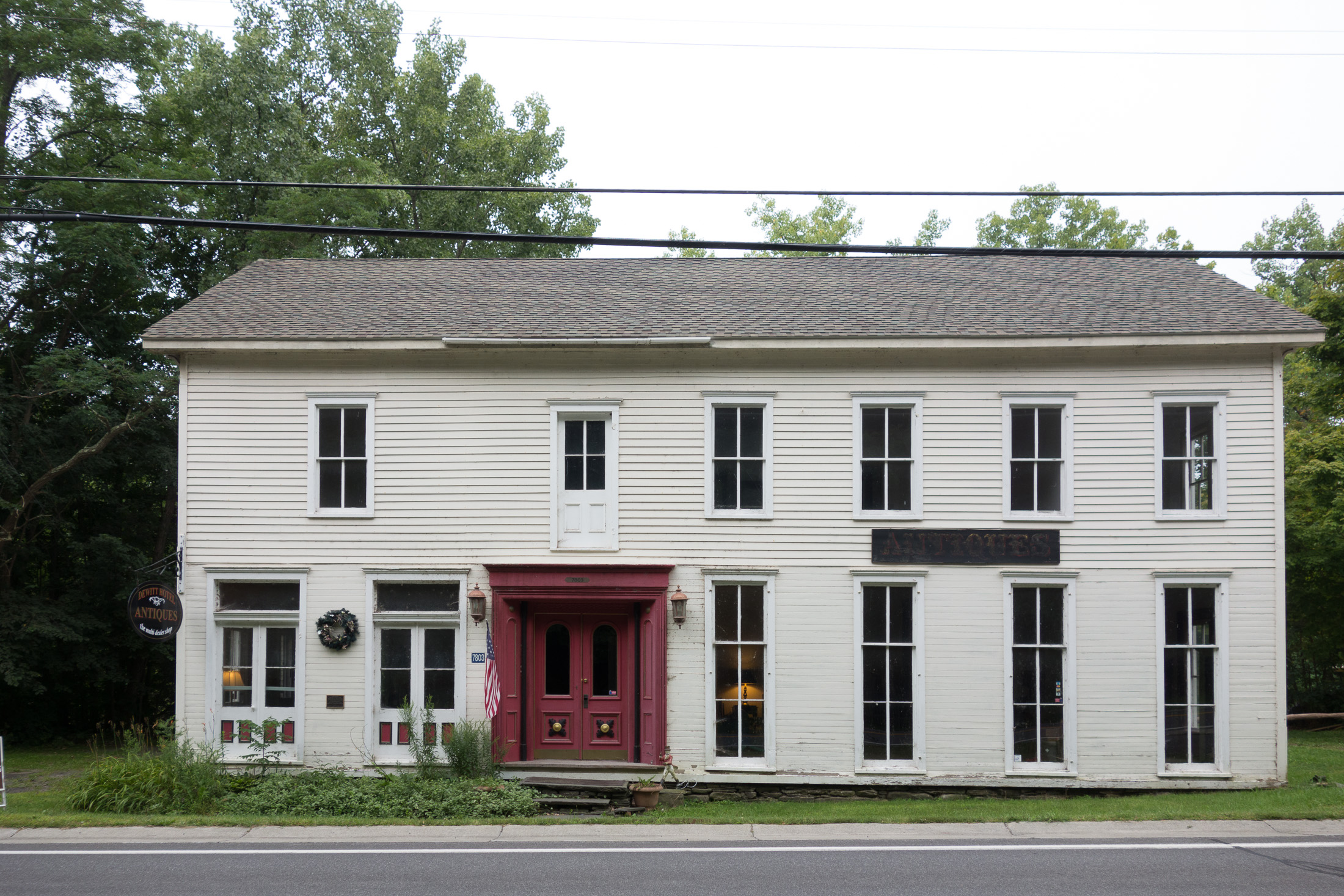
- W. F. DeWitt Hotel in 2013

- Location within New York Location within the United States
- Location: 7803 NY 81, Durham, New York
- Coordinates: 42°24′35″N 74°9′11″W
- Area: less than one acre
- Built: 1865
- Architectural style: Italianate
- NRHP reference No.: 01001389
- Added to NRHP: December 28, 2001

W. F. DeWitt Hotel is a historic hotel located at Durham in Greene County, New York. It was built about 1865, and is a 2 1/2-story, seven bay by three bay, frame building in the Italianate style. It rests on a stone foundation and has a moderately pitched gable roof. As of 2013, it was operating as an antiques store.

It was listed on the National Register of Historic Places in 2001.

W.F. DeWitt Hotel, Durham, NY
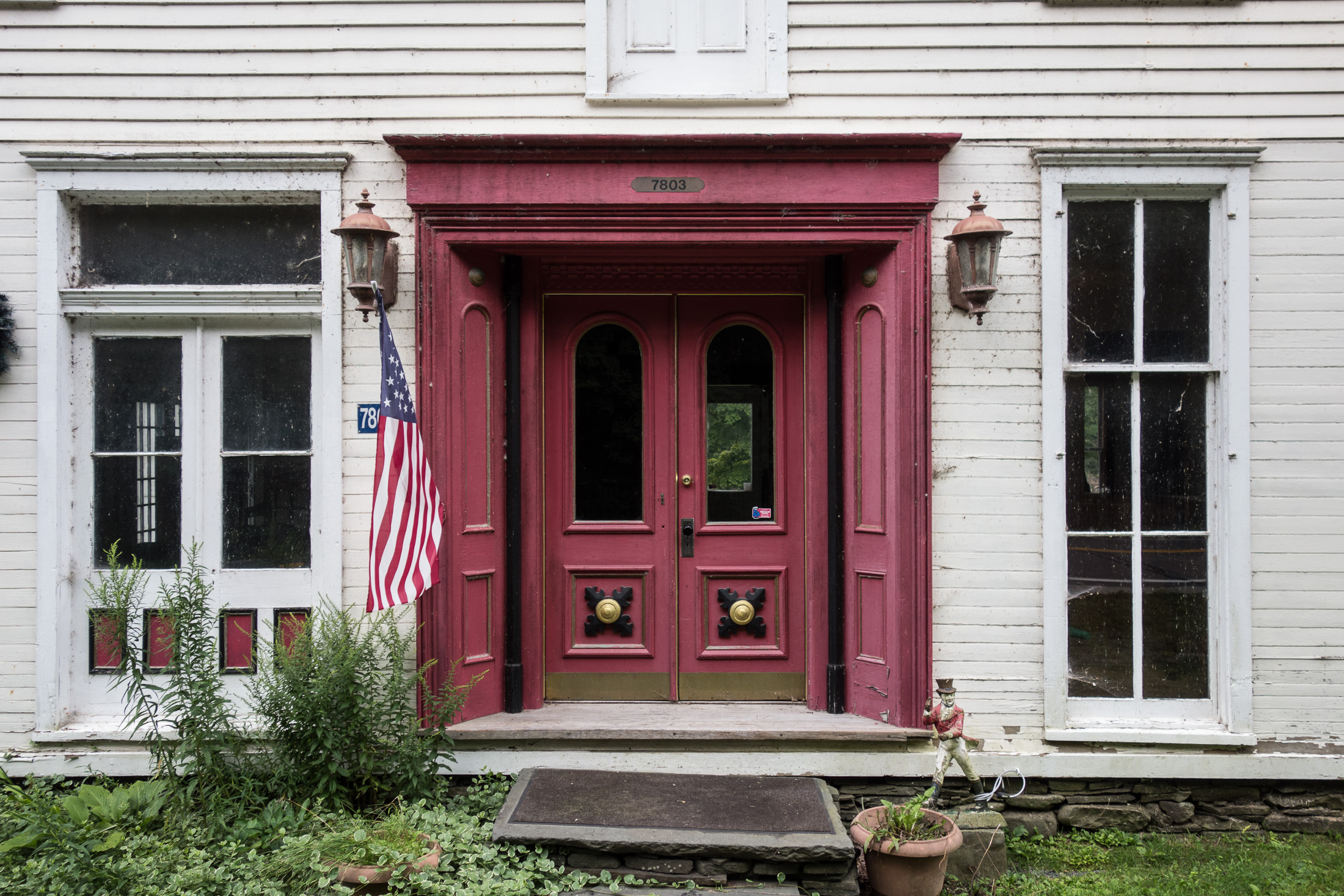
Closeup of the doorway

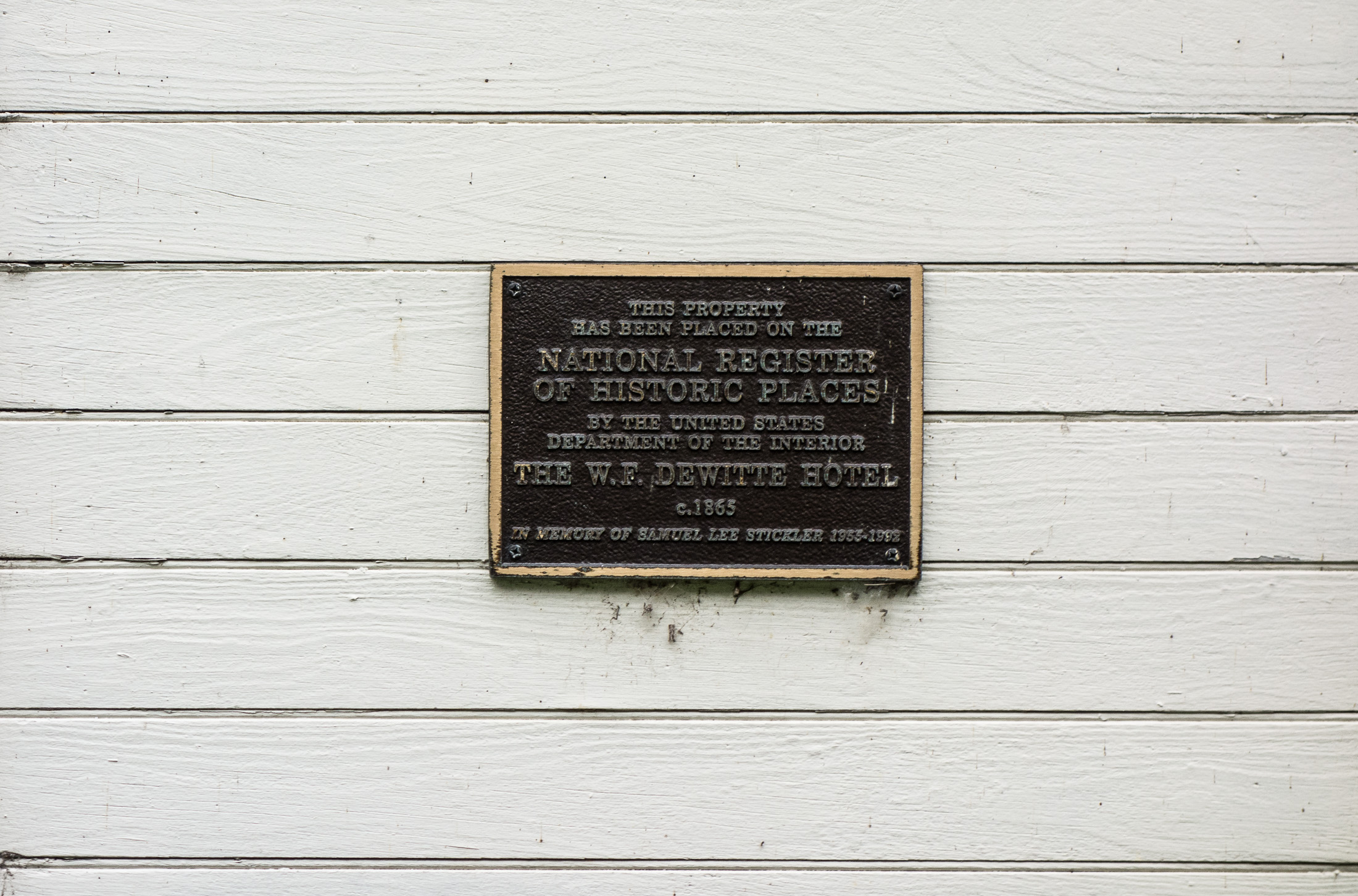
NRHP plaque

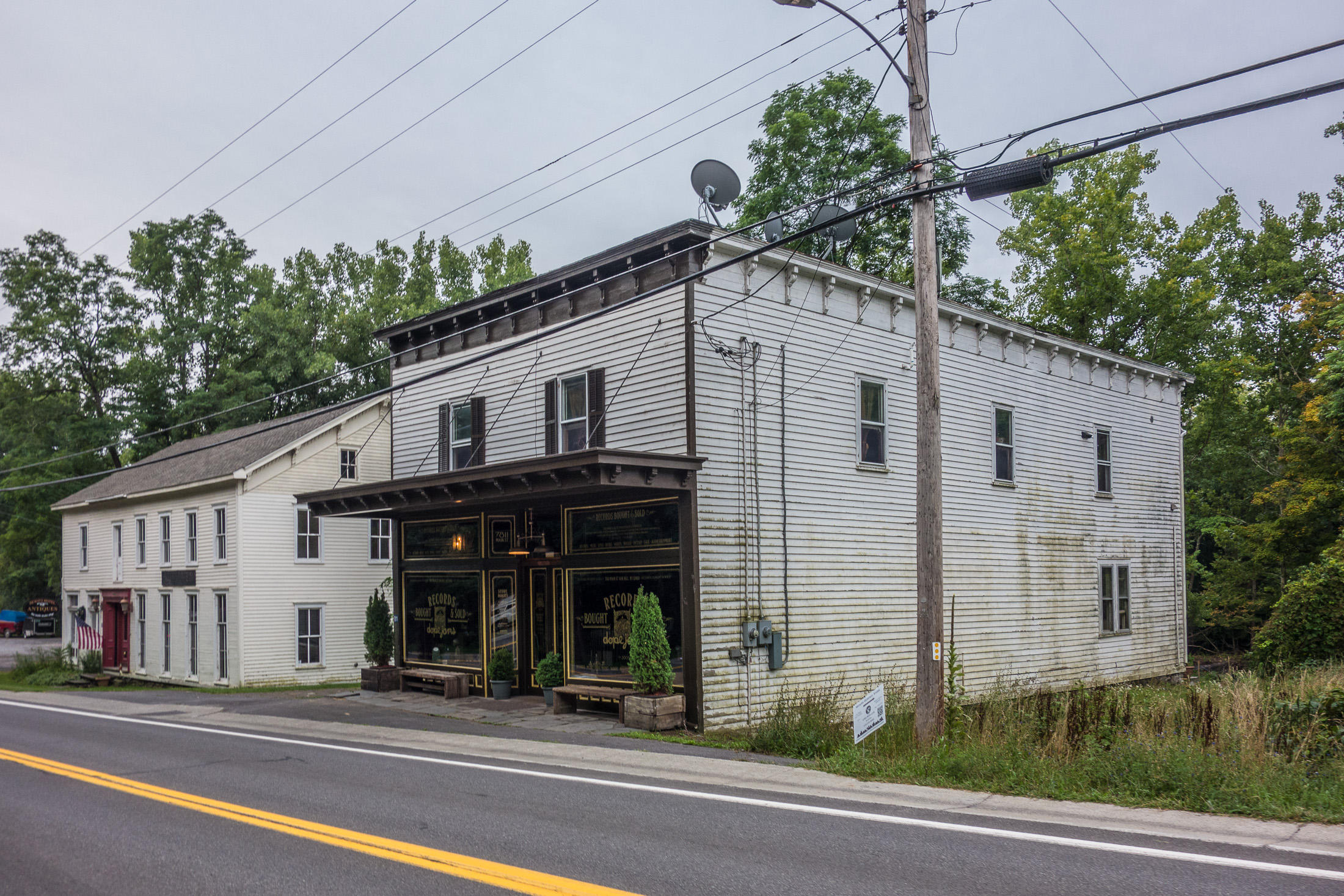
DeWitt Hotel is next to Ford's Store

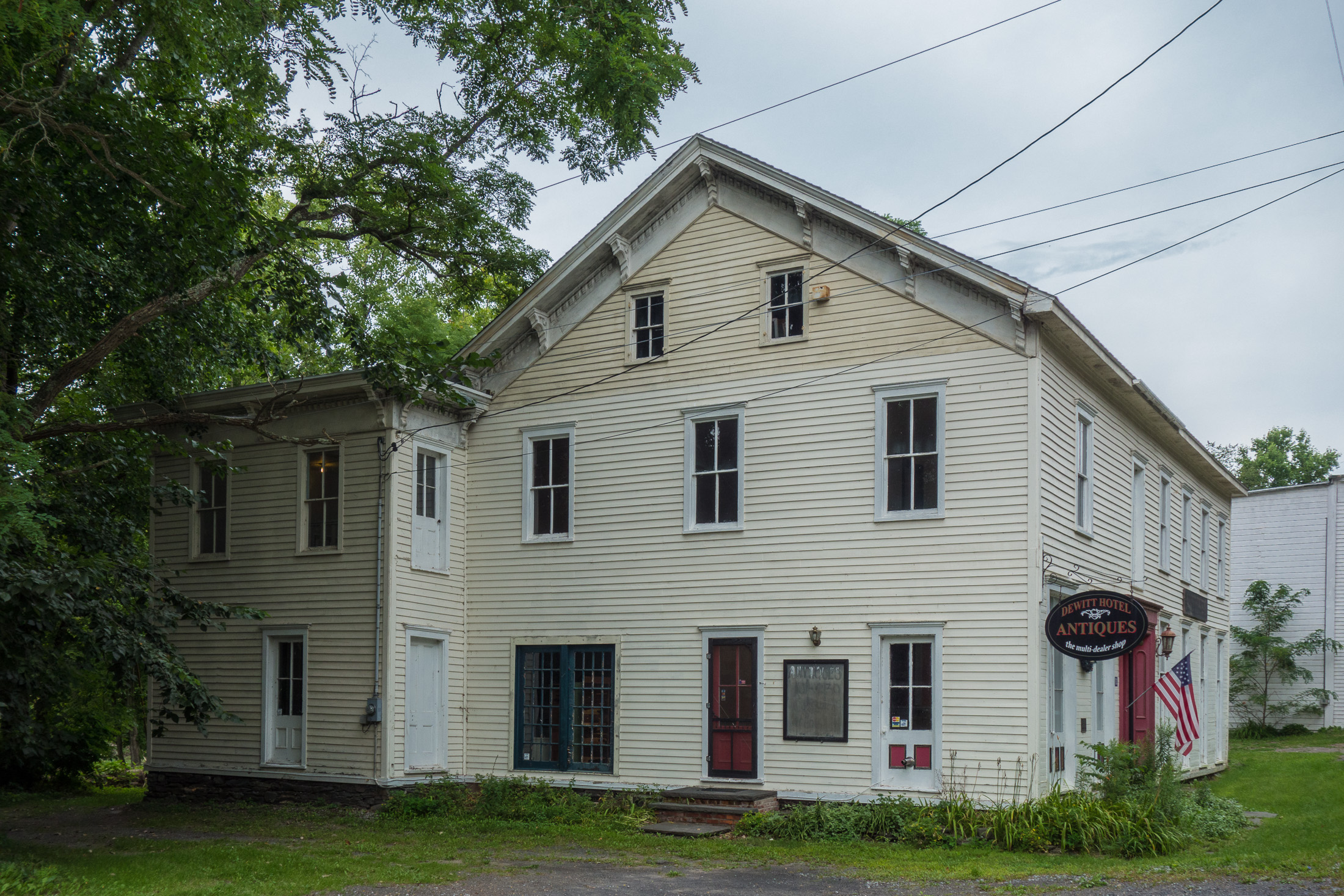
Side view

== See also ==
- National Register of Historic Places listings in Greene County, New York
