= Livingstonville Community Church =

Historic church in New York, United States

- U.S. National Register of Historic Places
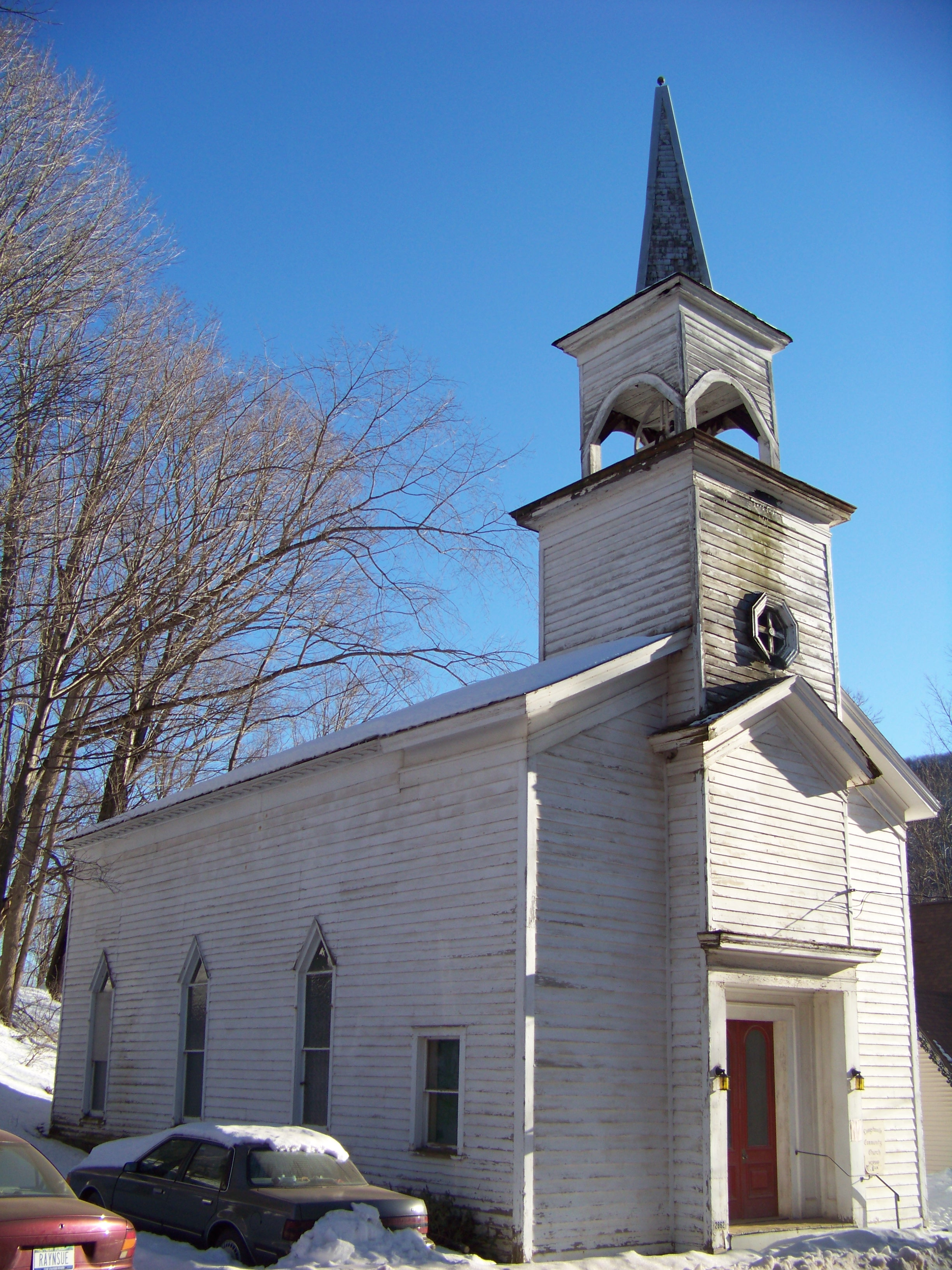

- Location within New York Location within the United States
- Location: 1667 Hauverville Rd., Livingstonville, New York
- Coordinates: 42°29′24″N 74°16′6″W
- Area: less than one acre
- Built: 1849
- Architectural style: Greek Revival
- NRHP reference No.: 07001370
- Added to NRHP: January 9, 2008

Livingstonville Community Church is a historic church at 1667 Hauverville Road in Livingstonville, Schoharie County, New York. It is a rectangular, gable roofed, vernacular Greek Revival building built in 1849. It features an engaged, clapboard sheathed bell tower surmounted by an open belfry.

It was listed on the National Register of Historic Places in 2008.
