= Molly O'Neill =

American food writer and journalist (1952–2019)

- Born: October 9, 1952; Columbus, Ohio, United States
- Died: June 16, 2019 (aged 66); Manhattan, New York City, New York, United States
- Education: École de Cuisine La Varenne; Denison University
- Occupations: Journalist; food writer; cookbook author
- Spouse(s): Stanley Dry (divorced); Arthur Samuelson (divorced)
- Writing career
- Notable awards: James Beard awards; Nominee for Pulitzer Prize (twice)

Molly O'Neill (October 9, 1952 - June 16, 2019) was an American food writer, cookbook author, and journalist, perhaps best known for her food column in The New York Times Sunday Magazine and Style section throughout the 1990s.

O'Neill was born and grew up in Columbus, Ohio, the only girl in a family with five brothers born to Charles and Virginia O'Neill. In her 2006 memoir, Molly O'Neill describes the family's strong interest in baseball. Her father had been a minor league pitcher before working for North American Aviation and later running an excavation business. Her younger brother Paul O'Neill became an outfielder for the Cincinnati Reds and the New York Yankees.

Molly's early exposure to cooking came from making dinner for her brothers, at times surreptitiously to circumvent "healthier" dinners left for the children by their mother.

O'Neill earned a bachelor's degree from Denison University in Granville, Ohio. She then moved to Northampton, Massachusetts where she and eight other women opened a feminist cooperative restaurant. She studied cooking formally for eight weeks at l'École de Cuisine La Varenne, one of the first cooking schools in Paris to offer instruction in both English and French. After moving to Ciro & Sal's, an Italian restaurant in Boston, O'Neill was recognized by Boston magazine as best female chef in 1982.

O'Neill wrote articles on food for The Boston Globe and Boston magazine. She was hired by Donald Forst in 1985 to write for New York Newsday. In 1990, she moved to the New York Times, where she wrote a food column for their Sunday Magazine and Style section for a decade. During that time, she published a number of influential articles, including a widely read piece noting that salsa had displaced ketchup as the most popular condiment in the United States, and exploring the cultural implications of that fact.

For many years, O'Neill lived in Rensselaerville, New York, where she hosted students for summer writing workshops as part of a program she founded called CookNScribble. She moved back to New York City as her health declined.

In July 2016, O'Neill experienced liver failure. In October 2016, she received a liver transplant, but it was later discovered that her original liver had had cancerous cells that had metastasized to her adrenal glands. Her friend, writer Anne Lamott, organized a fundraiser to help cover her medical costs. O'Neill died of complications of metastatic cancer in June 2019.

== Selected bibliography ==
- The New York Cookbook (1992)
- "New Mainstream: Hot Dogs, Apple Pie and Salsa" The New York Times (11 Mar 1992)
- A Well-Seasoned Appetite: Recipes From an American Kitchen (1995)
- The Pleasure of Your Company: How to Give a Dinner Party Without Losing Your Mind (1997)
- "Food Porn." Columbia Journalism Review. (01 Sep 2003)
- Mostly True: A Memoir of Family, Food, and Baseball (2006) New York, NY: Scribner. ISBN 0743232682
- One Big Table: A Portrait of American Cooking (2010)
- American Food Writing: An Anthology with Classic Recipes Molly O'Neill, ed. (2007) New York, NY: Library of America ISBN 1-59853-005-4

== See also ==
- List of American print journalists
- List of people from New York City
