= Bull Hill (Schoharie County, New York) =

Mountain in Schoharie County, New York

- Location within New York Adirondack Park Location within the United States

Highest point
- Elevation: 1,942 feet (592 m)
- Coordinates: 42°23′55″N 74°24′14″W

Geography
- Location: E of Gilboa, New York, U.S.
- Topo map: USGS Gilboa

Bull Hill is a mountain in Schoharie County, New York. It is located east of Gilboa. Reed Hill is located northwest and Stevens Mountain is located southwest of Bull Hill.
