= Steenburg Mountain =

Mountain in New York, United States

- Location within New York Location within the United States

Highest point
- Elevation: 2,566 feet (782 m)
- Coordinates: 42°23′40″N 74°16′30″W

Geography
- Location: Windham, New York, U.S.
- Topo map: USGS Livingstonville

Steenburg Mountain is a mountain located in the Catskill Mountains of New York, north-northwest of Windham. High Knob is located to its northwest, Sicklers Mountain is to its west-southwest, South Mountain is to its south, and Mount Pisgah is to its southeast.
