= Basic Creek =

Stream in New York

Coordinates: 42°21′13″N 74°03′15″W

Basic Creek is a stream in the U.S. state of New York.

The name "Basic" is possibly derived from the Mahican language, meaning "stone".

== See also ==
- Basic Creek Reservoir
