= Rensselaerville Historic District =

Historic district in New York, United States

- U.S. National Register of Historic Places
- U.S. Historic district
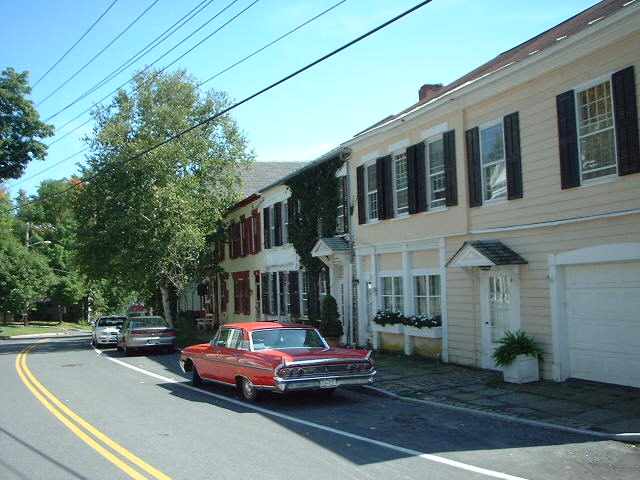
- Row Houses on South Side of Main St., September 2009

- Location within New York Location within the United States
- Location: Old Albany, Pond Hill, Methodist Hill Rds. and Main St., Rensselaerville, New York
- Coordinates: 42°30′59″N 74°8′6″W
- Area: 109 acres (44 ha)
- Built: 1790
- Architect: Multiple
- Architectural style: Greek Revival, Gothic
- NRHP reference No.: 83001635
- Added to NRHP: September 15, 1983

Rensselaerville Historic District is a national historic district located at Rensselaerville in Albany County, New York. It includes 86 contributing buildings and encompasses most of the buildings in the hamlet of Rensselaerville. Most date to the early 19th century and are predominantly Greek Revival in style.

It was listed on the National Register of Historic Places in 1983.
