= Grey Fox Bluegrass Festival =

Music festival in Oak Hill, New York

David Grisman, Chris Thile and Enrique Coria at the Grey Fox Bluegrass Festival in 1998

Grey Fox Bluegrass Festival is an annual music festival held in mid-July in Oak Hill, Greene County, New York. The festival features a variety of acoustic music including traditional and contemporary bluegrass, jam bands, old-time, swing and Cajun. The festival presents nationally and internationally touring bluegrass bands and showcases emerging artists from around the country. Music runs Thursday through Sunday the third weekend of July.camping opens on Wednesday. and attendance averages about 3,000.

In addition to performances on several stages, activities include dancing, camping, children's entertainment, yoga, jamming, hands-on music workshops, traditional dance instruction, professional development seminars for musicians, and a “Bluegrass Academy for Kids” ages 8 to 17.

== History ==
Grey Fox Bluegrass Festival began in 1983 as the Winterhawk Bluegrass Festival on the Rothvoss Farm in Ancramdale, Columbia County, New York on the site of the 1976 Berkshire Mountain Bluegrass Festival. Producer Mary Tyler Doub asked Ron Thamason and his band, the Dry Branch Fire Squad, to host the festival's main stage show.

Doub moved the event to the Walsh Farm in Oak Hill, New York on the banks of Catskill Creek in 2008. That year, Grey Fox was named Bluegrass Event of the Year by the International Bluegrass Music Association.

The 86-minute documentary, Bluegrass Journey (2003), was filmed in part at Grey Fox. In 2005, Grey Fox Bluegrass Festival was one of ten musical events around the world featured in BBC World's television series, Destination Music.

== Program ==
Each year the festival program includes about than 40 acts on five stages" Notable artists have included Sam Bush, Tony Rice, Nickel Creek and Béla Fleck. The 2015 event included Del McCoury, Peter Rowan, Tim O'Brien, Abigail Washburn, Punch Brothers, Bill Keith, Hot Rize, the Infamous Stringdusters, the Gibson Brothers, the Steep Canyon Rangers, Balsam Range and others

In 2015, Grey Fox was the setting of a two-hour Keith Banjo Summit honoring the influential music of Bill Keith. The summit was hosted by Béla Fleck and Tony Trischka, with Noam Pikelny, Mike Munford, Eric Weissberg, Marc Horowitz, Mike Kropp, and Ryan Cavanaugh participating, and Bill Keith in attendance.
