= Oak Hill, New York =

- Hamlet
- Location within New York Location within the United States
- Coordinates: 42°24′35″N 74°09′08″W
- Country: United States
- State: New York
- County: Greene County
- Town: Durham
- Elevation: 643 ft (196 m)
- Time zone: UTC-5 (EST)
  - Summer (DST): UTC-4 (EDT)
- ZIP Code: 12460
- Area code: 518
- GNIS feature ID: 959100

Oak Hill is a hamlet within the town of Durham in Greene County, New York, United States. Its elevation is 643 feet (196 m) above sea level. It has the ZIP Code 12460 and the Telephone Area Code 518.

It is the location of Oak Hill Methodist Episcopal Church, and the Oak Hill Cemetery, which are listed on the U.S. National Register of Historic Places. The Catskill Creek and Tenmile Creek are prominent features in the landscape of the community. Oak Hill is home to one of the Twelve Tribes communities.

The Grey Fox Bluegrass Festival has been held in Oak Hill every July since 2008, with, due to the COVID- 19 pandemic, the exceptions of 2020, and 2021.

== See also ==
- Hamlets in New York
