= Sicklers Mountain =

Mountain in New York, United States

- Location within New York Location within the United States

Highest point
- Elevation: 2,303 feet (702 m)
- Coordinates: 42°22′12″N 74°23′49″W

Geography
- Location: Windham, New York, U.S.
- Topo map: USGS Prattsville

Sicklers Mountain is a mountain located in the Catskill Mountains of New York north-northwest of Windham. Stevens Mountain is located northwest, and Mount Royal is located west of Sicklers Mountain.
