= Oak Hill Methodist Episcopal Church =

Historic church in New York, United States

- U.S. National Register of Historic Places
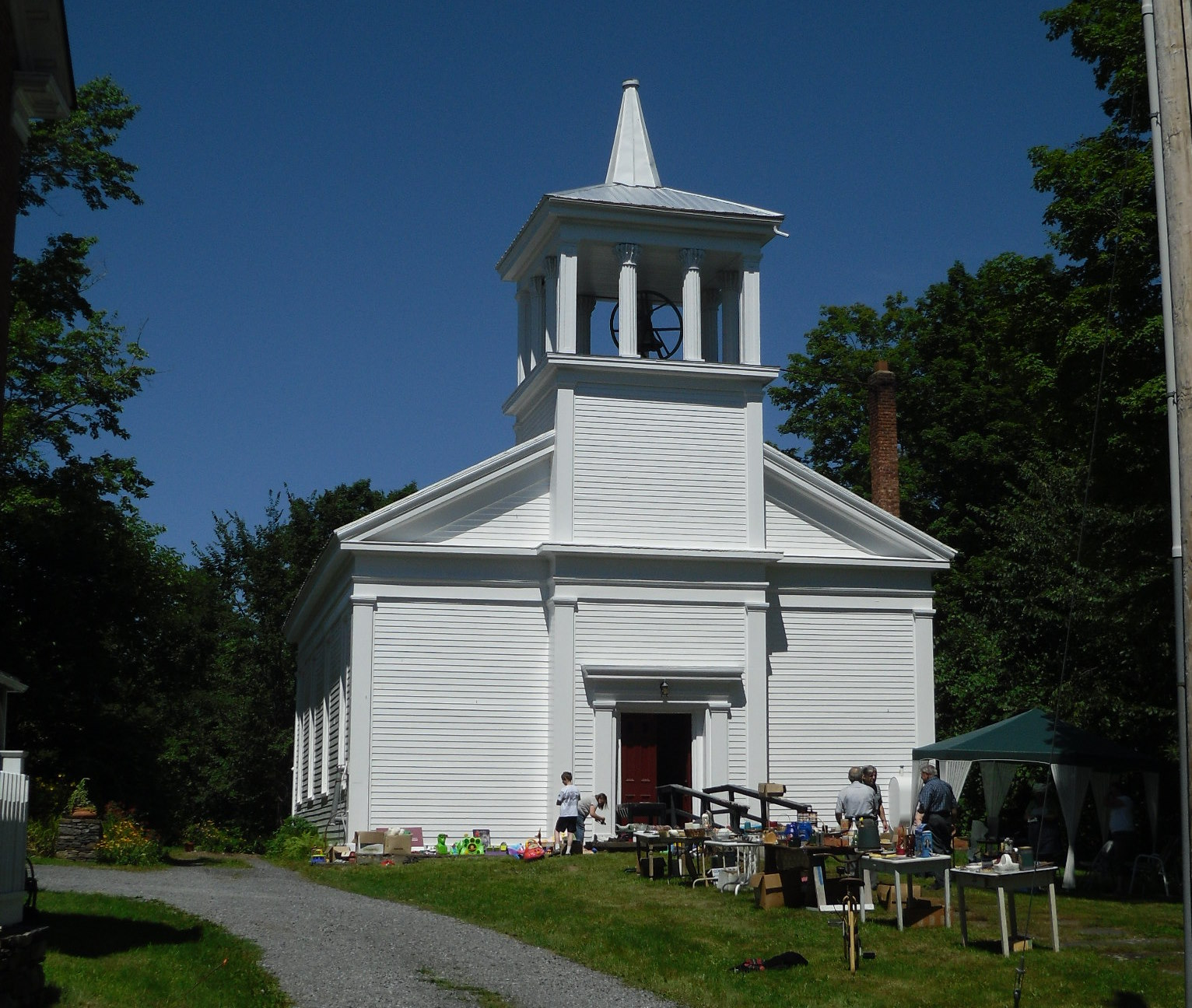
- Oak Hill Methodist Episcopal Church, July 2010

- Location within New York Location within the United States
- Nearest city: Oak Hill, New York
- Coordinates: 42°24′45″N 74°9′18″W
- Area: 4.9 acres (2.0 ha)
- Built: 1859
- Architectural style: Greek Revival
- NRHP reference No.: 06000972
- Added to NRHP: November 1, 2006

Oak Hill Methodist Episcopal Church, also known as Durham-Oak Hill Methodist Church, is a historic Methodist Episcopal church in Oak Hill, Greene County, New York. It was built about 1859 and is a one-story, roughly square shaped frame building of the traditional meetinghouse type. It features an engaged central tower and Greek Revival style features.

It was added to the National Register of Historic Places in 2006.

== See also ==
- National Register of Historic Places listings in Greene County, New York
