= East Hill (Schoharie County, New York) =

Mountain in New York, United States

- Location within New York Adirondack Park Location within the United States

Highest point
- Elevation: 2,146 feet (654 m)
- Coordinates: 42°31′58″N 74°16′18″W

Geography
- Location: SE of Middleburgh, New York, U.S.
- Topo map: USGS Middleburgh

East Hill is a mountain in Schoharie County, New York. It is located southeast of Middleburgh. Dutton Ridge is located south-southeast and Windy Ridge is located northwest of East Hill.
