= Cornwallville, New York =

- Hamlet
- Location within New York Location within the United States
- Coordinates: 42°22′05″N 74°09′29″W
- Country: United States
- State: New York
- County: Greene
- Town: Durham
- Elevation: 958 ft (292 m)
- Time zone: UTC-5 (Eastern (EST))
  - Summer (DST): UTC-4 (EDT)
- ZIP code: 12418
- Area code: 518
- GNIS feature ID: 947485

Cornwallville is a hamlet in the town of Durham, Greene County, New York, United States. The zipcode is: 12418. Its estimated population in 2018 was 408.
