= Potter Hollow District No. 19 School =

- U.S. National Register of Historic Places
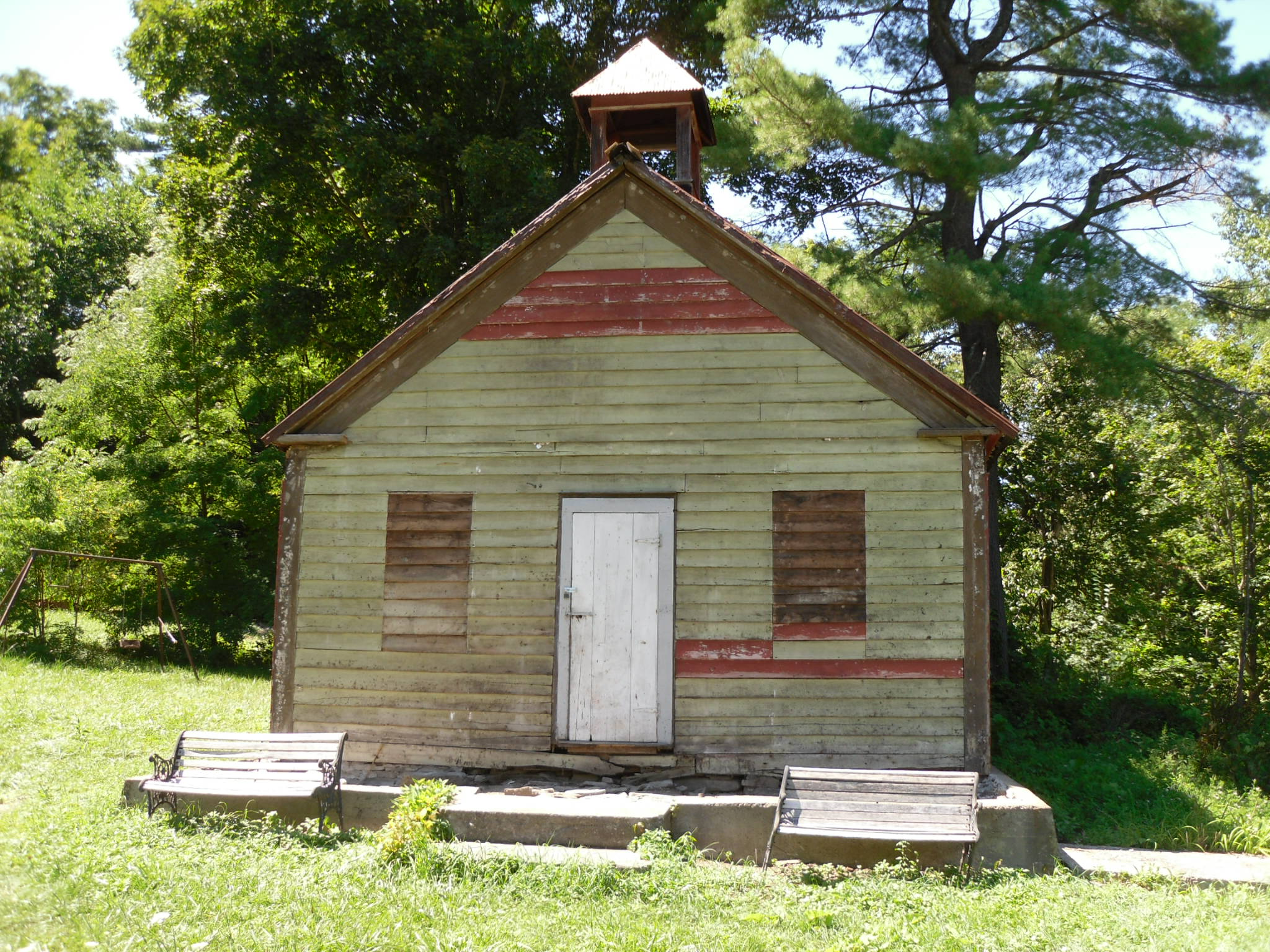
- Potter Hollow District No. 19 School, July 2010

- Location within New York Location within the United States
- Location: County Road 354, near Potter Hollow, New York
- Coordinates: 42°25′25″N 74°13′35″W
- Area: 1.06 acres (0.43 ha)
- Built: 1853
- NRHP reference No.: 11000993
- Added to NRHP: January 4, 2012

Potter Hollow District No. 19 School is a historic one-room school building located near Potter Hollow, Albany County, New York. It was built in 1853, and is a 1 1/2-story, rectangular timber frame building on a stone foundation. It is three bays wide and five bays wide, with a steeply pitched gable roof and belfry.

It was listed on the U.S. National Register of Historic Places in 2012.
