= Mount Royal (New York) =

Mountain in New York, United States

- Location within New York Adirondack Park Location within the United States

Highest point
- Elevation: 1,837 feet (560 m)
- Coordinates: 42°22′02″N 74°25′31″W

Geography
- Location: SSW of West Conesville, New York, U.S.
- Topo map: USGS Prattsville

Mount Royal is a mountain in Schoharie County, New York. It is located south-southwest of West Conesville. Sicklers Mountain is located east and Stevens Mountain is located north of Mount Royal.
