= Franklinton Vlaie =

River in New York, United States

Coordinates: 42°31′52″N 074°18′16″W

Franklinton Vlaie or "The Vlaie" is a tributary of Catskill Creek in Broome, Schoharie County, New York in the United States.

Vlaie or Vly is a word for swamp which comes from the Dutch settlers of the area.

== See also ==
- List of rivers of New York
