= Stevens Mountain =

Mountain in New York, United States

- Location within New York Location within the United States

Highest point
- Elevation: 1,844 feet (562 m)
- Coordinates: 42°23′17″N 74°25′45″W

Geography
- Location: Gilboa, New York, U.S.
- Topo map: USGS Gilboa

Stevens Mountain is a mountain located in the Catskill Mountains of New York southeast of Gilboa. Reed Hill is located north-northwest, Bull Hill is located northeast, and Mount Royal is located south of Sicklers Mountain.
