= Durham, New York =

- Town
- Seal

- Location in Greene County and the state of New York.
- Coordinates: 42°23′N 74°9′W
- Country: United States
- State: New York
- County: Greene

Government
  - Type: Town Council
  - Town Supervisor: William A. Carr, Jr (R)

Area
  - Total: 49.36 sq mi (127.83 km^{2})
  - Land: 49.31 sq mi (127.72 km^{2})
  - Water: 0.042 sq mi (0.11 km^{2})
- Elevation: 925 ft (282 m)

Population (2020)
  - Total: 2,627
  - Density: 53.27/sq mi (20.57/km^{2})
- Time zone: UTC-5 (Eastern (EST))
  - Summer (DST): UTC-4 (EDT)
- ZIP Codes: 12422 (Durham); 12418 (Cornwallville); 12423 (East Durham); 12460 (Oak Hill); 12083 (Greenville); 12120 (Medusa); 12405 (Acra); 12413 (Cairo); 12439 (Hensonville); 12469 (Preston Hollow)
- Area code: 518
- FIPS code: 36-21204
- GNIS feature ID: 978913
- Website: durhamny.gov

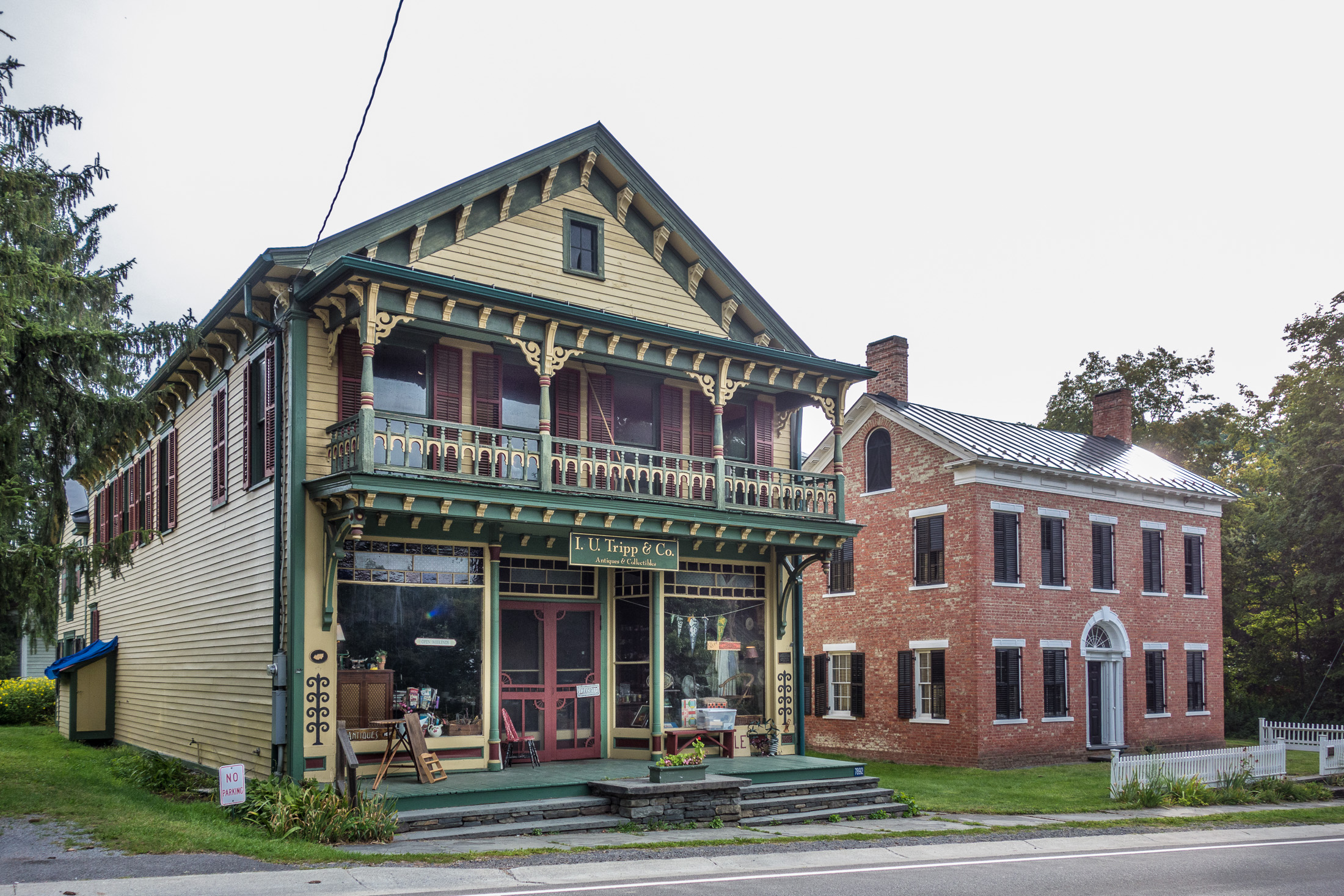
Tripp House and Store Complex

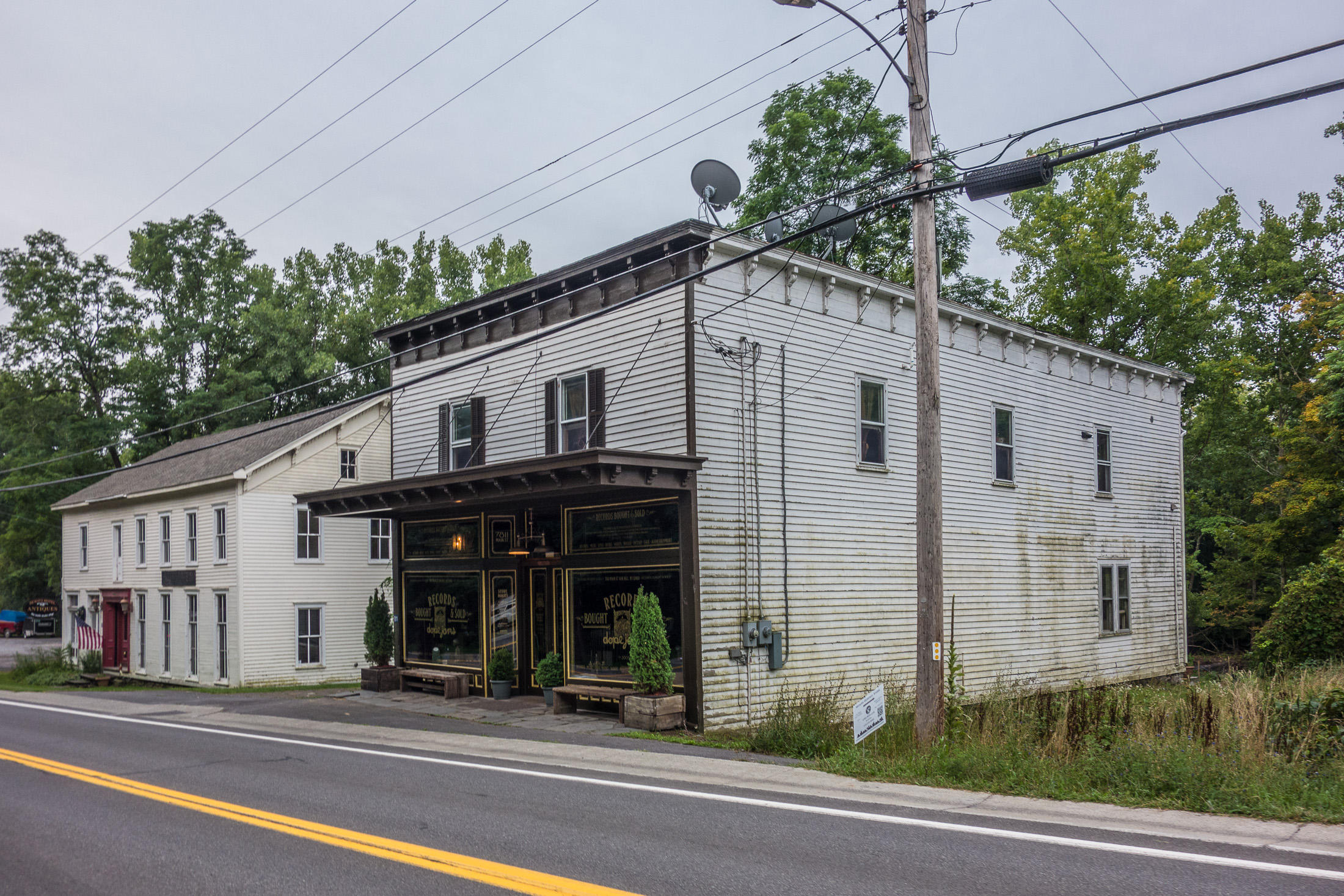
Historic W. F. DeWitt Hotel and Ford's Store

Durham is a town in Greene County, New York, United States. The population was 2,627 at the 2020 census. The town was named after Durham, Connecticut, and is in the northwestern corner of Greene County.

== History ==
The land that would become the town was first settled circa 1755 within Albany County. The town was established from part of the town of Coxsackie in 1790 as the "Town of Freehold". In the spring of 1800, Freehold became part of the newly formed Greene County. The town's name was changed to "Durham" in 1805, the town having been called informally "New Durham" by the many settlers from Connecticut.

Part of the town was lost in 1803 to form the new towns of Cairo, Greenville, and Windham. In 1836, the western part of Durham became the town of Conesville in Schoharie County.

The first documented visit to the Durham area was by Eliab Youmans, who had been commissioned to survey the Maitland patents in 1767. Undoubtedly, explorers, hunters, and trappers preceded Youmans, but their travels were unrecorded. The patents were the first official parceling out of the largely unclaimed land and were the precursors to settlement. Eight patents have been identified for lands that were in, or partly in, the town of Durham.

Historically, the Maitland Patent is the one most often cited, despite the fact that it was not one of the first grants. The grant, which was the first to lie exclusively in the future town of Durham, is historically significant as being the location for land described in the first known recorded lease in Durham and thus contains the first documentation for the initial settlement of the town. This patent of 5,000 acres (2,000 ha) was made to Colonel Richard Maitland, a British army officer of Scottish birth. The patent encompassed land that now includes the Oak Hill area, as well as surrounding farmland leased by the earliest settlers. The first known lease was to Lucas DeWitt, dated May 3, 1774, for property in "DeWittsburg". The language of that lease suggests an occupation of the land by the earlier settlers, perhaps by 1771. In the early nineteenth century, Oak Hill matured into a vigorous industrial hamlet with highly productive mills and many fashionable homes.

The establishment of the first settlement in Durham is credited to three men: Lucas DeWitt, John Plank, and Hendrick Plank. These pioneers established homes at what was then called DeWittsburg, now Oak Hill. The American Revolution forced the pioneers to temporarily abandon their homes until the end of the war. Hendrick Plank was abducted by the Native Americans and removed to Canada, where he died in captivity. The two remaining pioneers and Hendrick's widow, who remarried to Leonard Patrie, all returned by approximately 1782 to reestablish their homes. DeWitt brought with him a small hand mill for grinding grain and was, in one respect, the first miller in the town, as well as being a farmer.

== Geography ==
According to the United States Census Bureau, the town has a total area of 49.3 square miles (128 km^{2}), of which 49.2 square miles (127 km^{2}) is land and 0.04 square miles (0.10 km^{2}), or 0.04%, is water.

The north town line is the border of Albany County, and part of the west town line is the border of Schoharie County.

== Demographics ==
Historical population
Census	Pop.	Note	%±
1820	2,979		—
1830	3,039		2.0%
1840	2,813		−7.4%
1850	2,600		−7.6%
1860	2,558		−1.6%
1870	2,257		−11.8%
1880	2,173		−3.7%
1890	1,925		−11.4%
1900	1,636		−15.0%
1910	1,475		−9.8%
1920	1,211		−17.9%
1930	1,104		−8.8%
1940	1,223		10.8%
1950	1,233		0.8%
1960	1,313		6.5%
1970	1,651		25.7%
1980	2,283		38.3%
1990	2,324		1.8%
2000	2,592		11.5%
2010	2,725		5.1%
2020	2,627		−3.6%
U.S. Decennial Census 2020

=== 2010 ===
As of the census of 2010, there were 2,725 people, 1,152 households, and 770 families residing in the town. The population density was 55.3 inhabitants per square mile (21.4/km^{2}). There were 1,807 housing units at an average density of 36.7 per square mile (14.2/km^{2}). The racial makeup of the town was 97.5% White, 0.6% African American, 0.03% Native American, 0.22% Asian, 0.3% from other races, and 1.2% from two or more races. Hispanic or Latino of any race were 2.3% of the population.

There were 1,152 households, out of which 24.0% had children under the age of 18 living with them, 49.7% were married couples living together, 10.9% had a female householder with no husband present, and 22.5% were non-families. 25.2% of all households were made up of individuals, and 34.5% had someone living alone who was 65 years of age or older. The average household size was 2.37 and the average family size was 2.82.

In the town, the population was spread out, with 22.6% of people the age of 19 or younger, 4.5% from 20 to 24, 24.0% from 25 to 44, 33.4% from 45 to 64, and 20.4% who were 65 years of age or older (555 people age 65 and older). The median age was 46 years. For every 100 males there were 98.2 females. For every 100 males age 18 and over, there were 99.3 females.

The 2014 American Community Survey reports that median income for a household in the town was $41,944, and the median income for a family was $59,655. About 10.5% of families and 12.0% of the population were below the poverty line, including 17.3% of those under age 18 and 5.7% of those age 65 or over.

== Communities and locations in Durham ==
- Cornwallville — A hamlet south of Durham village on Route 20. It is the location of the Moore Road Stone Arch Bridge and Shady Glen Road Stone Arch Bridge, listed on the National Register of Historic Places in 2008.
- Durso Corner — A hamlet east of East Windham on Route 23.
- Durham — the hamlet of Durham in the northern part of the town on Route 145.
- East Durham — A hamlet southeast of Durham village on Route 145.
- East Windham — A hamlet at the southern town line on Route 23.
- Hervey Street — A hamlet near the southern town line. It is the location of the Hervey Street Road Stone Arch Bridge, listed on the National Register of Historic Places in 2008.
- Mount Pisgah — An elevation at the western town line.
- Oak Hill — A hamlet northeast of Durham village, located on Route 81.
- Sunside — A hamlet in the southeastern part of the town.
- South Durham — A hamlet in the southeastern section of the town on Route 23.
- West Durham — A hamlet near the western town line on Route 20.

== Notable people ==
- John Adams (1778–1854), U.S. congressman from New York, taught school and practiced law here
- Brooks Atkinson (1894–1984), journalist, for 31 years drama critic of The New York Times
- Dwight Baldwin (1798–1886), missionary in Hawaii, born in Durham, Connecticut, raised in Durham, New York
- Blossom Dearie (1924–2009), jazz singer, grew up in East Durham
- Alfred W. Newman (1834–1898), Wisconsin Supreme Court
