= Basic Creek Reservoir =

Reservoir in Westerlo, New York, U.S.

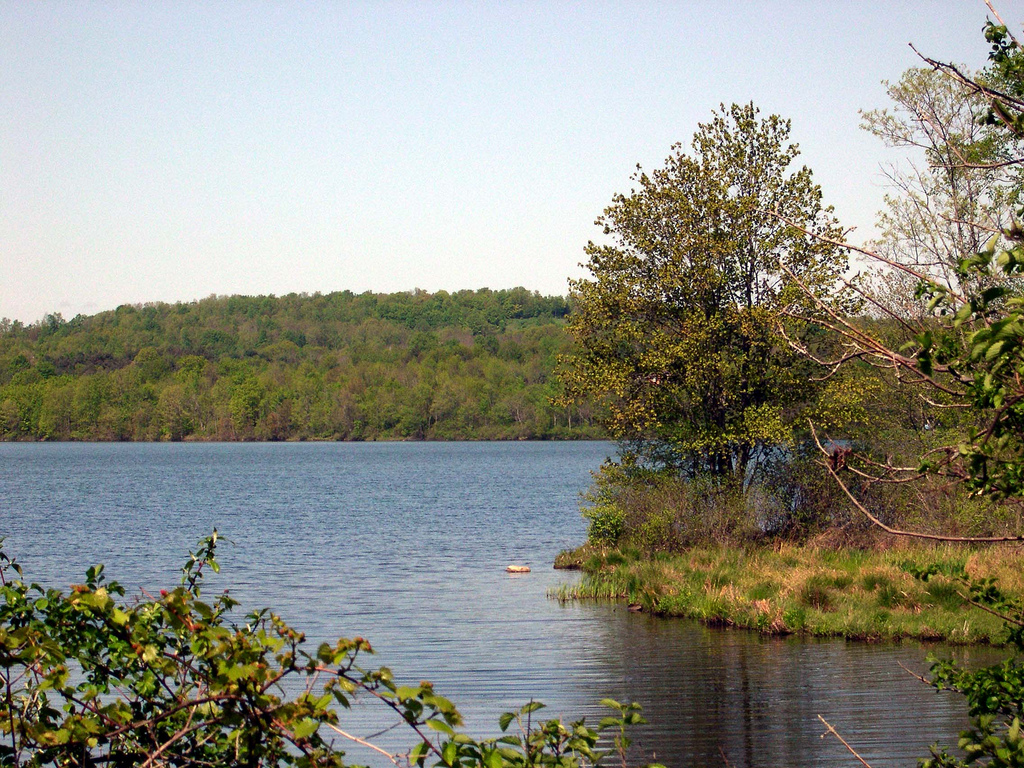

- Location within New York Location within the United States
- Location: Westerlo, New York
- Coordinates: 42°28′39″N 74°00′53″W
- Type: Reservoir
- Basin countries: United States
- Average depth: 17 ft (5.2 m)
- Shore length^{1}: 4 mi (6.4 km)
- Surface elevation: 935 ft (285 m)
- ^{1} Shore length is not a well-defined measure.

The Basic Creek Reservoir is one of three reservoirs in the City of Albany, New York's water system. The reservoir is located in Westerlo, New York and was constructed from 1928 to 1932 by damming the Basic Creek and flooding former farmland and forest. It is bisected by the Albany County Route 404 causeway.

The Basic Creek Reservoir serves as a feeder reservoir, allowing water from the Basic Creek watershed to be diverted to the Hannacroix Creek, which in turn flows into the Alcove Reservoir, the primary source of water for the city.

Fishing is allowed in the Basic Creek Reservoir if a permit is bought. There are smallmouth bass, largemouth bass, black crappie, walleye, bluegill, northern pike, and chain pickerel.

== Selected statistics ==
- 716 million US gallons storage
- Average Depth: 17 feet (5.2 m)
- 265 acres (1.07 km^{2}) water
- 5 miles (8.0 km) of shoreline

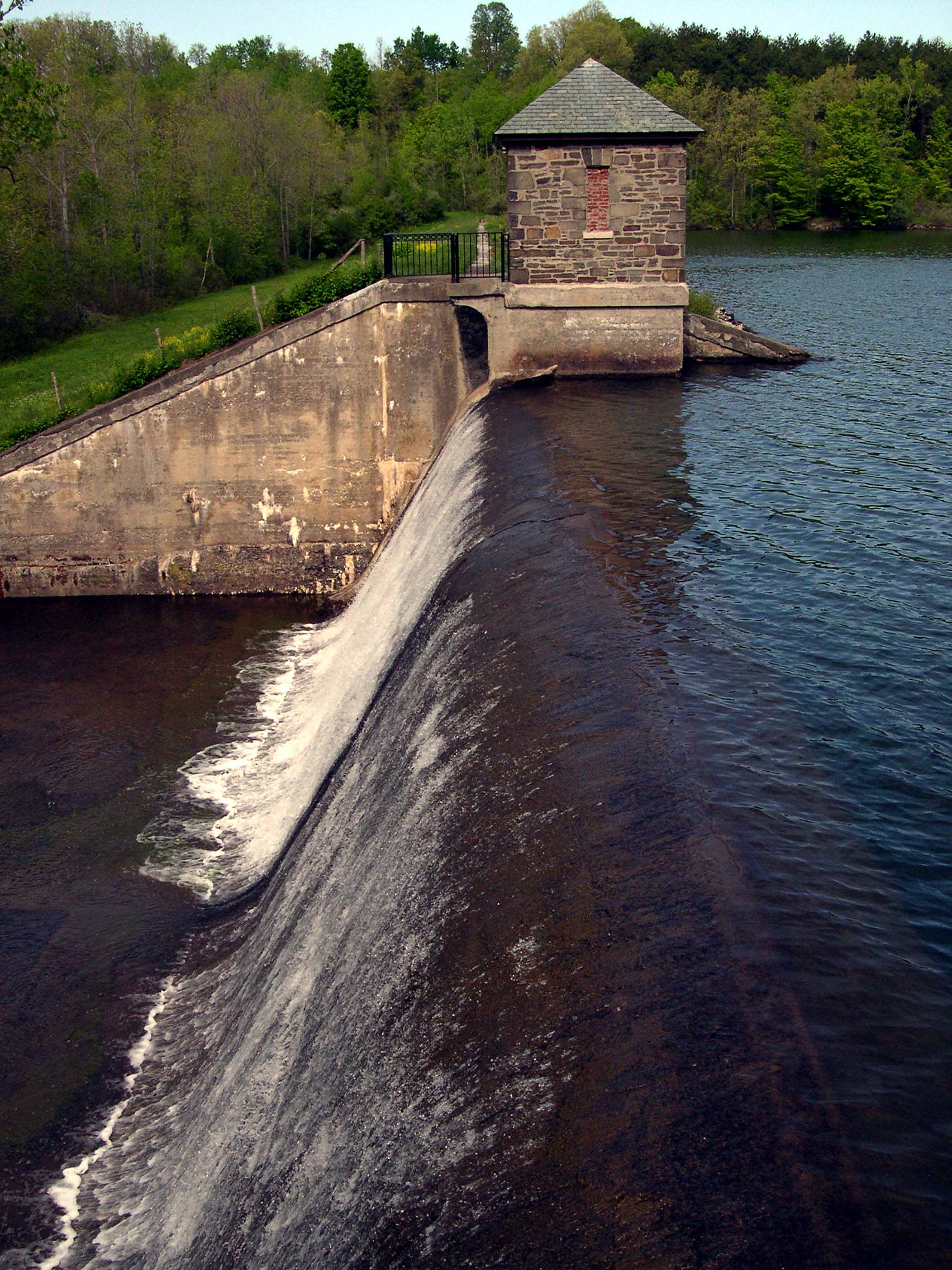
Spillway
