= Catskill Creek =

River in New York, US

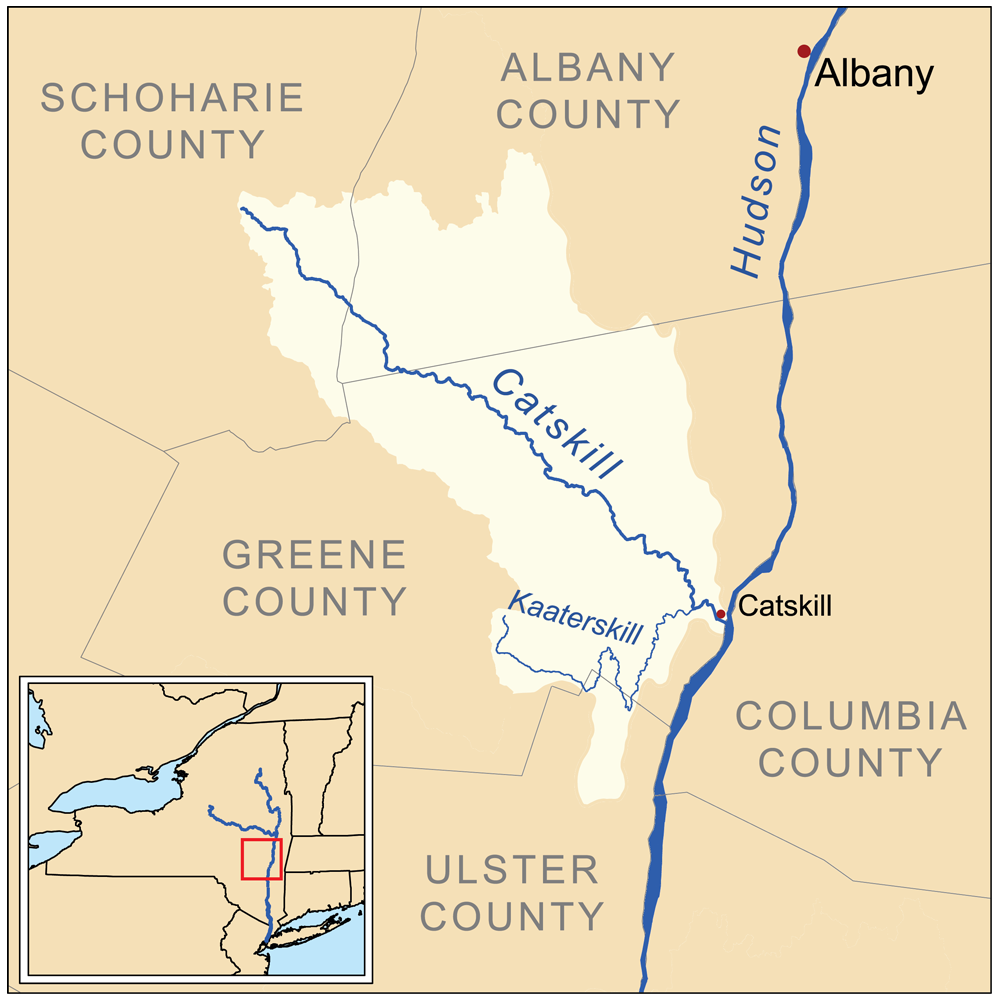
- Etymology: “Kat's Creek” in Dutch

Location
- Country: United States
- State: New York
- Region: Catskills, Hudson Valley
- County: Greene
- Towns: Catskill, New York,

Physical characteristics
- Source: Franklinton Vlaie Pond
  - location: Broome, New York
  - coordinates: 42°31′15.32″N 74°18′21.56″W
- Mouth: Hudson River at Catskill, New York
  - location: Catskill, New York
  - coordinates: 42°12′29.98″N 73°51′16.03″W
  - elevation: 0 ft (0 m)
- Basin size: 394 sq mi (1,020 km^{2})

Basin features
- River system: Hudson River

Catskill Creek is a 46.0-mile-long (74.0 km) tributary of the Hudson River that drains the northeastern Catskill Mountains of the U.S. State of New York. From its source at Franklinton Vlaie in Schoharie County it flows southeast through parts of Albany County and Greene County to its mouth at the village of Catskill on the Hudson River.

Like Fishkill Creek, Catskill Creek is tautological, literally repeating "creek" twice, as kill is Dutch for "creek".

== Tributaries ==
- Lake Creek
- Fox Creek
- Potter Hollow Creek
- Tenmile Creek
  - Eightmile Creek
- Thorpe Creek
  - Cornwallville Creek
  - Fall Creek
- Bowery Creek
- Basic Creek—May be a corruption of a Mahican word meaning "valley".
- Platte Kill
- Shingle Kill
- Jan De Bakkers Kill
- Bell Brook
- Potic Creek—likely from a Mahican name referring to a waterfall or set of rapids.
  - Cob Creek
  - Grapeville Creek
    - West Medway Creek
- Lake Brook
- Kaaterskill Creek
  - Beaver Kill
  - Kiskatom Brook—from a Mahican name referring to the shagbark hickory tree.
- Hans Vosen Kill

== See also ==
- List of rivers of New York
