= Preston-Potter Hollow, New York =

- Census-designated place
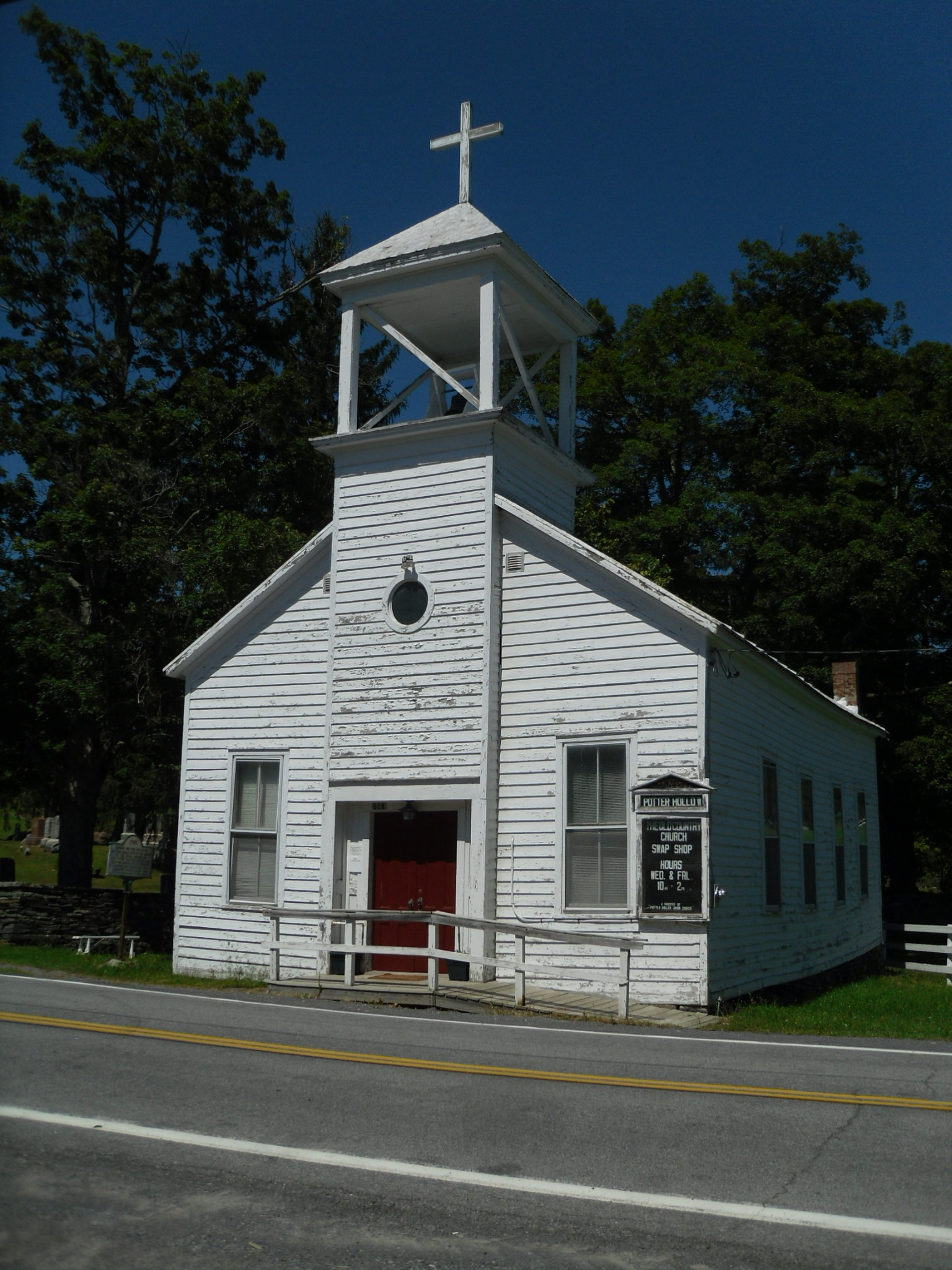
- Church in Preston-Potter Hollow

- Location in Albany County and the state of New York.
- Coordinates: 42°25′53″N 74°13′23″W
- Country: United States
- State: New York
- County: Albany
- Town: Rensselaerville

Area
  - Total: 10.14 sq mi (26.25 km^{2})
  - Land: 10.14 sq mi (26.25 km^{2})
  - Water: 0 sq mi (0.00 km^{2})

Population (2020)
  - Total: 367
  - Density: 36.2/sq mi (13.98/km^{2})
- Time zone: UTC-5 (Eastern (EST))
  - Summer (DST): UTC-4 (EDT)
- ZIP Code: 12469 (Preston Hollow)
- FIPS code: 36-59831

Preston-Potter Hollow is a census-designated place (CDP) in Albany County, New York, United States. As of the 2020 census, Preston-Potter Hollow had a population of 367.

Preston and Potter Hollow are two hamlets in the town of Rensselaerville, located in the southwestern corner of Albany County. The communities are near the border of Greene County.

== History ==
The Potter Hollow District No. 19 School and Sidney White House are listed on the National Register of Historic Places.

== Geography ==
Preston-Potter Hollow is located at 42°25′53″N 74°13′23″W (42.431357, -74.223113).

According to the United States Census Bureau, the CDP has a total area of 10.1 square miles (26 km^{2}), all land.

It is also the topographical location of Potter Hollow.

== Demographics ==
Historical population
Census	Pop.	Note	%±
2020	367		—
U.S. Decennial Census

As of the census of 2000, there were 374 people, 152 households, and 103 families residing in the CDP. The population density was 37.0 inhabitants per square mile (14.3/km^{2}). There were 235 housing units at an average density of 23.2 per square mile (9.0/km^{2}). The racial makeup of the CDP was 94.65% White, 3.48% African American, 0.27% Asian, and 1.60% from two or more races. Hispanic or Latino of any race were 0.27% of the population.

There were 152 households, out of which 29.6% had children under the age of 18 living with them, 50.0% were married couples living together, 13.2% had a female householder with no husband present, and 32.2% were non-families. 27.0% of all households were made up of individuals, and 11.8% had someone living alone who was 65 years of age or older. The average household size was 2.46 and the average family size was 3.00.

In the CDP, the population was spread out, with 27.5% under the age of 18, 7.0% from 18 to 24, 21.9% from 25 to 44, 30.5% from 45 to 64, and 13.1% who were 65 years of age or older. The median age was 42 years. For every 100 females, there were 90.8 males. For every 100 females age 18 and over, there were 99.3 males.

The median income for a household in the CDP was $33,929, and the median income for a family was $37,188. Males had a median income of $32,708 versus $29,583 for females. The per capita income for the CDP was $16,679. About 7.6% of families and 10.2% of the population were below the poverty line, including 12.6% of those under age 18 and 7.4% of those age 65 or over.
