= Livingstonville, New York =

Livingstonville
- hamlet
- Location of Livingstonville in New York
- Coordinates: 42°29′15″N 74°16′07″W
- Country: United States
- State: New York
- County: Schoharie
- ZIP code: 12122

Livingstonville is a hamlet within the town of Broome in Schoharie County, New York, United States. It is inhabited by a small but decreasing population.

== History ==
Located in the southern portion of Schoharie County, Livingstonville lies between Middleburgh and Durham. The hamlet was settled by the British in the seventeenth century.

Located in the northern tier of the Catskill Mountains, settlement was not facilitated by terrain. The Catskill Creek, which flows through Livingstonville, is too shallow to allow significant travel.

Early in the nineteenth century, the town of Broome was incorporated into Schoharie County. Livingstonville is the largest hamlet in the town and is where the highway department is located.

For Schoharie County residents, Livingstonville was notable as the home of the "Trailer Graveyard", where hundreds of abandoned trailers were left near a pond. In the 2000s, this pile was cleared. Now cleaned, the pond has been restored to its natural state.

== Today ==
Livingstonville is located in a valley. The Town of Broome volunteer fire department, which is located in Livingstonville, offers Bingo in the spring and summer, Seasonal Dances, Pot Luck Dinners, as well as a Labor Day BBQ which people from various states attend. During the months between May thru October there is a flea market.

Students from Livingstonville attend Middleburgh Central School. Livingstonville is also in Middleburgh's Zip Code of 12122.

The Livingstonville Community Church was listed on the National Register of Historic Places in 2008.
