= Broome, New York =

Town in Schoharie County, New York, US

- Town
- Location in Schoharie County and the state of New York.
- Coordinates: 42°30′33″N 74°18′26″W
- Country: United States
- State: New York
- County: Schoharie

Area
  - Total: 47.99 sq mi (124.30 km^{2})
  - Land: 47.74 sq mi (123.65 km^{2})
  - Water: 0.25 sq mi (0.65 km^{2})
- Elevation: 1,152 ft (351 m)

Population (2020)
  - Total: 863
  - Density: 18.1/sq mi (6.98/km^{2})
- Time zone: UTC-5 (Eastern (EST))
  - Summer (DST): UTC-4 (EDT)
- FIPS code: 36-10154
- GNIS feature ID: 0978760

Broome is a town in Schoharie County, New York, United States. The population was 863 at the 2020 census. The town is named after John Broome.

The Town of Broome is on the eastern border of the county, southwest of Albany.

== History ==
The town was one of the six original towns when the county was formed in 1797. Originally named Bristol, the town name was changed to Broome in 1808. Parts of Broome town were taken to form part of Conesville town in 1836 and part of Gilboa town in 1848 and small parts annexed to Broome town from Middleburgh town in 1849.

Few settlers came to Broome until after the American Revolution.

== Notable people ==
- Daniel Shays, leader of Shays' Rebellion.
- David Williams, officer involved in the capture of Major Andre.

== Geography ==
According to the United States Census Bureau, the town has a total area of 48.1 square miles (125 km^{2}), of which 47.8 square miles (124 km^{2}) is land and 0.3 square miles (0.78 km^{2}) (0.58%) is water.

The eastern town line is the border of Albany County.

Catskill Creek originates in Broome.

New York State Route 145 is a north-south highway which passes through Broome.

== Demographics ==
Historical population
Census	Pop.	Note	%±
1800	1,078		—
1810	1,942		80.1%
1820	2,680		38.0%
1830	3,167		18.2%
1840	2,404		−24.1%
1850	2,268		−5.7%
1860	2,182		−3.8%
1870	1,834		−15.9%
1880	1,636		−10.8%
1890	1,367		−16.4%
1900	1,153		−15.7%
1910	933		−19.1%
1920	743		−20.4%
1930	650		−12.5%
1940	768		18.2%
1950	635		−17.3%
1960	517		−18.6%
1970	551		6.6%
1980	761		38.1%
1990	926		21.7%
2000	947		2.3%
2010	973		2.7%
2020	863		−11.3%
U.S. Decennial Census

As of the census of 2000, there were 947 people, 407 households, and 260 families residing in the town. The population density was 19.8 inhabitants per square mile (7.6/km^{2}). There were 767 housing units at an average density of 16.1 per square mile (6.2/km^{2}). The racial makeup of the town was 96.41% White, 0.74% African American, 0.32% Native American, 0.11% Asian, 0.74% from other races, and 1.69% from two or more races. Hispanic or Latino of any race were 1.80% of the population.

There were 407 households, out of which 23.8% had children under the age of 18 living with them, 53.6% were married couples living together, 5.9% had a female householder with no husband present, and 36.1% were non-families. 30.0% of all households were made up of individuals, and 12.3% had someone living alone who was 65 years of age or older. The average household size was 2.33 and the average family size was 2.91.

In the town, the population was spread out, with 20.9% under the age of 18, 5.8% from 18 to 24, 25.4% from 25 to 44, 29.4% from 45 to 64, and 18.5% who were 65 years of age or older. The median age was 44 years. For every 100 females, there were 99.8 males. For every 100 females age 18 and over, there were 103.0 males.

The median income for a household in the town was $32,368, and the median income for a family was $40,167. Males had a median income of $30,500 versus $23,750 for females. The per capita income for the town was $16,383. About 5.4% of families and 8.4% of the population were below the poverty line, including 2.5% of those under age 18 and 9.0% of those age 65 or over.

== Communities and locations in Broome ==
- Bates (formerly "Bates Hollow") – A hamlet in the southeastern part of the town.
- Franklinton (also called "The Vly") – A location in the north-central part of Broome on NY-145, south of Vlaie Pond.
- Hauversville – A hamlet near the eastern town line.
- Livingstonville – A hamlet in the southeastern part of the town on NY-145 and Catskill Creek.
- Pine Grove – A location northwest of Hauversville.
- Vlaie Pond – A small lake in the northern part of Broome.
- Vlaie Pond-Franklinton Wildlife Management Area – A conservation area by Vlai Pond.
