= Medusa, New York =

- Hamlet
- Location within New York Location within the United States
- Coordinates: 42°26′12″N 074°07′48″W
- Country: United States
- State: New York
- County: Albany County
- Town: Rensselaerville

Area (2000 Census)
  - Total: 6.86 sq mi (17.8 km^{2})
  - Land: 6.79 sq mi (17.6 km^{2})
  - Water: 0.07 sq mi (0.18 km^{2})
- Elevation: 804 ft (245 m)

Population (2000)
  - Total: 376
  - Density: 55/sq mi (21.4/km^{2})
- Time zone: UTC-5 (Eastern (EST))
  - Summer (DST): UTC-4 (EDT)
- ZIP code: 12120
- Area code: 518
- FIPS code: 36-46426
- GNIS feature ID: 956907
- Website: www.rensselaerville.com

Medusa is a hamlet in the Town of Rensselaerville, in Albany County, New York, United States. The population was 376 at the 2000 census, which listed the community as a census-designated place (CDP), but it was not included as a CDP in the 2010 census.

== History ==
First settled in 1786 by Uriah Hall and his son Joshua, Medusa's first name was Hall's Mills after those first settlers. In 1850, the name of the village was changed to Medusa; at that time the village contained a Methodist Episcopal and a "Christian" Church, a hotel, two stores, two mills for grain, turning works, an evaporator, paper mill, carpenter's shop, and two blacksmith's shops.

== Geography ==
Medusa is located at 42°26′12″N 074°07′48″W (42.4367469, -74.1301365) and its elevation is 804 feet (245 m).

According to the United States Census Bureau, the CDP has a total area of 6.86 square miles (17.8 km^{2}), of which 6.79 square miles (17.6 km^{2}) is land and 0.07 square miles (0.18 km^{2}) (1.02%) is water.

== Demographics ==
As of the census of 2000, there were 376 people, 147 households, and 104 families residing in the CDP. The population density was 55.4 inhabitants per square mile (21.4/km^{2}). There were 183 housing units at an average density of 27.0 per square mile (10.4/km^{2}). The racial makeup of the CDP was 99.20% White, 0.27% Native American, 0.27% Asian, and 0.27% from two or more races. Hispanic or Latino of any race were 0.27% of the population.

There were 147 households, out of which 33.3% had children under the age of 18 living with them, 59.9% were married couples living together, 4.8% had a female householder with no husband present, and 28.6% were non-families. 21.8% of all households were made up of individuals, and 7.5% had someone living alone who was 65 years of age or older. The average household size was 2.56 and the average family size was 3.04.

In the CDP, the population was spread out, with 25.5% under the age of 18, 5.6% from 18 to 24, 25.8% from 25 to 44, 26.9% from 45 to 64, and 16.2% who were 65 years of age or older. The median age was 41 years. For every 100 females, there were 105.5 males. For every 100 females age 18 and over, there were 105.9 males.

The median income for a household in the CDP was $44,688, and the median income for a family was $50,000. Males had a median income of $35,833 versus $28,750 for females. The per capita income for the CDP was $19,716. About 4.6% of families and 6.7% of the population were below the poverty line, including 10.4% of those under age 18 and none of those age 65 or over.
