= Batavia Kill (Schoharie Creek tributary) =

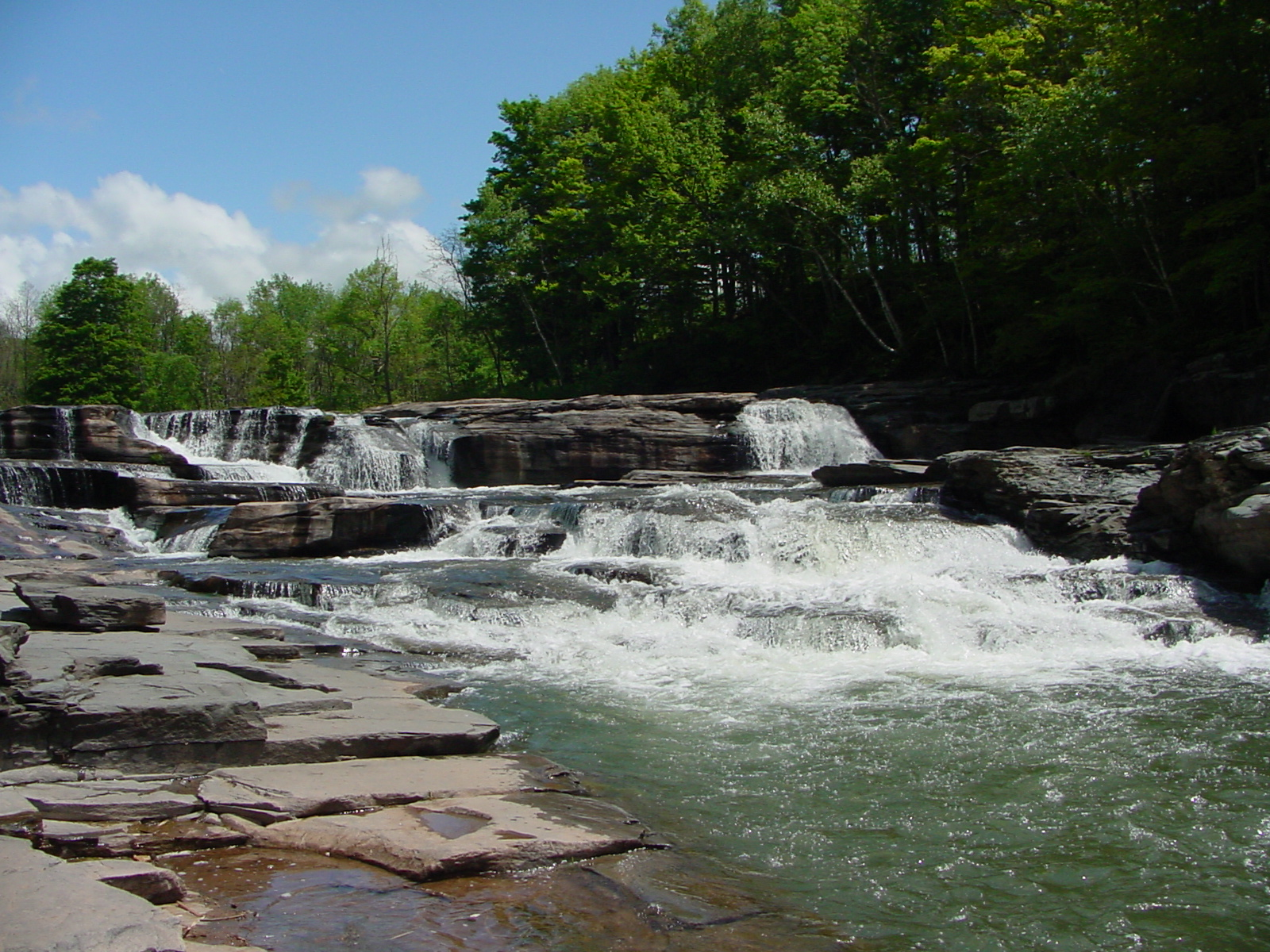
- Red Falls

- Location of mouth within New York Batavia Kill (Schoharie Creek tributary) (the United States)
- Native name: Chough-tig-hig-nick

Location
- Country: United States
- State: New York
- Region: Catskill Mountains
- County: Greene
- Towns: Windham, Ashland, Prattsville

Physical characteristics
- Source: NNE slopes of Blackhead Mountain
  - location: Greene County, New York
  - coordinates: 42°16′25″N 74°06′03″W
- Mouth: Schoharie Creek
  - location: SE of Prattsville
  - coordinates: 42°18′08″N 74°25′15″W
  - elevation: 1,158 ft (353 m)
- Basin size: 73.2 sq mi (190 km^{2})
- Discharge
  - location: Red Falls
  - minimum: 1.7 cu ft/s (0.048 m^{3}/s)
  - maximum: 44,200 cu ft/s (1,250 m^{3}/s)

Basin features
- Progression: Batavia Kill → Schoharie Creek → Mohawk River → Hudson River → Upper New York Bay
- Tributaries
  - right: Mad Brook, North Settlement Brook, West Hollow Brook, Lewis Creek
- Waterfalls: Red Falls

Batavia Kill is a 21-mile-long (34 km) tributary of Schoharie Creek that flows across the towns of Windham, Ashland and Prattsville in the U.S. state of New York. Its waters reach the Hudson River via Schoharie Creek and the Mohawk River. Since it drains into the Schoharie upstream of Schoharie Reservoir, it is part of the New York City water supply system. From the source to Maplecrest, Batavia Kill drains the northern slopes of the Blackhead Mountains, which include Thomas Cole Mountain, Black Dome, and Blackhead Mountain, the fourth-, third-, and fifth-highest peaks in the Catskills, respectively.

The Batavia Kill's 73.2-square-mile (190 km^{2}) watershed accounts for 7.9 percent of the Schoharie Creek's watershed, and about 30 percent of the Schoharie Reservoir's watershed.

== Course ==
Batavia Kill begins on the north-northeast slopes of Blackhead Mountain and starts travelling northwest as it gains an unnamed tributary draining northeast slopes of Black Dome. The kill continues northwest and gains an unnamed tributary draining the southwest slopes of Acra Point. It slowly curves southwest as it descends the Black Dome Valley and enters the hamlet of Maplecrest, where it curves back to the northwest. The creek then passes through Hensonville, passes under New York State Route 296 as it curves to the west, and begins to parallel New York State Route 23. It then enters the hamlet of Windham, where it receives Mitchell Hollow Brook from the north. It continues paralleling New York State Route 23 as it enters the town of Ashland. It soon enters the hamlet of Ashland, where it receives Sutton Hollow Brook from the north. The kill continues westward and soon receives Lewis Creek from the north. The kill then enters the town of Prattsville and soon flows over Red Falls by the hamlet of the same name. Batavia Kill then curves to the southwest, crosses under New York State Route 23A, then converges with Schoharie Creek southeast of the hamlet of Prattsville.

== Watershed ==
The Batavia Kill's 73.2-square-mile (190 km^{2}) watershed, flows 21 miles (34 km) through the towns of Windham, Ashland and Prattsville to its confluence with the Schoharie Creek, near the hamlet of Prattsville. From Big Hollow where the kill originates, it drops from about 3,600 feet (1,100 m) to 1,158 feet (353 m) at the mouth, a drop of about 2,440 feet (740 m).

The watershed is also asymmetrical, with the main Batavia Kill located on the south side of the watershed. The majority of the drainage area is north of the kill. The watershed is approximately 17-mile-long (27 km) and varies from 5 to 7 miles (8.0 to 11.3 km) wide.

Water withdrawn from the kill is approximately 286,000,000 US gallons (1,080,000 m^{3}) per year, which includes water taken from ground and surface water sources. About 55 percent of water withdrawn is by Ski Windham. Residential wells withdraw about 12 percent of the water withdrawals. Ski Windham can only take a maximum of 3,142 gallons per minute from the kill, which is regulated through a NYSDEC permit.

Within the watershed, the predominant land cover is undeveloped forested area, at 80 percent. Mixed grass and shrubs is the second most common land cover, with just over 1 percent being impervious surfaces and agricultural uses. This has not always been the case in the past, as most of the watershed was stripped of its trees during the 1700 and 1800s. As the watershed reverts to forests, total rainfall runoff and flashiness is decreasing. The National Wetlands Inventory maintained by the U.S. Fish and Wildlife Service has designated 1.9 percent, or 902 acres (1.409 mi^{2}), of the watershed as wetlands.

== Geology ==
While the Catskills originated during the Devonian period, around 375 million years ago, as a former river delta uplifted and became a dissected plateau, the Batavia Kill's valley was formed during the recent effects of the Wisconsin glaciation, which ended about 12,000 years ago.

The most recent geological impact on the kill was the recent Wisconsin Glaciation, which occurred around 16,000 years ago. The Wisconsin ice sheet was divided into three major lobes of southward moving ice. The easternmost lobe of the ice sheet, known as the Labrador lobe, was the one that last influenced the Batavia Kill watershed. Geological evidence within the area show that the Batavia Kill watershed was influenced by ice from four or more different directions. The glaciers moved through the Batavia Kill Valley almost to the Schoharie Creek, with ice also pushing into the upper Batavia Kill watershed. Also at this time, the Grand Gorge glacier was advancing up the Schoharie Valley and some of this ice pushed up the Batavia Kill valley, almost colliding with it. As the glaciers retreated, the Schoharie Valley was blocked by stalled ice near Grand Gorge, which developed a large lake. Parts of the lake extended deep into the Batavia Kill watershed. Present day evidence shows that this ancient lake extended as far as Big Hollow. As the glaciers retreated, they left layers of fine clay and silt. These same clay deposits effects water quality to this day, as the stream slowly erodes into these layers.

In the kill's watershed the bedrock exposed mostly in the higher elevations, with soils and other deposits covering the bedrock in the lower elevations. Most of the bedrock in the Batavia Kill watershed is fractured, which benefits groundwater retention and recharge. Roughly 91 percent of the soils covering the bedrock within the Batavia Kill watershed have mostly moderate to very poor permeability. As a result, the watershed is very sensitive to the effects of rainfall due to little precipitation infiltrating into the ground. The type of soils in the watershed are very prone to erosion, which contributes to excess sediment to enter into the stream system.

== Hydrology ==
=== Discharge ===
The Batavia Kill's watershed receives an average 42.5 inches (1,080 mm) of precipitation annually. The United States Geological Survey (USGS) maintains one stream gauge along Batavia Kill in operation since 1997. The station is located in Red Falls, 1.9 miles (3.1 km) upstream from the mouth, had a maximum discharge of 44,200 cubic feet (1,250 m^{3}) per second on August 28, 2011, as Hurricane Irene passed through the area, and a minimum discharge of 1.7 cubic feet (0.048 m^{3}) per second on September 8, 2007, and September 26, 2010. There was formerly a stream gauge located in Maplecrest that was in operation from October 1997 to June 2009.

In late August 2011, Tropical Storm Irene caused extensive flooding and devastation in the eastern New York. peaked at this location at 44,200 cfs. FEMA Flood Insurance Study predicts the 100-year flood by the Red Falls stream gauge to be 18,130 cubic feet (513 m^{3}) per second, and the 500-year flood to be 27,040 cubic feet (766 m^{3}) per second, therefore flows during Irene surpassed the projected 500-year level. Bank erosion and flood-related damages to buildings occurred in Maplecrest. A barn was destroyed in Maplecrest and the creek channel between Maplecrest and Hensonville changed and pushed multiple houses off of their foundations. Multiple farmers' crops were destroyed where it overflowed its bank.

=== Water quality ===
Sediment load from Batavia Kill, along with West Kill and East Kill, have been the principal contributors of sediment and turbidity in the Schoharie Reservoir. Due to this, the kill was selected by NYCDEP to have stream channel reconstruction performed in certain areas and to implement a stream management plan. In the kill are populations of Japanese knotweed, which has shallow route structures. The Japanese knotwood out competes plants with stronger roots, which also contribute to streambank erosion.

DEC rates the water quality of the Batavia Kill in three different sections. The upper section from the source to Maplecrest and the lower section from Windham to the mouth is rated as Class C, suitable for fishing and non-contact human recreation. The section from Maplecrest to Windham is rated as Class A, suitable for use as drinking water. The agency also adds a "(TS)" to the upper and sections of the middle, indicating that the stream's waters are ideal for trout spawning. DEC adds a "(T)" to the lower and sections of the middle, which means its suitable for trout populations. The kill's waters are pure enough to be part of the New York City water supply system; after draining into the Schoharie they are impounded at Schoharie Reservoir downstream, where they can be delivered through the Shandaken Tunnel to Esopus Creek at Shandaken. From there they go to Ashokan Reservoir, which supplies 10 percent of the city's water, and then, via the Catskill Aqueduct, to customers, without requiring filtration.

=== Flood control ===
Serious flooding occurred from Hurricane Connie in 1955 and Hurricane Donna in 1960 along the kill, which caused severe damage. After the 1960 flood, Greene County created the Greene County Soil & Water Conservation District, to allow access to federal flood protection funds. Then in July 1965, the USDA Soil Conservation Service, now known as the Natural Resources Conservation Service, published a watershed protection plan. The plan proposed that four flood control structures be built in the watershed. The first was constructed in 1967 and is located on Mitchell Hollow Creek 1.7 miles (2.7 km) upstream from the mouth. Another was built in 1970 and is located on the Lake Heloise outlet, approximately one mile north of its confluence with the Batavia. The CD Lane Park Dam was constructed in 1974 and is located approximately 3.5 miles (5.6 km) upstream of Hensonville. Each dam is made of an earth embankment, a low level outlet pipe, and an emergency grass spillway. All emergency spillways were active during Tropical Storm Irene.

In 1999, a 1,600 feet (490 m) section of the creek on the Maier Farm was reconstructed. Before the project the banks of the kill were eroding about 20 feet (6.1 m) per year. Also in 1999, a 3,600 feet (1,100 m) section of the creek behind the Brandywine restaurant in Ashland was restored, both just before Tropical Storm Floyd effected the watershed. Then in 2002, a 5,600 feet (1,700 m) section of the creek above C.D. Lane Park was restored. These projects included adding rock structures and planting native vegetation on the streambanks and floodplains to reduce erosion. Also leaves and branches from the vegetation cools the water by providing shade, which improves the habitat for wildlife.

The areas of greatest concern for flooding were the reach of the stream around the hamlets of Maplecrest, Hensonville, and Windham. Also the section between Hensonville and Maplecrest was high risk.

== Conservation and management ==
The first water quality protection program was the Watershed Agricultural Program (WAP), which was created by the NYCDEP in 1990. Originally it proposed that as much as 75 percent of the active farmland would be eliminated. This caused the New York State Soil & Water Conservation to educate the city on the benefits of farming. As a result, farmers improved management activities to improve water quality, rather than going out of production. Then in 1994, the Watershed Forestry Program (WFP) was established based on the success of the WAP. Since 1997, the WFP has worked along with the US Forest Service, Catskill Forest Association, SUNY-ESF and other agencies. The WFP has gained city, state and federal funds for programs to improve water quality. The WFP also provides resources for logger training and certification. Also the GCSWCD assisted the WFP in 2000, and the two agencies purchased a 20-foot-long (6.1 m) temporary bridge, which is available on a loan basis for logging operations at no cost.

In January 1997, the execution of the NYC Watershed Memorandum of Agreement (MOA) between different levels of government, non-profit organizations, and local entities provided the groundwork for a watershed protection program. The MOA included updates to watershed rules and regulations, an extensive land acquisition program, and development of programs to help local communities and landowners with water quality protection projects. The MOA also included resources to build the economic status of communities along the kill. The Catskill Watershed Corporation (CWC) was then formed, which carries out programs of the MOA. The CWC gives out grants to residents and communities in the watershed to help pay for storm water system replacements, sand and salt storage facility improvements, and wastewater treatment system improvements.
