= Parker Mountain =

Mountain in New York, United States

- Location within New York Location within the United States

Highest point
- Elevation: 2,831 feet (863 m)
- Coordinates: 42°13′22″N 74°08′23″W

Geography
- Location: Hunter, New York, U.S.
- Topo map: USGS Hunter

Parker Mountain is a mountain located in the Catskill Mountains of New York east-northeast of Hunter. Onteora Mountain is located west, Stoppel Point is located east, Black Dome is located north-northeast, Star Rock is located east-northeast, and Thomas Cole Mountain is located north of Parker Mountain.
