= Van Loan Hill =

Mountain in New York state, United States of America

- Location within New York Adirondack and Catskill Parks Location within the United States

Highest point
- Elevation: 2,526 feet (770 m)
- Coordinates: 42°16′08″N 74°12′01″W

Geography
- Location: SW of Maplecrest, New York, U.S.
- Parent range: Catskill Mountains
- Topo map: USGS Hensonville

Geology
- Rock age: Last Glacial Period
- Mountain type: drumlin

Van Loan Hill is a mountain in Greene County, New York. It is located in the Catskill Mountains southwest of Maplecrest. Round Hill is located west, Elm Ridge is located north-northeast, and East Jewett Range is located south of Van Loan Hill.

Van Loan Hill is a drumlin that was formed in the Last Glacial Period. Its name is possibly in honor of Walton Van Loan, a local guide book author and cartographer.

On National Trails Day in 1999, an adjacent 116 acres (47 ha) parcel of watershed land called Maplecrest Unit in the Town of Windham was opened for hiking by the New York City Department of Environmental Protection, allowing for unobstructed views. To view by car, the closest road to the north and east is County Route 40. To the south is Round Hills Road, and to the west past Round Hill is New York State Route 296. Batavia Kill runs along the northern slope, and the tributaries of East Kill lie south. The area was in the path of both Hurricane Irene and Tropical Storm Lee, and in 2012 the Maplecrest Unit underwent restoration work and stream stabilization.
