= New York State Route 296 =

State highway in Greene County, New York, US

New York State Route 296
- Map of Greene County in eastern New York with NY 296 highlighted in red

Route information
- Maintained by NYSDOT
- Length: 7.90 mi (12.71 km)
- Existed: 1930–present

Major junctions
- South end: NY 23A in Hunter
- North end: NY 23 in Windham

Location
- Country: United States
- State: New York
- Counties: Greene

Highway system
- New York Highways; Interstate; US; State; Reference; Parkways
← NY 295	→ NY 297

New York State Route 296 (NY 296) is a 7.90-mile (12.71 km) north–south state highway located entirely within both the Catskill Park and Greene County, New York, in the United States. It connects NY 23A in the village of Hunter with NY 23 near the Windham hamlet of Hensonville. The route follows a mountainous track between the two locations, climbing up from the Schoharie Creek valley before descending again into the Batavia Kill watershed. NY 296 was assigned as part of the 1930 renumbering of state highways in New York; however, the highway had been state-maintained since the early 1910s.

== Route description ==
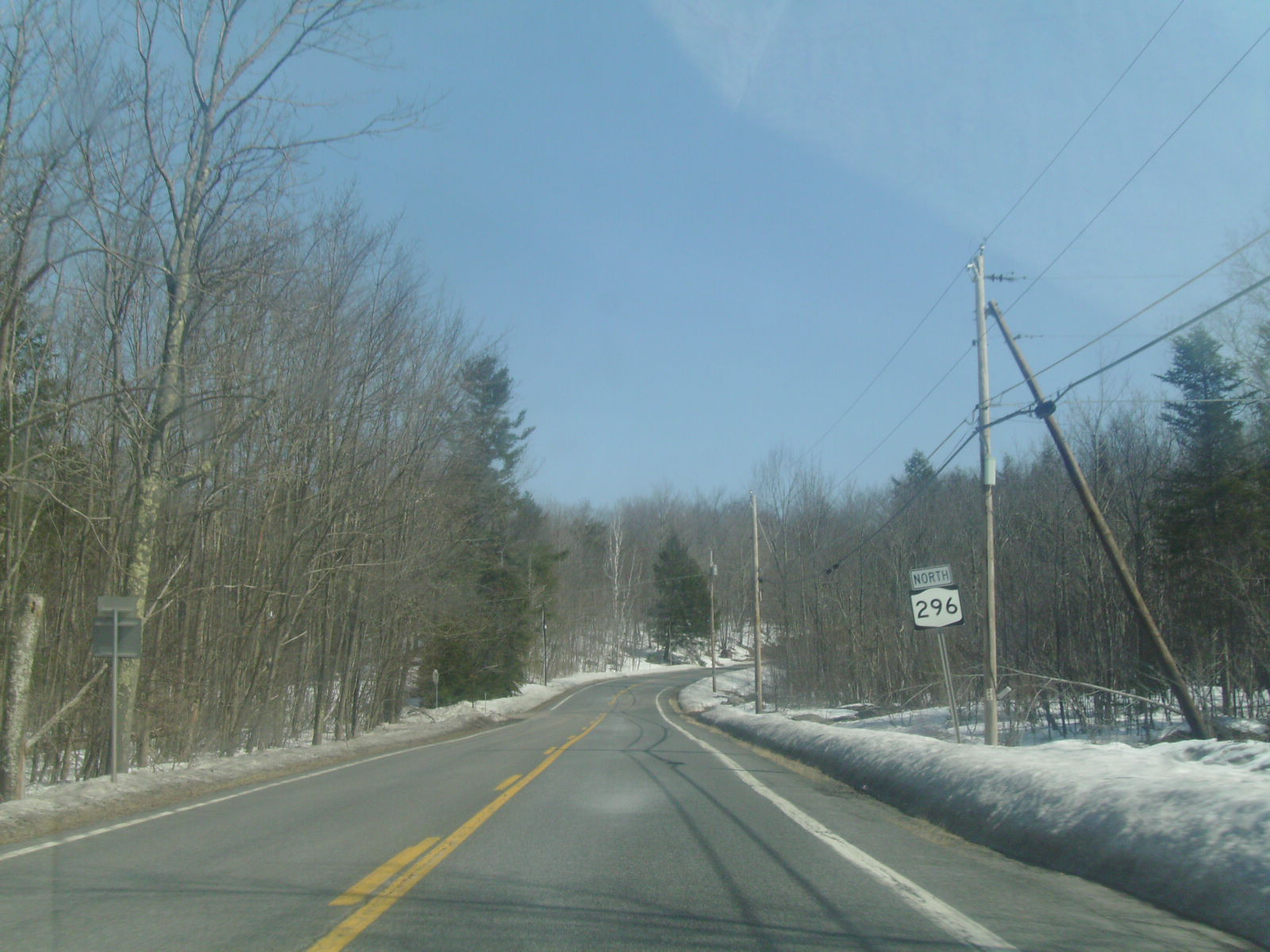
NY 296 heading north through Hunter on a winter morning

NY 296 begins at an intersection with NY 23A (Main Street) along the banks of Schoharie Creek just west of the village of Hunter in the town of Hunter. Located within the Catskill Forest Preserve, NY 296 passes the entrance to the former Hunter Mountain Airport, where views of Rusk Mountain are visible. Winding into the town of Jewett, NY 296 is a two-lane asphalt roadway running through the Catskills. Near the junction with Beaches Corners Road, the route turns northwest, paralleling the East Kill, before crossing the waterway a short distance later. Just after crossing the East Kill, NY 296 crosses Beaches Corners Road one more time before intersecting with County Route 23C (CR 23C), which proceeds east towards NY 23A and west towards the hamlet of Jewett.

NY 296 continues northeast after CR 23, passing a local church near the junction with Peck Road. The route proceeds due north after Peck Road, quickly entering a junction with CR 14 (Goshen Street), which merges into the state highway. NY 296 winds through the Catskills past Thomas Cole Mountain. After winding down the side of the mountain, NY 296 enters the hamlet of Hensonville, located adjacent to Batavia Kill, a tributary of Schoharie Creek. Here, the route intersects with the western terminus of CR 40 (Maple Crest Road). At this junction, NY 296 turns northwest on the CR 40 right-of-way, while CR 65 (Brooksburg Road) continues north towards NY 23.

Leaving Hensonville, NY 296 continues northwest along Batavia Kill, serving a line of homes on the fringe of the hamlet. Crossing into the town of Windham, the route intersects with CR 12 (South Street) before turning north and crossing Batavia Kill to reach its north end at a junction with NY 23 just east of downtown Windham.

== History ==
The origins of NY 296 date back to the early 1910s when the highway was improved by the state of New York over the course of two separate projects. On February 19, 1910, the state awarded a contract to rebuild 3.41 miles (5.49 km) of roads in Windham, including the northernmost 1.7 miles (2.7 km) of what is now NY 296. The reconstructed highways were added to the state highway system on January 5, 1911, as State Highway 797 (SH 797). The remainder of modern NY 296 was improved under a contract let on April 25, 1912, and accepted into the state highway system on December 19, 1913, as SH 998. Both state highway numbers are unsigned. NY 296 was assigned as part of the 1930 renumbering of state highways in New York to its current alignment.

== Major intersections ==
The entire route is in Greene County.

Location	mi	km	Destinations	Notes
Village of Hunter	0.00	0.00	NY 23A (Main Street) – Tannersville, Lexington	Southern terminus
Windham	7.90	12.71	NY 23 – Windham, Cairo	Northern terminus
1.000 mi = 1.609 km; 1.000 km = 0.621 mi
