= Round Hill (Greene County, New York) =

Mountain in New York, United States

- Location within New York Adirondack Park Location within the United States

Highest point
- Elevation: 2,589 feet (789 m)
- Coordinates: 42°16′15″N 74°12′50″W

Geography
- Location: WSW of Maplecrest, New York, U.S.
- Topo map: USGS Hensonville

Round Hill is a mountain in Greene County, New York. It is located in the Catskill Mountains west-southwest of Maplecrest. Van Loan Hill is located east, and East Jewett Range is located south of Round Hill.
