= Patterson Ridge =

Ridge in Greene County, New York

- Location within New York Location within the United States

Highest point
- Elevation: 2,520 ft (770 m)
- Coordinates: 42°17′22″N 74°22′40″W, 42°16′55″N 74°21′42″W

Geography
- Location: ESE of Prattsville, New York, U.S.
- Topo map: USGS Prattsville

Patterson Ridge is a ridge located in Greene County, New York east-southeast of Prattsville, New York. Bald Mountain is located along Patterson Ridge. It drains south into Schoharie Creek and north into Batavia Kill.
