= Bald Mountain (Greene County, New York) =

Mountain in New York, United States

- Location within New York Location within the United States

Highest point
- Elevation: 2,513 ft (766 m)
- Coordinates: 42°17′41″N 74°23′16″W

Geography
- Location: ESE of Prattsville, New York, U.S.
- Topo map: USGS Prattsville

Bald Mountain is a mountain located in Greene County, New York east-southeast of Prattsville, New York. Bald Mountain is located on Patterson Ridge. It drains south into Schoharie Creek and north into Batavia Kill.
