= Halsey Brook =

Location
- Country: United States
- State: New York

Physical characteristics
- Mouth: East Kill
  - location: East Jewett, United States
  - coordinates: 42°13′59″N 74°08′22″W
- Basin size: 1.35 mi^{2} (3.5 km^{2})

Halsey Brook converges with East Kill near East Jewett.
