= Elm Ridge (Greene County, New York) =

Mountain in New York, United States

- Location within New York Adirondack Park Location within the United States

Highest point
- Elevation: 2,333 feet (711 m)
- Coordinates: 42°18′01″N 74°11′17″W range_coordinates =

Geography
- Location: N of Maplecrest, New York, U.S.
- Topo map: USGS Hensonville

Elm Ridge is a mountain in Greene County, New York. It is located in the Catskill Mountains north of Maplecrest. Van Loan Hill is located south-southwest of Elm Ridge.
