= Manor Kill =

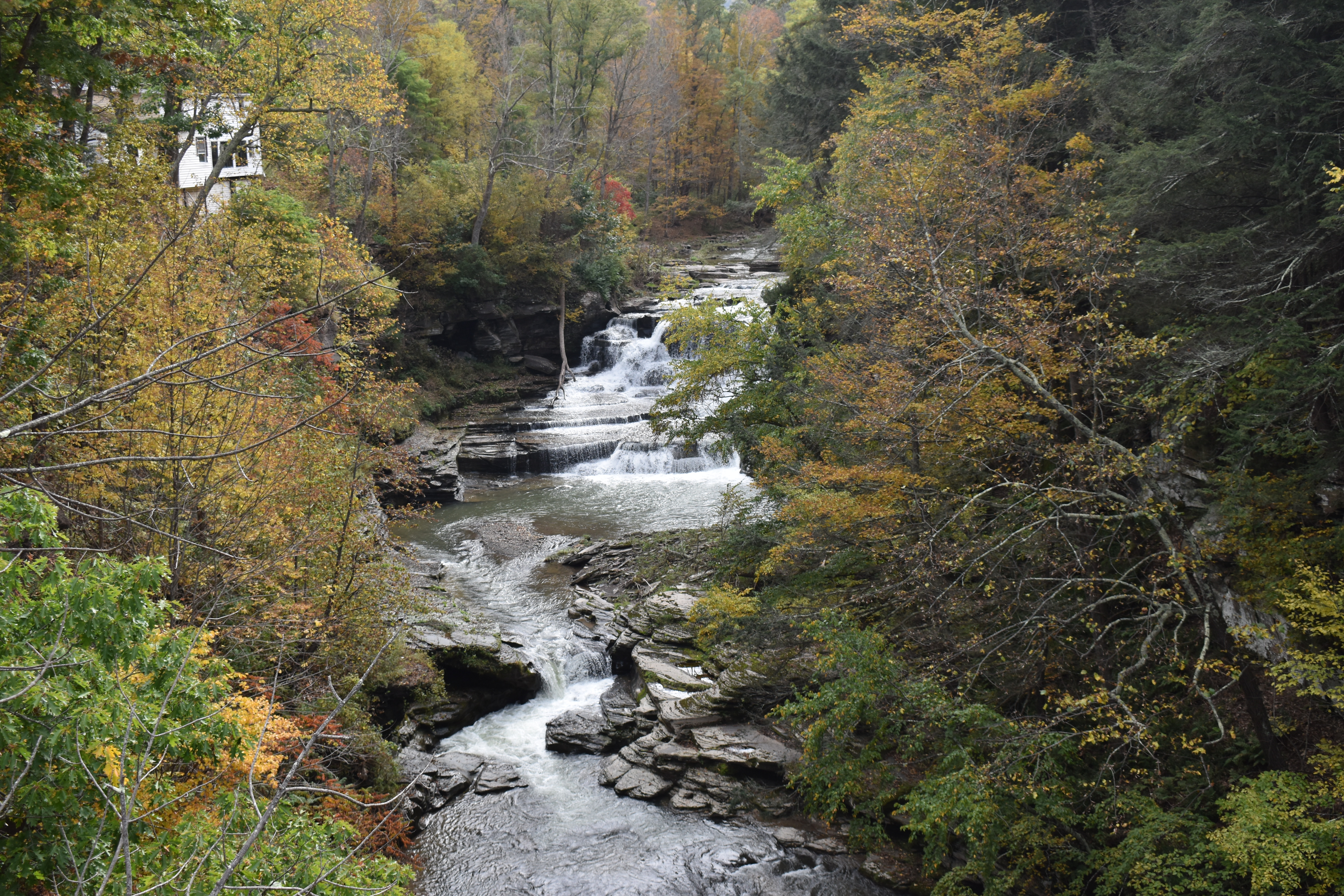
- Manor Kill Falls

- Location of mouth within New York Manor Kill (the United States)

Location
- Country: United States
- State: New York
- Region: Central New York
- County: Schoharie

Physical characteristics
- Source
  - location: Northeast of Manorkill
  - coordinates: 42°25′00″N 74°17′20″W
- Mouth: Schoharie Reservoir
  - location: Southeast of Gilboa
  - coordinates: 42°22′49″N 74°25′58″W
  - elevation: 343 feet (105 m)
- Basin size: 34.4 square miles (89 km^{2})

Basin features
- Progression: Manor Kill → Schoharie Reservoir → Schoharie Creek → Mohawk River → Hudson River → Upper New York Bay
- Tributaries
  - right: Bear Kill
- Waterfalls: Manor Kill Falls

Manor Kill is a river in Schoharie County in the state of New York. It begins northeast of Manorkill and flows westward before flowing into the Schoharie Reservoir southeast of Gilboa, New York. Manor Kill Falls is located on the creek where it passes under Prattsville Road (County Route 39). Since it drains into the Schoharie Reservoir, it is part of the New York City water supply system.

== Hydrology ==
Graph from West Conesville USGS stream gauge showing rise in discharge after Tropical Storm Irene

Manor Kill's watershed receives an average 36.8 inches (930 mm) of precipitation annually. Most of it is concentrated in seasonal events such as summer thunderstorms, remnants of hurricanes later in the year or rain-on-snow events in springtime. This pattern of precipitation, combined with the Manor Kill watershed's slopes and low drainage density, results in flashiness, as the stream and its tributaries rise and fall quickly in response to storm events. The forests that cover much of the watershed tend to mitigate this somewhat.

The United States Geological Survey (USGS) maintains one stream gauge along Manor Kill. The station, in service since July 1986, is located 1.2 miles (1.9 km) upstream from the mouth, .5 miles (0.80 km) east of West Conesville, had a maximum discharge of 6,590 cubic feet (187 m^{3}) per second on August 28, 2011, as Hurricane Irene passed through the area. It had a minimum discharge of 1 cubic foot (0.028 m^{3}) per second on August 28–31, 1993, September 1–2, 1993 and September 6–8, 1995.

== History ==
The village of Conesville was previously known as "Stone Bridge" because of the great arched stone bridge that stood where the present bridge crosses the Bearkill. This bridge was washed away in a flood of 1874.
