= Roaring Brook (East Kill tributary) =

Location
- Country: United States
- State: New York

Physical characteristics
- Mouth: East Kill
  - location: Jewett Center, New York, United States
  - coordinates: 42°15′16″N 74°17′34″W
- Basin size: 2.05 mi^{2} (5.3 km^{2})

Roaring Brook is a river that converges with East Kill near Jewett Center, New York.
