= Megan W. Lang =

American geospatial analyst and wetland scientist

Megan Lang is an American geospatial analyst and wetland scientist currently working as Chief Scientist for the U.S. Fish and Wildlife Service National Wetlands Inventory Program, as well as Project Lead for the Wetlands Status and Trends study. She is known for her work in LiDAR (Light Detection and Ranging) and SAR (Synthetic Aperture Radar) being used to map and study isolated and obscured wetland systems.

== Education ==
Lang began her career as an undergraduate at the College of Charleston in South Carolina in 1996. During that time she researched ecological succession in abandoned rice fields with an emphasis on how human activities impact the natural recovery of affected wetlands.

She completed her doctoral education at the University of Maryland in Remote Sensing and Geospatial Analysis. Her PhD research focused on the effects that climate change has on ecological dynamics within wetlands, with an emphasis on spatial tools being primarily used to track how wetlands change over time.

== Career ==
Before having joined the USFWS, Lang was a research associate professor at the Department of Geographical Sciences at the University of Maryland. She also contributed to the USDA as a lead researcher for the Mid-Atlantic Regional Wetland Conservation Effects Assessment Project (CEAP). During her time in this role she investigated how specific conservation practices could minimize the impact that agriculture has on wetlands in coastal environments, specifically in New Jersey, Delaware, Virginia, Maryland and North Carolina. Lang also worked as the Chief Scientist for the National Wetlands Inventory (NWI).

Her work assisted in tracking wetland changes across the United States and accelerated the development of more advanced spatial mapping technologies for wetland data collection, also in support of the conservation efforts of Ducks Unlimited. Lang's work helps connect the scientific remote-sensing field of wetland science to federal environmental policy like the North American Wetlands Conservation Act. She has published over 40 scientific articles, many concerning wetlands in the United States, is an associate editor for the journal Wetlands.

== Scientific contributions ==
=== Remote sensing innovation ===
Lang was a key force in the use of LiDAR intensity data being used to detect water underneath tree cover. More traditional LiDAR methods interpret elevation while Lang's techniques allow for differentiation between saturated soils and dry ones beneath the canopy. This allows for far more accurate data collection in forested wetlands that would otherwise be overlooked or too obscured by vegetation to yield reliable interpretations.

=== Geographically Isolated Wetlands ===
A keystone in her research is specific wetlands that do not have any hydrologic connection to a body of water, or "Geographically Isolated Wetlands" (GIWs). Lang's research touches on this heavily as it provides substantial empirical evidence that even seemingly completely isolated wetland systems have a large impact to downstream waters by way of a groundwater connection, sometimes referred to in legislature as a "significant nexus". Her research suggests that these kinds of wetlands are still vital to flood mitigation and ecological resilience.

=== Wetlands trends ===
Under Lang, the USFWS published the Status and Trends of Wetlands in the Conterminous United States 2009 to 2019 report. In this report it was stated that the national wetland loss rates in the United States increased by 50 percent compared to the previous decade, with the greatest losses happening in marshes and swamps, where tree cover is prevalent and makes accurate analysis more difficult.
