= Burnt Knob (New York) =

Mountain in New York, United States

- Location within New York Location within the United States

Highest point
- Elevation: 3,189 feet (972 m)
- Coordinates: 42°18′07″N 74°07′08″W

Geography
- Location: SE of South Durham, New York, U.S.
- Topo map: USGS Freehold

Burnt Knob is a mountain in Greene County, New York, United States. It is located in the Catskill Mountains southeast of South Durham. Acra Point is located east-southeast, and Blackhead is located south-southeast of Burnt Knob.
