= Cave Mountain (New York) =

Mountain in New York, United States

- Location within New York Location within the United States

Highest point
- Elevation: 3,104 ft (946 m)
- Coordinates: 42°17′09″N 74°14′47″W, 42°17′04″N 74°15′53″W

Geography
- Location: S of Windham, New York, U.S.
- Topo map: USGS Hensonville

Cave Mountain is a mountain located in Greene County, New York south of Windham, New York. Cave Mountain drains south into East Kill and north into Batavia Kill. Cave Mountain is part of the Shawangunk Ridge (also known as The Gunks), which is a long mountain range that runs through eastern New York.
