= Gilboa-Conesville Central School =

Location
- 132 Wyckoff Rd; Gilboa, New York 12076; United States
- Coordinates: 42°23′32″N 74°26′28″W

Information
- Type: Public
- Motto: "Best school by a dam site"
- Established: 1929
- School district: Gilboa-Conesville Central School District
- NCES District ID: 3612120
- Superintendent: Jack Etter
- NCES School ID: 361212000970
- Principal: Thomas Cervolo
- Teaching staff: 34.00 (on an FTE basis)
- Grades: PK-12
- Enrollment: 249 (2024-2025)
- Student to teacher ratio: 7.32
- Campus: Rural: Remote
- Colors: Purple and Gold
- Mascot: Wildcats
- Nickname: GCCS
- Yearbook: Reflector
- Website: www.gilboa-conesville.k12.ny.us

The Gilboa-Conesville Central School District is a small, rural school located in the Northern Catskill Mountains. There are about 375 students in grades K–12 housed in one building in Gilboa, Schoharie County New York.

There are no villages nor towns within the school district. The town of Prattsville has the only village atmosphere in the district. Because no students live within walking distance of the school, almost all take the school bus to school.
