= Blackhead Mountains =

Mountain range in the United States

Coordinates: 42.27°N 74.13°W

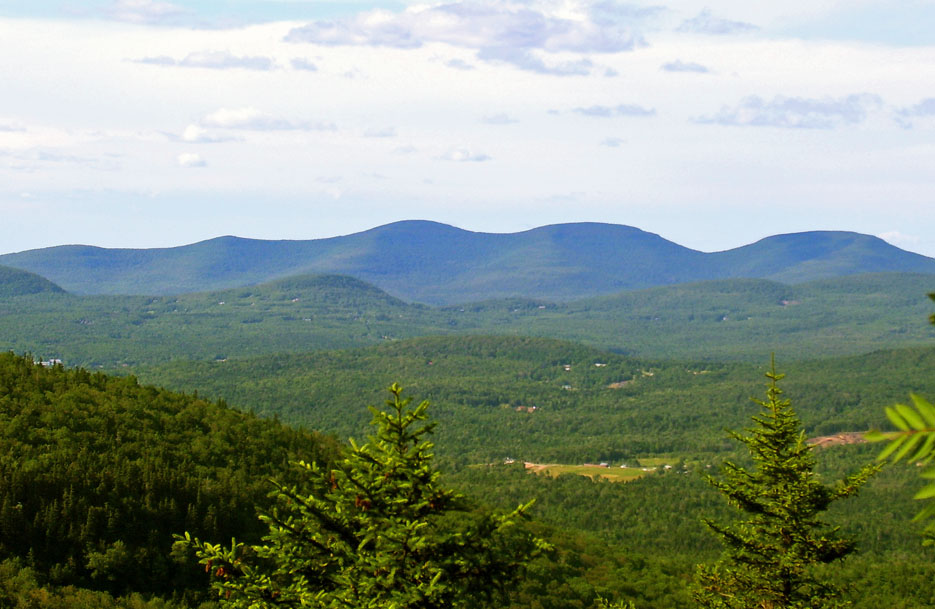
The Blackhead range seen from the south: Caudal, Camel's Hump, Thomas Cole Mountain, Black Dome and Blackhead Mountain, left to right.

The Blackhead Mountains range is located near the northern end of the Catskill Mountains, in Greene County, New York, United States, where it divides the towns of Windham and Jewett. The three named peaks in the range – Thomas Cole Mountain (3,940 feet; 1,201 m), Black Dome (3,980 feet; 1,213 m), and Blackhead Mountain (also in the 3,940-foot range) – are the fourth-, third-, and fifth-highest peaks in the Catskills, respectively. The gap between Thomas Cole and Black Dome is, at 3,700 feet, the highest in the Catskills.

To the west of Thomas Cole are two lesser, officially unnamed summits known locally as Camel's Hump (3,520 feet; 1,073 m) and Caudal (3,320 feet; 1,012 m). All except Blackhead can be climbed via the popular Black Dome Range Trail; a short spur from that trail leads to the Escarpment Trail atop Blackhead.

The range's distinctive rooster-comb profile is a visual signature of the Catskills. It can be easily seen from as far north as Albany and its suburbs, if there are views to the south to the range.

Van Loan Hill is located west of the Blackhead Mountains.
