= Onteora Mountain =

Mountain in New York, United States

- Location within New York Location within the United States

Highest point
- Elevation: 3,232 feet (985 m)
- Coordinates: 42°13′20″N 74°10′05″W

Geography
- Location: Hunter, New York, U.S.
- Topo map: USGS Hunter

Onteora Mountain is a mountain located in the Catskill Mountains of New York east-northeast of Hunter. Parker Mountain is located east, and East Jewett Range is located west-northwest of Onteora Mountain.
