= Black Dome =

Black Dome may refer to mountains within North America.:

== Canada ==
- Black Dome Mountain, British Columbia

== United States ==
Name	USGS link	State	County	USGS map	Coordinates	Elevation	
Black Dome		California	Alpine	Ebbetts Pass	38°31′53″N 119°50′43″W	9,055 ft	2,760 m
Big Black Dome		Idaho	Custer	Big Black Dome	43°49′22″N 113°58′47″W	11,325 ft	3,452 m
Black Dome		New York	Greene	Freehold	42°16′12″N 074°07′21″W	3,973 ft	1,211 m
Black Dome		Alaska	Nome (CA)	Bendeleben C-6	65°37′36″N 164°43′41″W	1,227 ft	374 m
Blackdome Peak		Idaho	Shoshone	Little Goat Mountains	46°58′59″N 115°48′58″W	6,378 ft	1,944 m
Mount Mitchell		North Carolina	Yancey	Mount Mitchell	35°45′53″N 082°15′54″W	6,683 ft	2,037 m
Black Dome		Arizona	Yuma	Engesser Pass	33°08′44″N 113°48′36″W	2,100 ft	640 m
