= Conesville, New York =

- Town
- Location in Schoharie County and the state of New York.
- Coordinates: 42°24′35″N 74°20′19″W
- Country: United States
- State: New York
- County: Schoharie

Area
  - Total: 39.87 sq mi (103.26 km^{2})
  - Land: 39.47 sq mi (102.22 km^{2})
  - Water: 0.41 sq mi (1.05 km^{2})
- Elevation: 1,457 ft (444 m)

Population (2020)
  - Total: 687
  - Density: 17.4/sq mi (6.72/km^{2})
- Time zone: UTC-5 (Eastern (EST))
  - Summer (DST): UTC-4 (EDT)
- FIPS code: 36-17651
- GNIS feature ID: 0978859

Conesville is a town in Schoharie County, New York, United States. The population was 687 at the 2020 census. The town is named after Jonathan Cone, an early resident.

The Town of Conesville is in the southeastern corner of the county and is approximately 40 miles (64 km) southwest of Albany.

== History ==
Conesville was first settled circa 1764 on a patent issued in 1754.

The town was formed in 1836 from the Town of Durham (now in Greene County) and the Town of Broome.

== Geography ==
According to the United States Census Bureau, the town has a total area of 39.9 square miles (103 km^{2}), of which 39.5 square miles (102 km^{2}) is land and 0.4 square miles (1.0 km^{2}) (1.00%) is water.

The southern town line is the border of Greene County. Part of the eastern town line borders Greene County; the northern section borders Albany County.

The Manor Kill is a stream, fed by the Bear Kill, flowing westward into the Schoharie Reservoir near West Conesville.

New York State Route 990V is an east–west highway running from the community of Conesville to the western town line at the Schoharie Reservoir.

== Demographics ==
Historical population
Census	Pop.	Note	%±
1840	1,621		—
1850	1,582		−2.4%
1860	1,478		−6.6%
1870	1,314		−11.1%
1880	1,127		−14.2%
1890	929		−17.6%
1900	793		−14.6%
1910	708		−10.7%
1920	652		−7.9%
1930	569		−12.7%
1940	673		18.3%
1950	626		−7.0%
1960	593		−5.3%
1970	489		−17.5%
1980	681		39.3%
1990	684		0.4%
2000	726		6.1%
2010	734		1.1%
2020	687		−6.4%
U.S. Decennial Census 2020

== 2000 ==
As of the census of 2000, there were 726 people, 304 households, and 214 families residing in the town. The population density was 18.4 inhabitants per square mile (7.1/km^{2}). There were 777 housing units at an average density of 19.7 per square mile (7.6/km^{2}). The racial makeup of the town was 97.38% White, 0.28% African American, 0.28% from other races, and 2.07% from two or more races. Hispanic or Latino of any race were 1.79% of the population.

There were 304 households, out of which 26.0% had children under the age of 18 living with them, 57.6% were married couples living together, 7.2% had a female householder with no husband present, and 29.3% were non-families. 26.0% of all households were made up of individuals, and 13.2% had someone living alone who was 65 years of age or older. The average household size was 2.39 and the average family size was 2.85.

In the town, the population was spread out, with 22.3% under the age of 18, 5.9% from 18 to 24, 24.4% from 25 to 44, 28.5% from 45 to 64, and 18.9% who were 65 years of age or older. The median age was 44 years. For every 100 females, there were 98.9 males. For every 100 females age 18 and over, there were 101.4 males.

The median income for a household in the town was $33,417, and the median income for a family was $37,344. Males had a median income of $31,250 versus $21,964 for females. The per capita income for the town was $16,236. About 5.7% of families and 7.4% of the population were below the poverty line, including 12.4% of those under age 18 and none of those age 65 or over.

== Communities and locations in Conesville ==
- Conesville – The hamlet of Conesville is on the Manor Kill at the junction of County Roads 3 and 18 and NY-990V.
- Manor Kill – A stream running through the town to the Schoharie Reservoir.
- Manorkill – A hamlet in the eastern part of the town on County Road 3 and the Manor Kill.
- Schoharie Reservoir – a reservoir located at the western town line, constructed in 1926.
- West Conesville – A hamlet in the western part of the town on State Route 990v near the Schoharie Reservoir.
