= Star Rock (New York) =

Mountain in New York, United States

- Location within New York Adirondack Park Location within the United States

Highest point
- Elevation: 2,520 feet (770 m)
- Coordinates: 42°13′32″N 74°07′50″W

Geography
- Location: N of Tannersville, New York, U.S.
- Topo map: USGS Hunter

Star Rock is a pillar in Greene County, New York. It is located in the Catskill Mountains north of Tannersville. Parker Mountain is located west-southwest of Star Rock.
