= East Jewett Range =

Mountain in New York, United States

- Location within New York Adirondack Park Location within the United States

Highest point
- Elevation: 2,940 feet (900 m)
- Coordinates: 42°14′07″N 74°12′16″W

Geography
- Location: WSW of Maplecrest, New York, U.S.
- Topo map: USGS Hunter

East Jewett Range is a mountain in Greene County, New York. It is located in the Catskill Mountains west-southwest of Maplecrest. Van Loan Hill is located north, and Onteora Mountain is located east-southeast of East Jewett Range.
