= Forks in the Road Schoolhouse =

- U.S. National Register of Historic Places
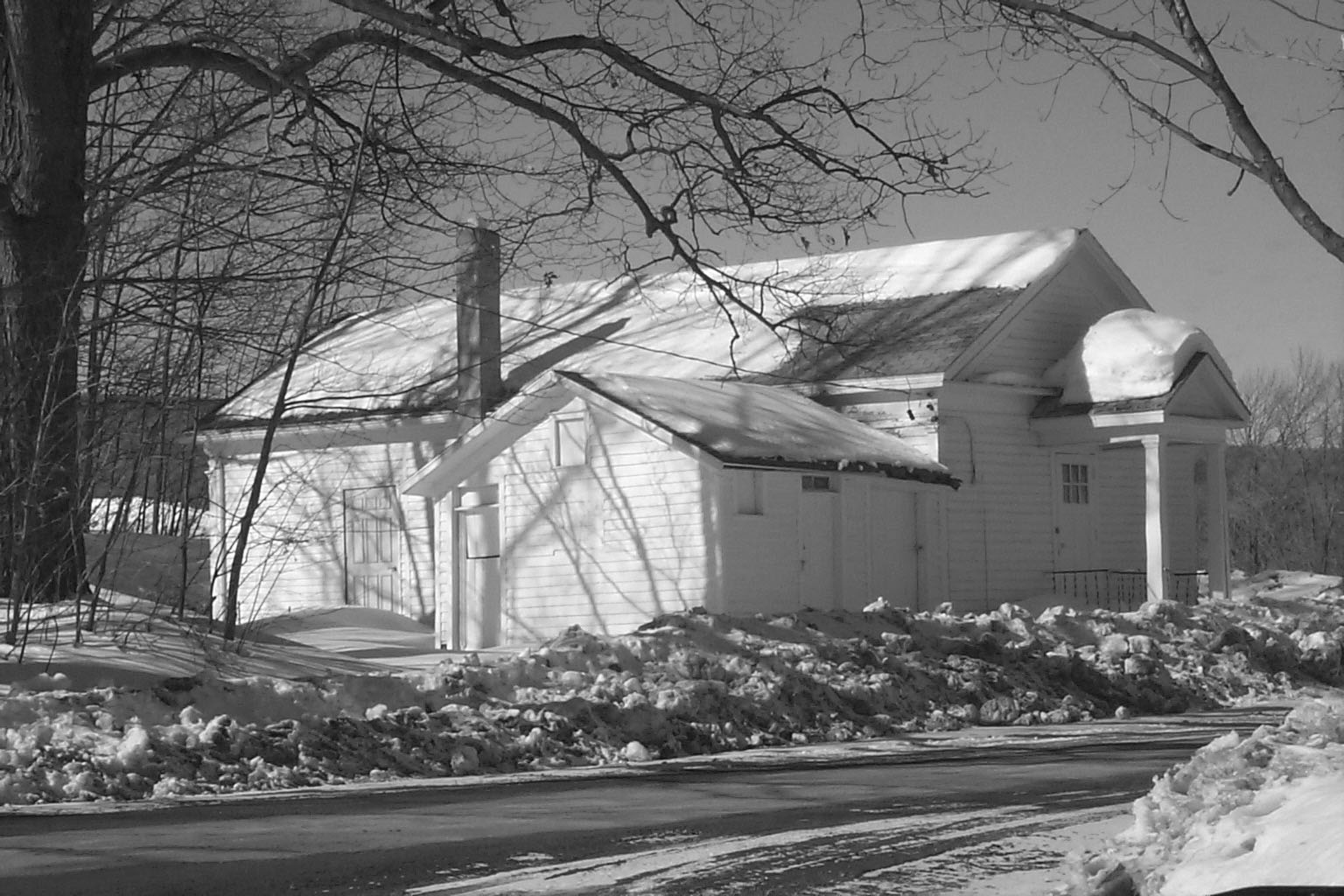

- Location within New York Location within the United States
- Location: 115 Lumber Rd. South Gilboa, New York
- Coordinates: 42°24′43″N 74°33′48″W
- Area: less than one acre
- Built: 1849
- Architectural style: Greek Revival
- NRHP reference No.: 05000665
- Added to NRHP: July 6, 2005

Forks in the Road Schoolhouse is a historic one-room school building located at South Gilboa in Schoharie County, New York. It is a one-story, rectangular, gable roofed, timber-framed building built in 1849. It operated as a school into the 1930s. Also on the property is a privy.

It was listed on the National Register of Historic Places in 2005.
