= Stoppel Point =

Mountain in New York, United States

- Location within New York Location within the United States

Highest point
- Elevation: 3,422 ft (1,043 m)
- Coordinates: 42°13′30″N 74°03′54″W

Geography
- Location: NE of Haines Falls, New York, U.S.
- Topo map: USGS Kaaterskill Clove

Stoppel Point is a mountain located in Greene County, New York northeast of Haines Falls, New York. Located to the southeast is North Mountain. Stoppel Point drains east into Winter Clove, north into Countryman Kill and East Kill, and the east side is the source of Kaaterskill Creek.

On May 26, 1983, a pilot with a revoked student certificate crashed a Piper-28-140 into the mountain at about 3,400 feet (1,000 m) in bad weather . The remains of his airplane can still be found.
