= East Jewett, New York =

- Hamlet
- Location within New York Location within the United States
- Coordinates: 42°14′06″N 74°08′44″W
- Country: United States
- State: New York
- County: Greene
- Elevation: 1,965 ft (599 m)
- Time zone: UTC-5 (Eastern (EST))
  - Summer (DST): UTC-4 (EDT)
- ZIP code: 12424
- Area codes: 518 & 838
- GNIS feature ID: 949141

East Jewett is a hamlet in Greene County, New York, United States. The community is 2.8 miles (4.5 km) north of Tannersville. East Jewett had a post office from January 31, 1829, until early 2000; it still has its own ZIP code, 12424.

== Climate ==
Climate data for East Jewett, New York, 1991–2020 normals, extremes 1985-2020: 1991ft (607m)
Month	Jan	Feb	Mar	Apr	May	Jun	Jul	Aug	Sep	Oct	Nov	Dec	Year
Record high °F (°C)	64 (18)	75 (24)	83 (28)	89 (32)	90 (32)	91 (33)	94 (34)	95 (35)	94 (34)	83 (28)	75 (24)	68 (20)	95 (35)
Mean maximum °F (°C)	55 (13)	55 (13)	64 (18)	76 (24)	84 (29)	86 (30)	88 (31)	86 (30)	84 (29)	77 (25)	68 (20)	56 (13)	90 (32)
Mean daily maximum °F (°C)	30.6 (−0.8)	33.1 (0.6)	40.2 (4.6)	52.9 (11.6)	64.8 (18.2)	73.0 (22.8)	77.2 (25.1)	75.6 (24.2)	68.9 (20.5)	57.3 (14.1)	45.6 (7.6)	35.0 (1.7)	54.5 (12.5)
Daily mean °F (°C)	20.9 (−6.2)	22.4 (−5.3)	29.4 (−1.4)	41.3 (5.2)	52.6 (11.4)	61.1 (16.2)	65.3 (18.5)	63.6 (17.6)	56.9 (13.8)	46.4 (8.0)	36.2 (2.3)	26.6 (−3.0)	43.6 (6.4)
Mean daily minimum °F (°C)	11.2 (−11.6)	11.8 (−11.2)	18.5 (−7.5)	29.7 (−1.3)	40.3 (4.6)	49.2 (9.6)	53.5 (11.9)	51.6 (10.9)	44.9 (7.2)	35.4 (1.9)	26.8 (−2.9)	18.2 (−7.7)	32.6 (0.3)
Mean minimum °F (°C)	−10 (−23)	−9 (−23)	−3 (−19)	16 (−9)	26 (−3)	34 (1)	42 (6)	39 (4)	29 (−2)	22 (−6)	10 (−12)	−2 (−19)	−14 (−26)
Record low °F (°C)	−27 (−33)	−24 (−31)	−19 (−28)	2 (−17)	21 (−6)	28 (−2)	35 (2)	32 (0)	16 (−9)	16 (−9)	−11 (−24)	−23 (−31)	−27 (−33)
Average precipitation inches (mm)	4.41 (112)	3.10 (79)	4.83 (123)	4.84 (123)	4.00 (102)	4.60 (117)	4.60 (117)	5.06 (129)	5.27 (134)	6.04 (153)	4.76 (121)	4.54 (115)	56.05 (1,425)
Average snowfall inches (cm)	20.90 (53.1)	18.40 (46.7)	18.40 (46.7)	6.30 (16.0)	0.20 (0.51)	0.00 (0.00)	0.00 (0.00)	0.00 (0.00)	0.00 (0.00)	2.10 (5.3)	6.10 (15.5)	22.10 (56.1)	94.5 (239.91)
Source 1: NOAA
Source 2: XMACIS (temp records & monthly max/mins)
