= Acra Point =

Mountain in New York, United States

- Location within New York Location within the United States

Highest point
- Elevation: 3,110 feet (950 m)
- Coordinates: 42°17′47″N 74°05′59″W

Geography
- Location: S of South Durham, New York, U.S.
- Topo map: USGS Freehold

Acra Point is a mountain in Greene County, New York. It is located in the Catskill Mountains south of South Durham. Burnt Knob is located west-northwest, and Blackhead is located south of Acra Point.
