= Shandaken Tunnel =

Aqueduct in New York

Coordinates: 42.11528°N 74.363603°W

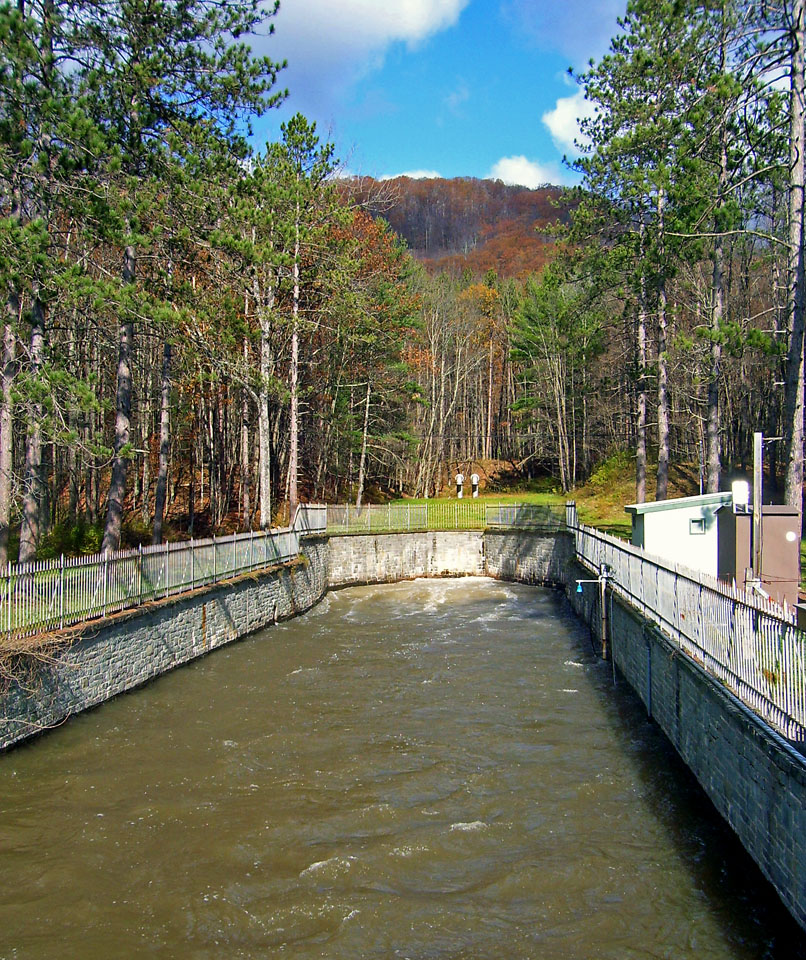
The south outlet of the Shandaken Tunnel, just above Esopus Creek

The Shandaken Tunnel is an aqueduct in Eastern New York State, part of the New York City water supply system. It was constructed between 1916 and 1924. The tunnel starts in Gilboa, New York at the Schoharie Reservoir, which is in the counties of Schoharie, Delaware, and Greene. The water flows south towards the Esopus Creek in Ulster County. It finally empties into a man-made pool in Allaben, New York, within the Town of Shandaken, and enters Esopus Creek there.

The tunnel is over 18 miles (29 km) in length, and carries water through Greene County and Ulster County. Water flows through the tunnel by gravity; it slopes at a rate of 4.4 feet per mile (83 cm/km). It is 11.5 feet (3.5 m) high, and 10.2 feet (3.1 m) wide. There are seven shafts along the tunnel, serving to aerate the water and provide an outlet for dissolved impurities to escape as gasses.
