= Windham (CDP), New York =

Windham, New York
- Census-designated place
- Location within New York Location within the United States
- Coordinates: 42°18′42″N 74°14′50″W
- Country: United States
- State: New York
- County: Greene
- Town: Windham

Area
  - Total: 2.30 sq mi (5.96 km^{2})
  - Land: 2.30 sq mi (5.96 km^{2})
  - Water: 0 sq mi (0.00 km^{2})
- Elevation: 1,516 ft (462 m)

Population (2020)
  - Total: 371
  - Density: 161.2/sq mi (62.25/km^{2})
- Time zone: UTC-5 (Eastern (EST))
  - Summer (DST): UTC-4 (EDT)
- ZIP code: 12496
- Area code: 518
- FIPS code: 36-82469
- GNIS feature ID: 0971463
- Website: www.townofwindhamny.com

Windham is a hamlet and census-designated place (CDP) in the town of Windham, Greene County, New York, United States. The population of the CDP was 371 at the 2020 census, out of a total of 1,708 people in the town.

The community of Windham is in the western part of the town, on Route 23. It was formerly known by several other names, including "Batavia", "Osbornville", and "Windham Center".

== Geography ==
Windham is located at 42°18′41″N 74°14′49″W (42.311591, -74.247116), in the valley of the Batavia Kill, a westward-flowing tributary of Schoharie Creek and part of the Mohawk River watershed. The hamlet is at the northern boundary of the Catskill Park.

According to the United States Census Bureau, the Windham CDP has a total area of 1.9 square miles (4.9 km^{2}), all land.

== Demographics ==
Historical population
Census	Pop.	Note	%±
2000	359		—
2010	367		2.2%
2020	371		1.1%
U.S. Decennial Census

As of the census of 2000, there were 359 people, 172 households, and 97 families residing in the CDP. The population density was 191.4 inhabitants per square mile (73.9/km^{2}). There were 422 housing units at an average density of 225.0 per square mile (86.9/km^{2}). The racial makeup of the CDP was 98.61% White and 1.39% Native American. Hispanic or Latino of any race were 1.11% of the population.

There were 172 households, out of which 22.7% had children under the age of 18 living with them, 44.8% were married couples living together, 8.1% had a female householder with no husband present, and 43.6% were non-families. 41.3% of all households were made up of individuals, and 19.2% had someone living alone who was 65 years of age or older. The average household size was 2.09 and the average family size was 2.81.

In the CDP, the population was spread out, with 19.5% under the age of 18, 4.7% from 18 to 24, 23.4% from 25 to 44, 24.0% from 45 to 64, and 28.4% who were 65 years of age or older. The median age was 47 years. For every 100 females, there were 100.6 males. For every 100 females age 18 and over, there were 102.1 males.

The median income for a household in the CDP was $32,083, and the median income for a family was $44,250. Males had a median income of $35,625 versus $40,313 for females. The per capita income for the CDP was $23,320. About 6.1% of families and 10.5% of the population were below the poverty line, including 11.1% of those under age 18 and 13.6% of those age 65 or over.
