= Gilboa, New York =

- Town
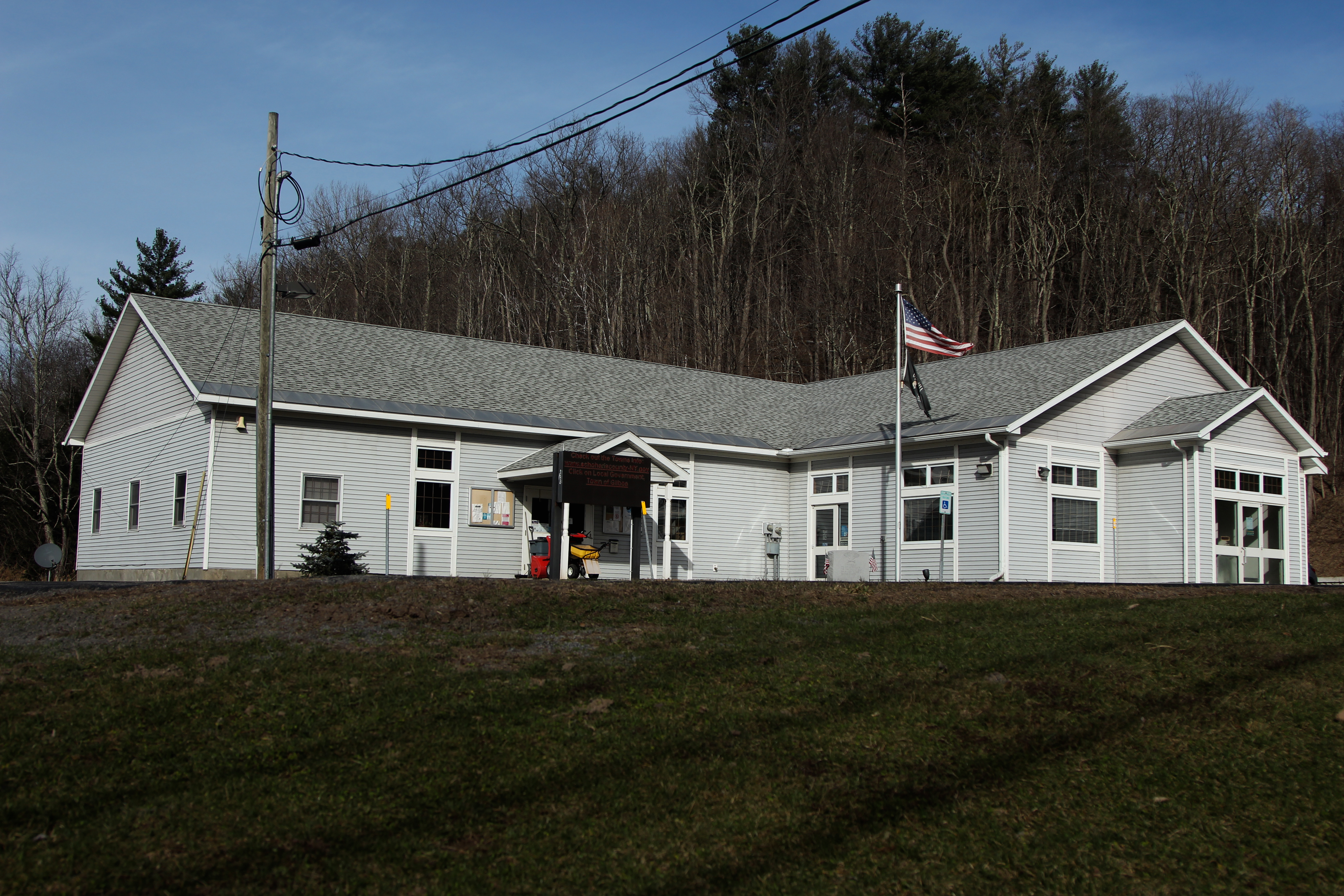
- Gilboa Town Hall

- Location in Schoharie County and the state of New York.
- Coordinates: 42°25′45″N 74°28′3″W
- Country: United States
- State: New York
- County: Schoharie

Area
  - Total: 59.38 sq mi (153.80 km^{2})
  - Land: 57.81 sq mi (149.72 km^{2})
  - Water: 1.58 sq mi (4.08 km^{2})
- Elevation: 912 ft (278 m)

Population (2020)
  - Total: 1,111
- Time zone: UTC-5 (Eastern (EST))
  - Summer (DST): UTC-4 (EDT)
- ZIP code: 12076
- Area code: 607
- FIPS code: 36-28981
- GNIS feature ID: 0979001

Gilboa is a town in Schoharie County, New York, United States. The population was 1,111 at the 2020 census.

The Town of Gilboa is in the southern part of the county and is southwest of Albany.

== History ==
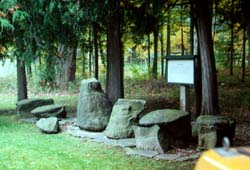
The Gilboa Fossils from the Wattieza tree located in Gilboa, New York discovered in 1920.

The town was first settled around 1760.

The Town of Gilboa was formed in 1848 from regions taken from the Towns of Blenheim and Broome. The name "Gilboa" is from Mount Gilboa, a biblical site in Israel, where King Saul's sons were killed by the Philistines, and Saul killed himself (1 Samuel 31:4)

A cotton mill in the community of Gilboa was a major contributor to the early economy of the town, but it was destroyed by a flood in 1869.

In 1926, the Schoharie Creek was dammed to form the Schoharie Reservoir. The original settlement of Gilboa was razed and flooded as part of this project. A new settlement was established north of the reservoir.

== Fossil Forest ==
In 1870, workers blasting a site for a stone quarry found fossilized remains of tree stumps. In 2004, the tops and fronds of the trees were discovered and, in 2007, the fern-like trees, named Wattieza, were pronounced the oldest known trees on earth.

== Geography ==
According to the United States Census Bureau, the town has a total area of 59.3 square miles (154 km^{2}), of which 57.8 square miles (150 km^{2}) is land and 1.6 square miles (4.1 km^{2}) of it (2.63%) is water.

The southern town line forms a border with Delaware County and Greene County.

The Schoharie Creek flows northward through the town.

New York State Route 30 is a north-south highway in Gilboa. New York State Route 23 cuts through the southwestern corner of the town. New York State Route 990V is a highway running eastward from NY-30 in the southeastern part of Gilboa.

== Demographics ==
Historical population
Census	Pop.	Note	%±
1850	3,024		—
1860	2,541		−16.0%
1870	2,227		−12.4%
1880	2,040		−8.4%
1890	1,718		−15.8%
1900	1,448		−15.7%
1910	1,467		1.3%
1920	1,541		5.0%
1930	978		−36.5%
1940	1,061		8.5%
1950	943		−11.1%
1960	782		−17.1%
1970	854		9.2%
1980	1,078		26.2%
1990	1,207		12.0%
2000	1,215		0.7%
2010	1,307		7.6%
2020	1,111		−15.0%
U.S. Decennial Census 2020

As of the census of 2000, there were 1,215 persons, 478 households, and 355 families residing in the town. The population density was 21.0 inhabitants per square mile (8.1/km^{2}). There were 992 housing units at an average density of 17.2 per square mile (6.6/km^{2}). The racial makeup of the town was 95.80% White, 0.91% African American, 0.25% Native American, 0.82% Asian, 1.23% from other races, and 0.99% from two or more races. Hispanic or Latino of any race were 1.98% of the population.

There were 478 households, out of which 31.0% had children under the age of 18 living with them, 60.7% were married couples living together, 9.0% had a female householder with no husband present, and 25.7% were non-families. 20.3% of all households were made up of individuals, and 9.8% had someone living alone who was 65 years of age or older. The average household size was 2.54 and the average family size was 2.92.

In the town, the population was spread out, with 23.2% under the age of 18, 5.6% from 18 to 24, 24.8% from 25 to 44, 29.9% from 45 to 64, and 16.5% who were 65 years of age or older. The median age was 43 years. For every 100 females, there were 94.7 males. For every 100 females age 18 and over, there were 102.8 males.

The median income for a household in the town was $35,156, and the median income for a family was $38,214. Males had a median income of $31,635 versus $25,278 for females. The per capita income for the town was $18,561. About 9.6% of families and 11.9% of the population were below the poverty line, including 11.4% of those under age 18 and 7.4% of those age 65 or over.

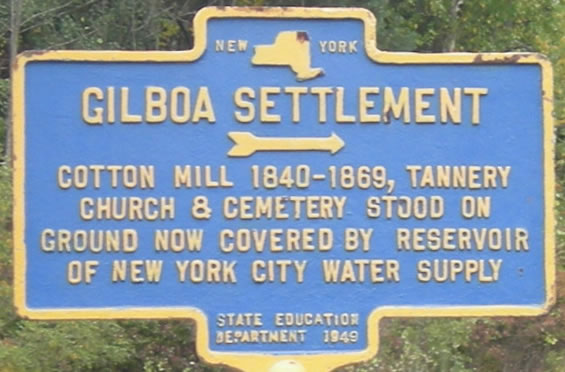
Gilboa Historical Sign

== Communities and locations in Gilboa ==
- Blenheim-Gilboa Reservoir – A reservoir partly in the northwestern part of Gilboa.
- Broome Center – A hamlet in the northeastern part of the town located on County Road 17, settled around 1850.
- Five Corners – A location south of Mackey at the junction of County Roads 17 and 18.
- Flat Creek – A hamlet in the eastern part of the town on County Road 17.
- Gilboa – The hamlet of Gilboa is north of the Gilboa Reservoir.
- Gilboa-Conesville Central School – The only school in Gilboa.
- Mackey – A hamlet west of Broome Center.
- Mayham Pond – A small lake north of South Gilboa Station.
- Owlsville – A hamlet in the northeastern section of the town.
- Schoharie Reservoir – A reservoir partly in the southeastern corner of the town, south of Gilboa village.
- South Gilboa – A hamlet in the southwestern part of Gilboa on County Road 14. The Forks in the Road Schoolhouse and South Gilboa Railroad Station are listed on the National Register of Historic Places.
- South Gilboa Station – A location in the southwestern part of the town on NY-23.
- Upper Blenheim-Gilboa Reservoir – A reservoir in the northwestern section of Gilboa, east of the Blenheim-Gilboa Reservoir.
- Welch Corners – A location in the northwestern part of the town.
