= Schoharie Reservoir =

- Location within New York Schoharie Reservoir (the United States)
- Location: Catskill Mountains, Schoharie / Delaware / Greene counties, New York, United States
- Coordinates: 42°22′16″N 74°26′23″W
- Type: Reservoir
- Primary inflows: Schoharie Creek, Manor Kill
- Primary outflows: Schoharie Creek, Shandaken Tunnel
- Basin countries: United States
- Surface area: 1,159 acres (4.69 km^{2})
- Water volume: 17.6 billion US gallons (67,000,000 m^{3})
- Surface elevation: 1,125 ft (343 m)

The Schoharie Reservoir is a reservoir in the New York City water supply system located in the Catskill Mountains of New York State. One of 19 reservoirs in the system, it was created by impounding Schoharie Creek, and feeds via the Ashokan Reservoir into the Catskill Aqueduct. These waters route to the Kensico Reservoir in Westchester County, thence to New York City.

Portions of the reservoir lie in the towns of Conesville and Gilboa in Schoharie County, Roxbury in Delaware County, and Prattsville in Greene County.

== History ==
Even after the Ashokan Reservoir was created as New York City's thirteenth reservoir and the Kensico Reservoir was completed soon after to store its water, the water supply was still insufficient for the city's growing population. A search for a new location led to the village of Gilboa, New York, which was purchased and its residents evacuated through condemnation.

Site preparation destroyed most of the area's trees and buildings up to the water line. The dam was built during the early 1920s out of stone blocks. Flooding was completed in 1924. The village of Gilboa was relocated to the west; traces of it can still be seen during a drought.

== Description ==
The reservoir impounds a portion of the Schoharie Creek, a tributary of the Mohawk River, itself a tributary of the Hudson River. The northernmost of the New York City system, it is located 36 miles (58 km) southwest of Albany and roughly 110 miles (180 km) northwest of New York City. It lies at the southern end of Schoharie County, the northeastern end of Delaware County, and at the northwestern end of Greene County. It neighbors such towns as Gilboa, Prattsville, and Conesville.

The reservoir consists of a single 6-mile (9.6-km) basin, and holds 17.6 billion US gallons (67,000,000 m^{3}) of water at full capacity, making it one of the smaller New York City reservoirs. Put into service in 1926, the Schoharie Reservoir provides nine million people with approximately 15-16 percent of their annual water supply needs. It is also the smaller of the two reservoirs which, along with the Ashokan Reservoir, in Olive, New York, feed the Catskill Aqueduct and make up the New York City Catskill Water System. Overflow from the Schoharie Reservoir tops the Gilboa Dam and runs back into Schoharie Creek, ultimately flowing into the Hudson River.

Water from the Schoharie Reservoir flows to New York City through the 16-mile-long (26 km) Shandaken Tunnel, and empties into the Esopus Creek at Shandaken. Another 11 miles (18 km) down the Esopus it empties into the Ashokan Reservoir. From there water enters the 92-mile (147 km) Catskill Aqueduct to the Kensico Reservoir, thence to New York City.

== Gilboa Dam ==
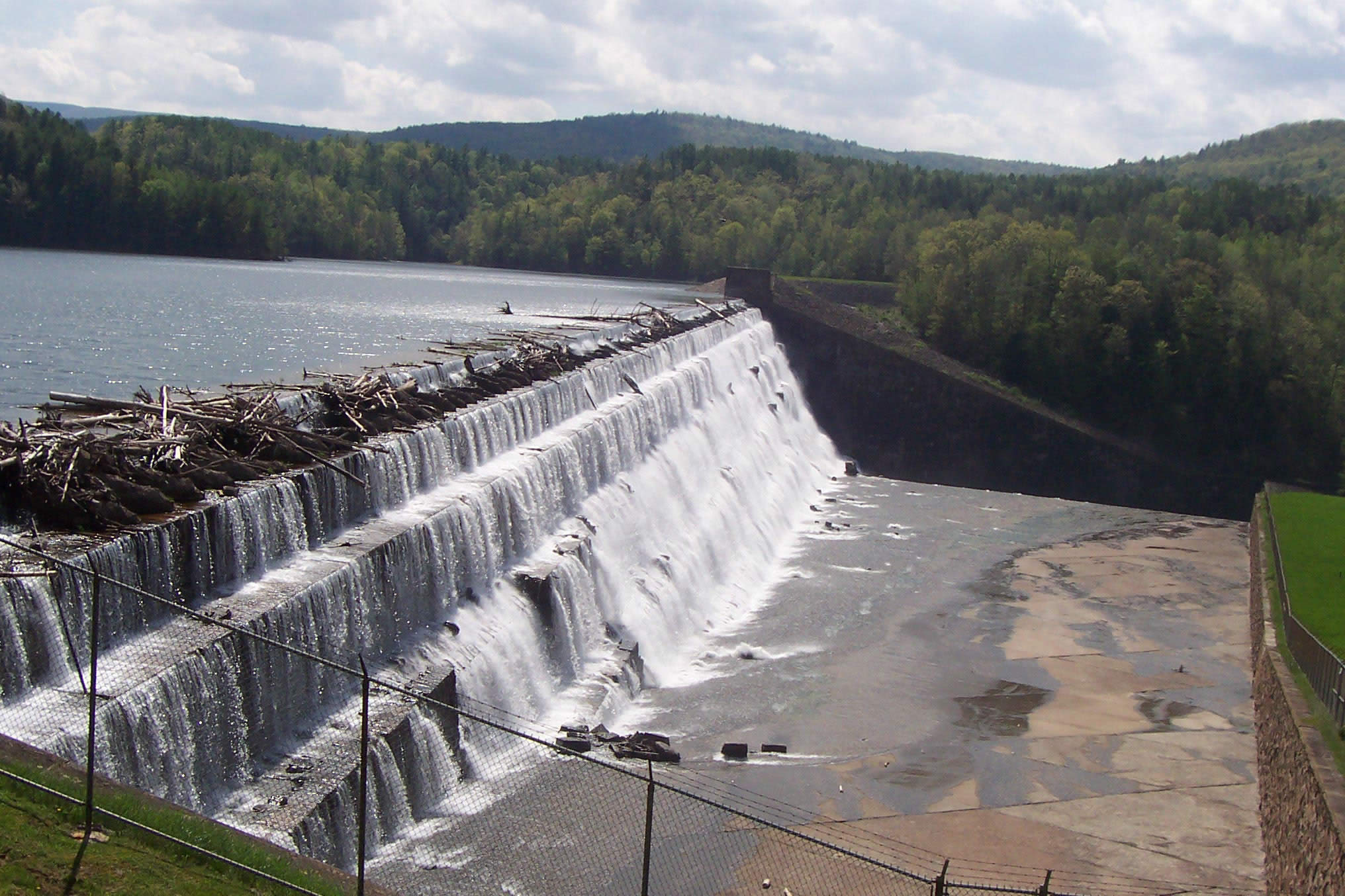
Water flowing over the spillway at the Gilboa Dam

The 120-foot (37 m) high concrete and stone brick Gilboa Dam 42°23′30″N 74°26′59″W in Schoharie County was completed in 1926. Over time the dam eroded to where it posed a potential threat to those living downstream. In December 2005, the New York City Department of Environmental Protection began a $24 million project to bring the dam up to New York State safety standards. Beginning in December 2006 eighty post-tensioned anchoring cables were installed through holes drilled in the dam into bedrock below, bringing it up to state standards. During this overhaul, residents nearby complained that their tap water had turned a brownish color, perhaps due to the intense drilling into the earth to anchor the dam.

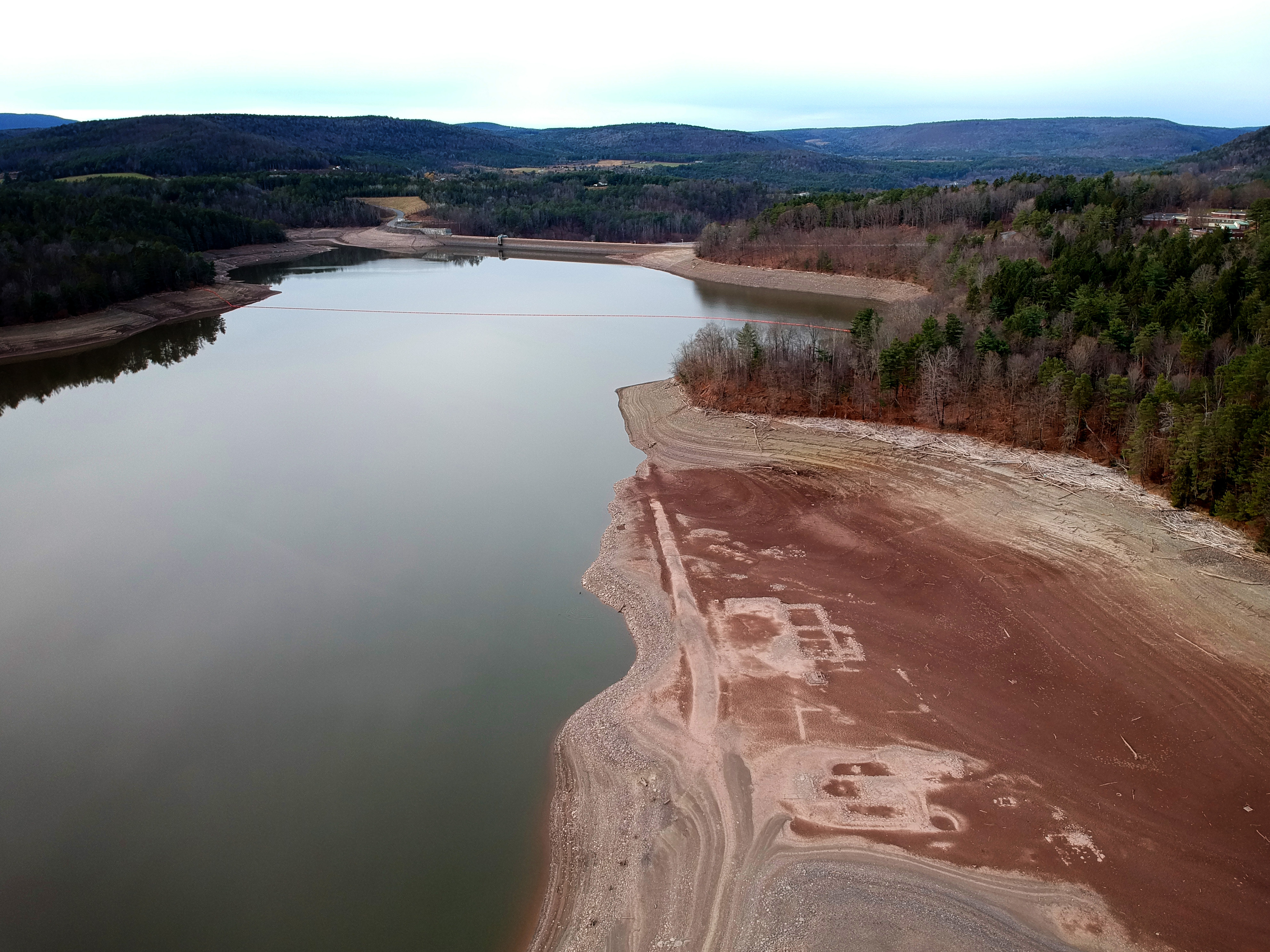
Foundations and part of a road from the flooded town of Gilboa, New York, visible during the drought in October/November of 2024

Schoharie County planned and authorized the Gilboa Dam Failure Outdoor Warning System, which was installed by Mid-State Communications. New York City paid for the system consisting of twenty sirens stretching from the Town of Gilboa to the Town of Esperance, ending at the Montgomery County line.

A larger, full-scale overhaul of the Gilboa Dam began in the summer of 2011 after five years of planning. Estimated to cost $350 million, the project will add significant mass to the dam, install floodgates, and include a large tunnel bypass allowing water to be released safely from the reservoir into Schoharie Creek. A citizens advocacy group, called Dam Concerned Citizens, Inc., was formed to monitor structural vulnerabilities in order to ensure the safety of those living downstream.

After a minor earthquake on August 27, 2011, was recorded in the region and in response to the 2011 Virginia earthquake which occurred on August 23, 2011, and was felt as far north as Canada, New York Governor Andrew Cuomo ordered an infrastructure inspection which included the Gilboa Dam. Governor Cuomo visited the dam on the morning of August 28, 2011, to report that officials had discovered no impacts to the dam from recent seismic activity.

On August 28, 2011, after receiving as much as 12 inches (300 mm) of rainfall from Hurricane Irene, the Gilboa Dam was placed in a level B situation. Though the dam was intact, the heavy upstream rainfall from the hurricane prompted officials to issue an evacuation order for downstream residents, including a mandatory evacuation of the towns of Middleburgh and Schoharie.

== Recreation ==
No motor boats are allowed on the reservoir; non-motorized boats that have been steam-cleaned and that have required tags may be used in the reservoir during the summer.

== See also ==
- List of reservoirs and dams in New York
