= Prattsville (CDP), New York =

Prattsville, New York
- Census-designated place
- Location within New York Location within the United States
- Coordinates: 42°18′53″N 74°25′58″W
- Country: United States
- State: New York
- County: Greene
- Town: Prattsville

Area
  - Total: 4.04 sq mi (10.46 km^{2})
  - Land: 4.04 sq mi (10.46 km^{2})
  - Water: 0 sq mi (0.00 km^{2})
- Elevation: 1,165 ft (355 m)

Population (2020)
  - Total: 384
  - Density: 95.1/sq mi (36.72/km^{2})
- Time zone: UTC-5 (Eastern (EST))
  - Summer (DST): UTC-4 (EDT)
- ZIP code: 12468
- Area code: 518
- FIPS code: 36-59740
- GNIS feature ID: 961103

Prattsville is a hamlet and census-designated place (CDP) in the town of Prattsville, Greene County, New York, United States. The population of the CDP was 384 at the 2020 census, out of a total population of 774 in the town in 2020.

== Geography ==
Prattsville is located in western Greene County and occupies the central and northwestern sections of the town of Prattsville. The CDP is bordered to the southwest by Schoharie Creek and to the southeast by its tributary, Batavia Kill. The northwestern edge of the CDP follows the Delaware County line, and the far northern extent of the CDP borders Schoharie County.

New York State Route 23 is Prattsville's Main Street, leading northwest 39 miles (63 km) to Oneonta on the Susquehanna River and southeast 36 miles (58 km) to Catskill on the Hudson River.

According to the United States Census Bureau, the Prattsville CDP has a total area of 4.1 square miles (10.5 km^{2}), all land.

== Demographics ==
Historical population
Census	Pop.	Note	%±
2010	355		—
2020	384		8.2%
U.S. Decennial Census
