= National Wetlands Inventory =

The National Wetlands Inventory (NWI) was established by the United States Fish and Wildlife Service (FWS) to conduct a nationwide inventory of U.S. wetlands to provide biologists and others with information on the distribution and type of wetlands to aid in conservation efforts. To do this, the NWI developed a wetland classification system (Cowardin et al. 1979) that is now the official FWS wetland classification system and the Federal standard for wetland classification (adopted by the Federal Geographic Data Committee on July 29, 1996: 61 Federal Register 39465). The NWI also developed techniques for mapping and recording the inventory findings. The NWI relies on trained image analysts to identify and classify wetlands and deepwater habitats from aerial imagery. NWI started mapping wetlands at a small scale (1:250,000 map which covers an area the size of 128–1:24,000 USGS topographic maps or approximately 7,400 square miles). Eventually, large-scale (1:24K scale) maps became the standard product delivered by NWI. As computerized mapping and geospatial technology evolved, NWI discontinued production of paper maps in favor of distributing data via online "mapping tools" where information can be viewed and downloaded. Today, FWS serves its data via an on-line data discovery "Wetlands Mapper". GIS users can access wetlands data through an online wetland mapping service or download data for various applications (maps, data analyses, and reports). The techniques used by NWI have recently been adopted by the Federal Geographic Data Committee as the federal wetland mapping standard (FGDC Wetlands Subcommittee 2009). This standard applies to all federal grants involving wetland mapping to insure the data can be added to the Wetlands Layer of the National Spatial Data Infrastructure. NWI also produces national wetlands status and trends reports required by the United States Congress.
