= Blackhead (New York) =

Mountain in the United States

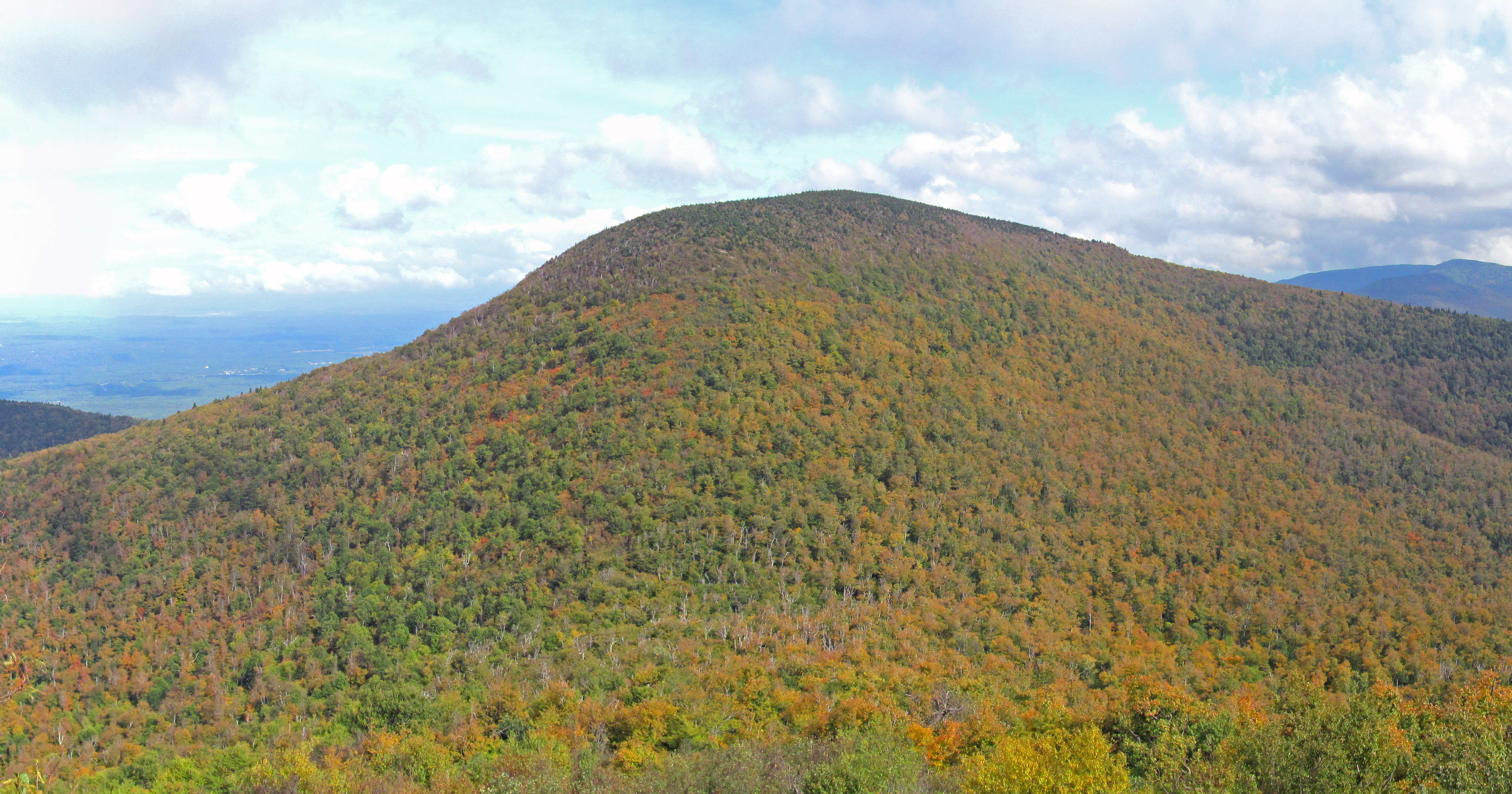
- Blackhead Mountain from Black Dome to the west

Highest point
- Elevation: 3940+ ft (1201+ m) NGVD 29
- Prominence: 500 ft (150 m)
- Listing: Catskill High Peaks 5th
- Coordinates: 42°16′04″N 74°06′16″W

Geography
- Location: Greene County, New York, U.S.
- Parent range: Blackhead Mountains
- Topo map(s): USGS Freehold, NY

Blackhead is a mountain located in Greene County, New York.

The mountain is part of the Blackhead range of the Catskill Mountains. Blackhead is flanked to the northeast by Black Dome and Acra Point is located north.

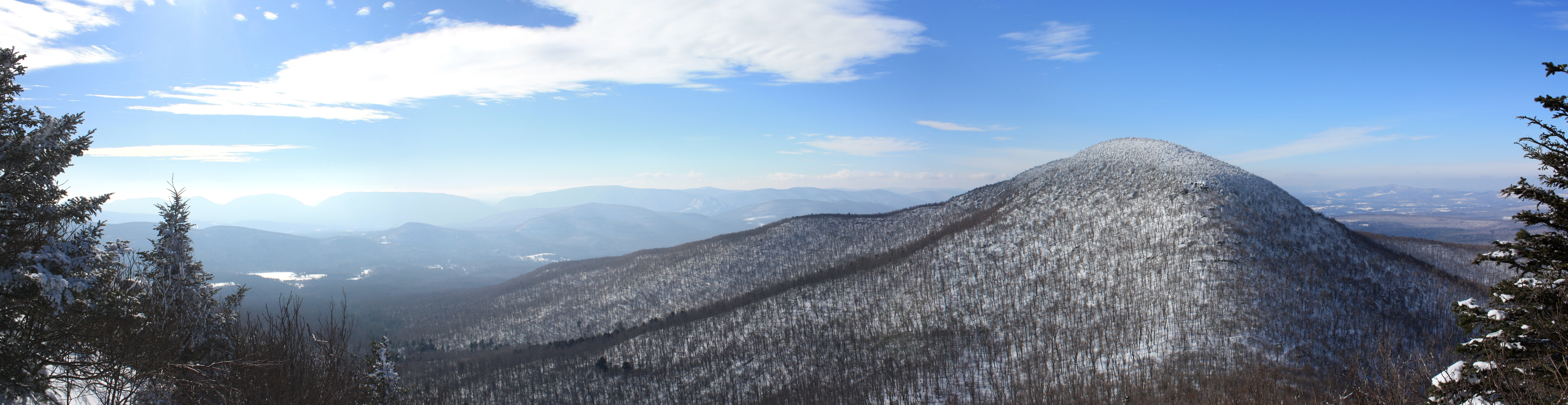
A panoramic view from Blackhead Mountain. The prominent peak in the foreground is Black Dome.

Blackhead stands within the watershed of the Hudson River, which drains into New York Bay. The southwest side of Blackhead drains into East Kill, thence into Schoharie Creek, the Mohawk River, and the Hudson River. The north side of Blackhead drains into the headwaters of Batavia Kill, and thence into Schoharie Creek. The east side of Blackhead drains into Trout Brook, thence into Shingle Kill, Catskill Creek, and the Hudson River.

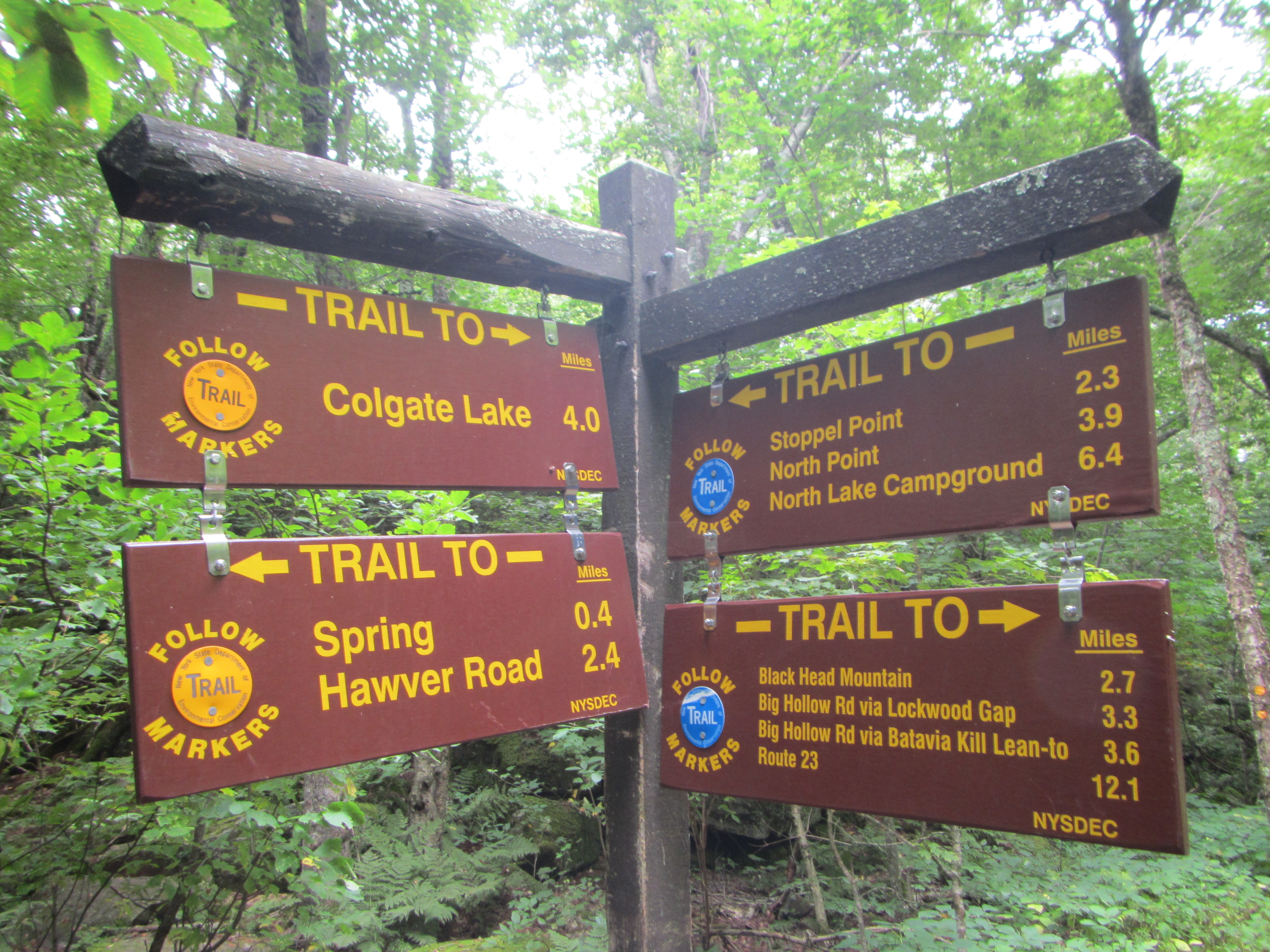
Trail junction on hike to Blackhead

Blackhead is within New York's Catskill Park. The Long Path, a 350-mile (560 km) long-distance hiking trail from New York City to Albany, is contiguous with the Escarpment Trail.

== See also ==
- List of mountains in New York
- Catskill High Peaks
- Catskill Mountain 3500 Club
