= Black Dome (New York) =

Mountain in New York, United States

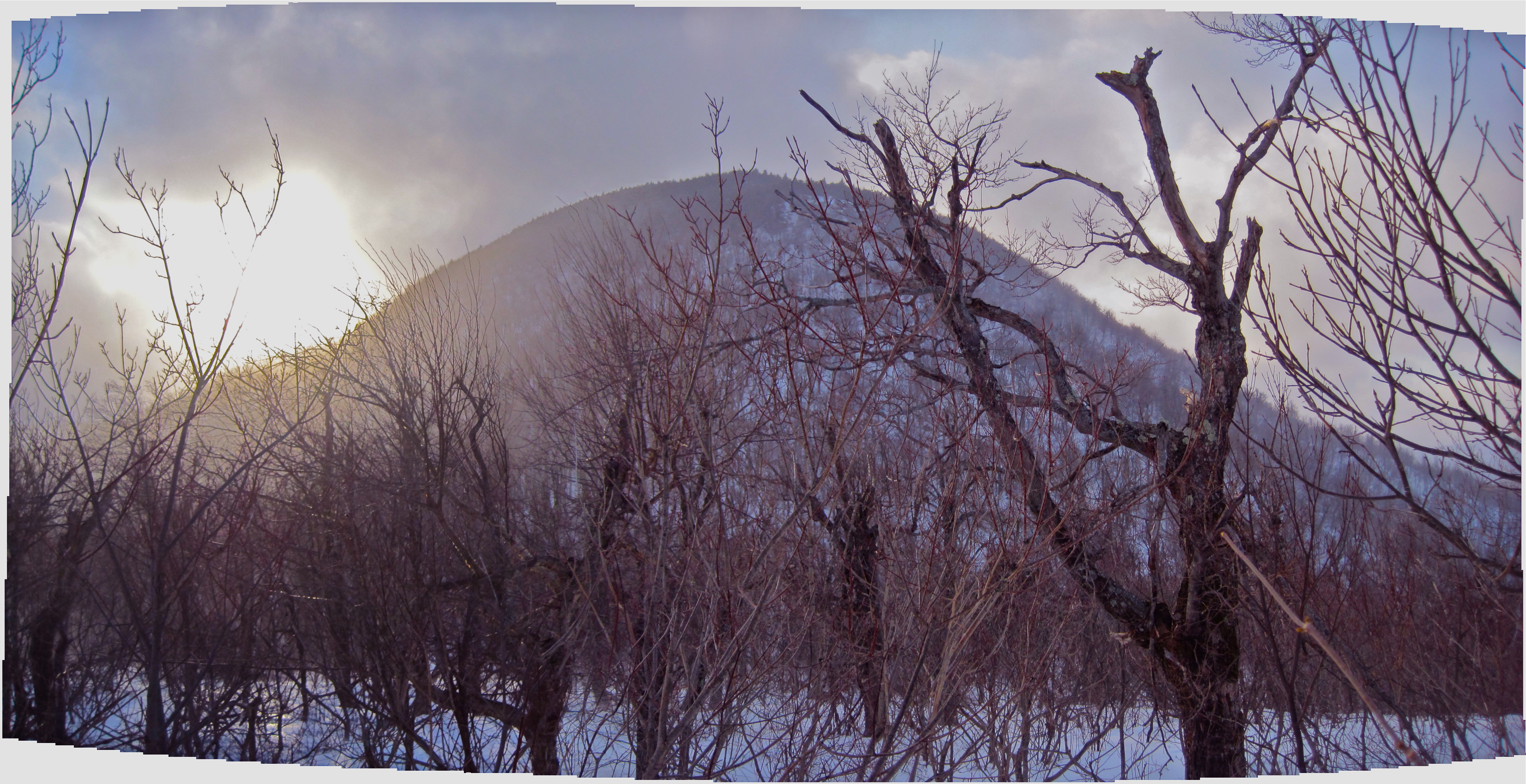
- Eastern side of Black Dome.

Highest point
- Elevation: 3980+ ft, (1213+ m) NGVD 29
- Prominence: 2,060 ft (630 m)
- Listing: Catskill High Peaks 3rd
- Coordinates: 42°16′12″N 74°07′21″W

Geography
- Location within New York Location within the United States
- Location: Greene County, New York
- Parent range: Catskill Mountains
- Topo map(s): USGS Freehold, NY

See Black Dome for other mountains of this name.

Black Dome is a mountain located in Greene County, New York. The mountain is the highest peak of the Blackhead Mountains range of the Catskills. Black Dome is flanked to the east by Blackhead, and to the west by Thomas Cole Mountain.

Black Dome stands within the watershed of Schoharie Creek, which drains into the Mohawk River, the Hudson River, and into New York Bay. The south side of Black Dome drains into East Kill, and thence into Schoharie Creek. The north side of Black Dome drains into Batavia Kill, and thence into Schoharie Creek.

Black Dome is within New York's Catskill Park.

== See also ==
- List of mountains in New York
- Catskill High Peaks
- Catskill Mountain 3500 Club
