= Thomas Cole Mountain =

Mountain in the United States of America

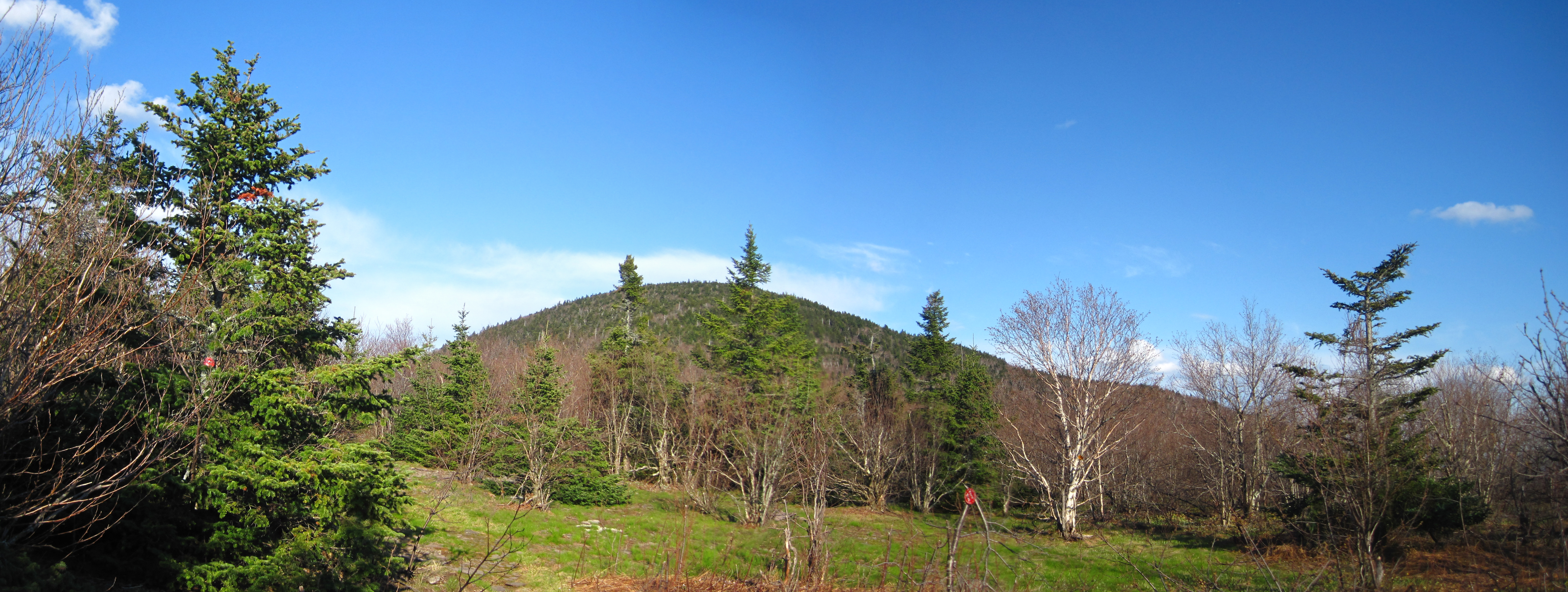
- Spring view of Thomas Cole, from the west.

Highest point
- Elevation: 3,953 feet (1,200 m)
- Prominence: 220 ft (70 m)
- Listing: Catskill High Peaks 4th
- Coordinates: 42°16.25′N 74°8.17′W

Geography
- Location: Greene County, New York
- Parent range: Catskill Mountains
- Topo map: USGS Hensonville

Climbing
- Easiest route: Trail

Thomas Cole Mountain is a mountain in Greene County, New York. The mountain is named after the artist Thomas Cole (1801–1848), who lived in the area and is regarded as the founder of the Hudson River School.

Thomas Cole Mountain is part of the Blackhead range, and is the fourth highest peak of the broader Catskill Mountains. Thomas Cole is flanked to the east by Black Dome (3,990 feet or 1,220 metres), and to the west by Camel's Hump (3,530 feet or 1,080 metres).

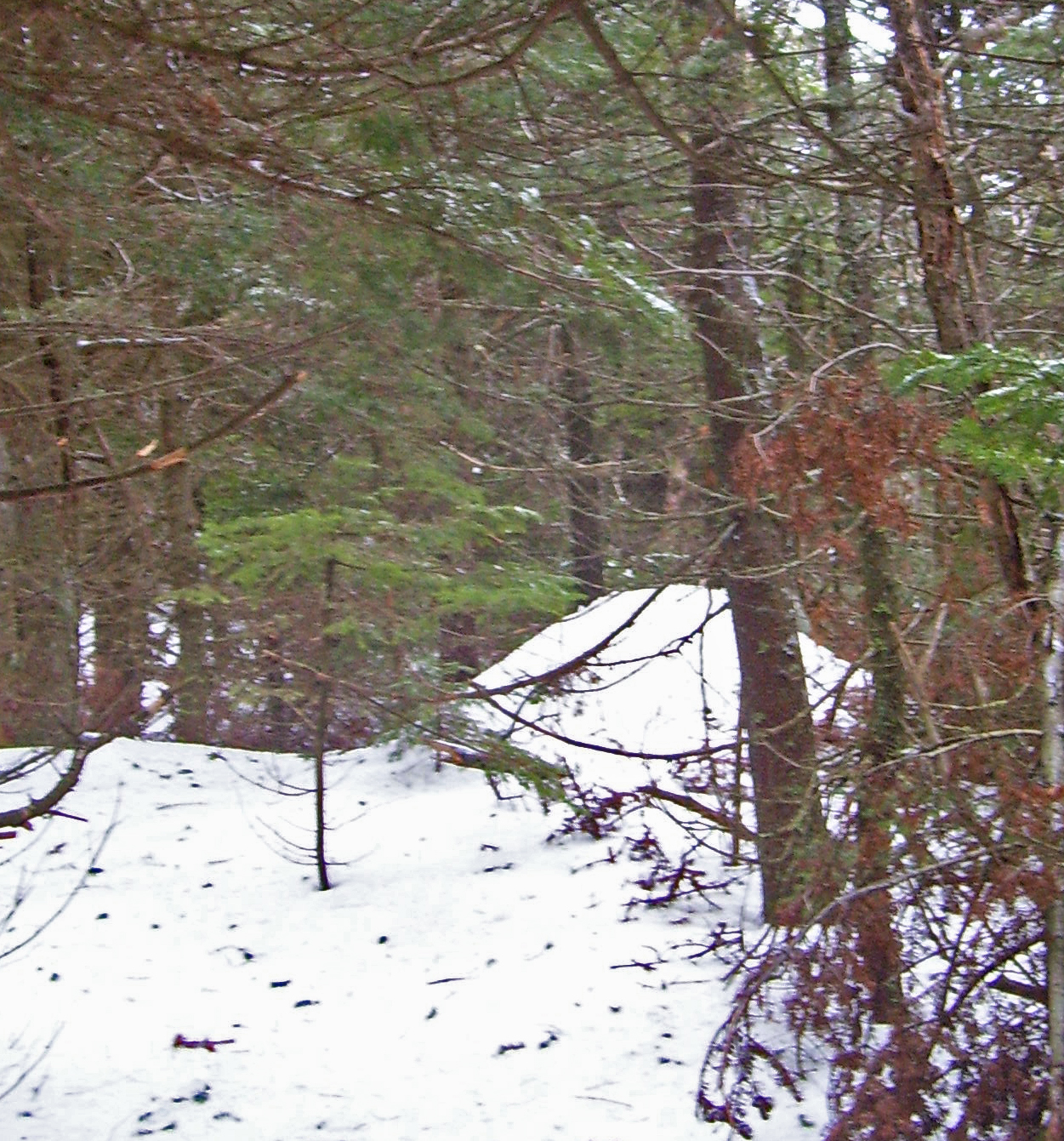
Summit of mountain, slightly off the main trail.

Thomas Cole Mountain stands within the watershed of Schoharie Creek, which drains into the Mohawk River, the Hudson River, and into New York Bay. The south side of Thomas Cole drains into East Kill, and thence into Schoharie Creek. The north side of Thomas Cole drains into Batavia Kill, and thence into Schoharie Creek.

Thomas Cole Mountain is within New York's Catskill Park.

== See also ==
- List of mountains in New York
- Catskill High Peaks
- Catskill Mountain 3500 Club
