= Jewett, New York =

- Town
- Location in Greene County and the state of New York.
- Coordinates: 42°14′57″N 74°14′39″W
- Country: United States
- State: New York
- County: Greene

Government
  - Type: Town Council
  - Town Supervisor: Greg Kroyer (R)
  - Town Council: Members' List: • Jim Pellitteri (R); • Marianne Romito (D); • Carol Muth(R); • John Giordano(R)

Area
  - Total: 50.52 sq mi (130.85 km^{2})
  - Land: 50.32 sq mi (130.34 km^{2})
  - Water: 0.20 sq mi (0.51 km^{2})
- Elevation: 1,703 ft (519 m)

Population (2020)
  - Total: 879
- Time zone: UTC-5 (Eastern (EST))
  - Summer (DST): UTC-4 (EDT)
- ZIP Codes: 12444 (Jewett); 12424 (East Jewett); 12439 (Hensonville); 12442 (Hunter)
- Area code: 518
- FIPS code: 36-38638
- GNIS feature ID: 979108
- Website: Official website

Jewett is a town centrally located in Greene County, New York, United States. The population was 879 at the 2020 census. The town is named for Freeborn G. Jewett, justice of the New York Supreme Court.

== History ==
The New York area was first settled by New Netherland in 1614. By 1664, the English took possession of the area. The town of Jewett was officially formed in 1849 from the towns of Hunter and Lexington.

== Geography ==
According to the United States Census Bureau, the town has a total area of 50.5 square miles (131 km^{2}), of which 50.3 square miles (130 km^{2}) is land and 0.2 square miles (0.52 km^{2}), or 0.34%, is water.

The town is in the Catskill Mountains and in the Catskill Park.

== Demographics ==
Historical population
Census	Pop.	Note	%±
1850	1,452		—
1860	1,145		−21.1%
1870	1,105		−3.5%
1880	1,075		−2.7%
1890	976		−9.2%
1900	1,028		5.3%
1910	1,057		2.8%
1920	883		−16.5%
1930	835		−5.4%
1940	732		−12.3%
1950	692		−5.5%
1960	562		−18.8%
1970	442		−21.4%
1980	723		63.6%
1990	933		29.0%
2000	970		4.0%
2010	953		−1.8%
2020	879		−7.8%
U.S. Decennial Census

As of the census of 2000, there were 970 people, 405 households, and 279 families residing in the town. The population density was 19.3 inhabitants per square mile (7.5/km^{2}). There were 1,026 housing units at an average density of 20.4 per square mile (7.9/km^{2}). The racial makeup of the town was 97.73% White, 0.10% African American, 0.93% Asian, 0.31% from other races, and 0.93% from two or more races. Hispanic or Latino of any race were 2.99% of the population.

There were 405 households, out of which 25.4% had children under the age of 18 living with them, 59.5% were married couples living together, 5.9% had a female householder with no husband present, and 30.9% were non-families. 25.9% of all households were made up of individuals, and 10.4% had someone living alone who was 65 years of age or older. The average household size was 2.40 and the average family size was 2.89.

In the town, the population was spread out, with 22.0% under the age of 18, 4.2% from 18 to 24, 25.2% from 25 to 44, 31.0% from 45 to 64, and 17.6% who were 65 years of age or older. The median age was 44 years. For every 100 females, there were 102.1 males. For every 100 females age 18 and over, there were 100.3 males.

The median income for a household in the town was $41,172, and the median income for a family was $46,250. Males had a median income of $35,909 versus $25,000 for females. The per capita income for the town was $22,440. About 8.1% of families and 12.0% of the population were below the poverty line, including 22.2% of those under age 18 and 6.7% of those age 65 or over.

== Communities and locations in Jewett ==
- Beaches Corners – A location north of South Jewett.
- East Jewett – A hamlet in the eastern part of the town.
- Jewett – The hamlet of Jewett is in the northwestern part of the town.
- Jewett Center – A hamlet south of Jewett hamlet on Route 17.
- South Jewett A hamlet on Route 23A west of the village of Hunter.
- West Jewett – A hamlet southwest of Jewett hamlet.
