= Maplecrest, New York =

- Hamlet
- Location within New York Location within the United States
- Coordinates: 42°16′33″N 74°11′13″W
- Country: United States
- State: New York
- County: Greene
- Elevation: 1,762 ft (537 m)
- Time zone: UTC-5 (Eastern (EST))
  - Summer (DST): UTC-4 (EDT)
- ZIP code: 12454
- Area codes: 518 & 838
- GNIS feature ID: 956456

Maplecrest is a hamlet in the town of Windham, Greene County, New York, United States. The community is 4.6 miles (7.4 km) north-northeast of Hunter. Maplecrest has a post office with ZIP code 12454.
