= National Register of Historic Places listings in Greene County, New York =

Location of Greene County in New York

List of the National Register of Historic Places listings in Greene County, New York

This is intended to be a complete list of properties and districts listed on the National Register of Historic Places in Greene County, New York. The locations of National Register properties and districts (at least for all showing latitude and longitude coordinates below) may be seen in a map by clicking on "Map of all coordinates". Two properties, the Pieter Bronck House and the Thomas Cole House, are further designated U.S. National Historic Landmarks, and the latter is also a National Historic Site.

This National Park Service list is complete through NPS recent listings posted December 19, 2025.

Contents: Counties in New York
Albany (Albany) – Allegany – Bronx – Broome – Cattaraugus – Cayuga – Chautauqua – Chemung – Chenango – Clinton – Columbia – Cortland – Delaware – Dutchess (Poughkeepsie, Rhinebeck) – Erie (Buffalo) – Essex – Franklin – Fulton – Genesee – Greene – Hamilton – Herkimer – Jefferson – Kings – Lewis – Livingston – Madison – Monroe (Rochester) – Montgomery – Nassau – New York (Below 14th Street, 14th to 59th Streets, 59th to 110th Streets, Above 110th Street, Islands) – Niagara (Niagara Falls) – Oneida – Onondaga (Syracuse) – Ontario – Orange – Orleans – Oswego – Otsego – Putnam – Queens – Rensselaer – Richmond – Rockland – St. Lawrence – Saratoga – Schenectady – Schoharie – Schuyler – Seneca – Steuben – Suffolk – Sullivan – Tioga – Tompkins – Ulster – Warren – Washington – Wayne – Westchester (Northern, Southern, New Rochelle, Peekskill, Yonkers) – Wyoming – Yates

== Listings county-wide ==
	Name on the Register	Image	Date listed	Location	City or town	Description
1	A. T. House	A. T. House	January 18, 2006 (#05001538)	435 Main St. 42°24′40″N 74°09′14″W	Oak Hill	
2	All Souls Church	All Souls Church	November 24, 1993 (#93001223)	Rt. 23-C north of Tannersville; 42°13′29″N 74°08′05″W	Tannersville	
3	Allan Teator Road Stone Arch Bridge	Allan Teator Road Stone Arch Bridge	January 9, 2008 (#07001365)	Allan Teator Rd. 42°24′27″N 74°13′12″W	West Durham	
4	Captain Joseph Allen House	Captain Joseph Allen House	July 29, 2022 (#100007952)	210 Jefferson Hts. 42°14′00″N 73°52′52″W	Catskill	
5	The Alpine	The Alpine	August 4, 2023 (#100009189)	5430 NY 23A; 42°11′46″N 74°06′19″W	Hunter	
6	Athens Lower Village Historic District	Athens Lower Village Historic District	November 28, 1980 (#80002616)	Roughly bounded by Hudson River, NY 385, Vernon and Market Sts. 42°15′34″N 73°48′46″W	Athens	
7	Henry T. Botsford House	Henry T. Botsford House	November 12, 1993 (#93001224)	NY 81 west of the junction with NY 32; 42°24′24″N 74°01′28″W	Greenville	
8	Brand Hollow Road Stone Arch Bridge	Brand Hollow Road Stone Arch Bridge	April 10, 2008 (#08000271)	Brand Hollow Road; 42°24′12″N 74°14′22″W	West Durham	
9	William Brandow House	William Brandow House	November 10, 2009 (#09000908)	480 Rt. 385; 42°15′04″N 73°50′06″W	Athens	
10	Brick Row Historic District	Brick Row Historic District	November 28, 1980 (#80002617)	Off NY 385; 42°16′39″N 73°47′55″W	Athens	
11	Bronck Farm 13-Sided Barn	Bronck Farm 13-Sided Barn	September 29, 1984 (#84002395)	Old Kings Rd. 42°20′46″N 73°50′42″W	Coxsackie	
12	Pieter Bronck House	Pieter Bronck House	December 24, 1967 (#67000012)	2 miles (3.2 km) west of Coxsackie on west side of U.S. 9W; 42°20′44″N 73°50′49″W	Coxsackie	1667 stone house is oldest standing building in upstate New York
13	Bronk-Silvester House	Bronk-Silvester House	March 12, 2002 (#02000140)	188 Mansion St. 42°21′33″N 73°48′51″W	Coxsackie	
14	Centre Presbyterian Church	Centre Presbyterian Church	September 7, 1979 (#79001586)	Main and Church Sts; 42°18′24″N 74°15′09″W	Windham	
15	Christ Church	Christ Church	November 16, 2015 (#15000800)	11228 NY 32; 42°25′01″N 74°01′20″W	Greenville	Also called Christ Episcopal Church; well-preserved 1857 Gothic Revival church made of locally quarried red sandstone
16	Church of St. John the Evangelist	Church of St. John the Evangelist	April 21, 2004 (#04000352)	Philadelphia Hill Rd. 42°10′56″N 74°08′53″W	Hunter	
17	L.E. Cleveland House	L.E. Cleveland House	December 28, 2001 (#01001385)	7818 NY 81; 42°24′38″N 74°09′10″W	Durham	
18	Thomas Cole House	Thomas Cole House	October 15, 1966 (#66000522)	218 Spring St. 42°13′33″N 73°51′43″W	Catskill	Home of Hudson River School painter
19	Commercial Building at 32 West Bridge Street	Commercial Building at 32 West Bridge Street	August 10, 1995 (#95000961)	32 W. Bridge St. 42°13′01″N 73°52′12″W	Catskill	
20	Cornwallville Cemetery	Cornwallville Cemetery	January 31, 2017 (#100000613)	County Road 20; 42°22′02″N 74°09′25″W	Cornwallville	1824 cemetery has graves of many of the area's first settlers, including Daniel Cornwall, a Revolutionary War veteran from Connecticut who gave the hamlet its name
21	Croswell-Parsons Paper Mill Ruin	Croswell-Parsons Paper Mill Ruin	November 9, 2008 (#07001366)	NY 144; 42°27′30″N 73°48′01″W	New Baltimore	
22	W. F. DeWitt Hotel	W. F. DeWitt Hotel	December 28, 2001 (#01001389)	7803 NY 81; 42°24′35″N 74°09′11″W	Durham	
23	District School No. 11	District School No. 11	August 10, 1995 (#95000964)	S. Jefferson Ave. 42°13′51″N 73°52′51″W	Catskill	
24	DuBois Stone House	DuBois Stone House	November 22, 1995 (#95001336)	347 W. Main St. 42°13′09″N 73°52′11″W	Catskill	
25	Benjamin DuBois Stone House-Captain Martin Stone House	Benjamin DuBois Stone House-Captain Martin Stone House	November 22, 1995 (#95001333)	347 W. Main St. 42°13′14″N 73°52′12″W	Catskill	(distinct from DuBois Stone House though listed at same address)
26	Dunix	Dunix	April 30, 2018 (#100002364)	593 Cornwallville Road; 42°20′44″N 74°08′33″W	Cornwallville	1855 stone house turned into summer retreat later by John Matthews, pioneering manufacturer of soda fountain equipment
27	East Side Historic District	East Side Historic District	August 9, 1982 (#82004779)	Roughly bounded by Catskill Creek, the Hudson River, and River, Harrison, Day, and Gardner Sts. 42°13′07″N 73°51′44″W	Catskill	
28	ELEANOR (Sailing Sloop)		December 27, 1982 (#82001174)	Off Lower Main St. in Catskill Creek; 42°12′44″N 73°51′41″W	Catskill	
29	Elka Park Historic District		May 22, 1993 (#93000399)	Southeast of the Hunter town center 42°09′19″N 74°10′05″W	Hunter	
30	Harry Fischel House	Harry Fischel House	April 21, 2000 (#00000348)	6302 Main St. 42°12′40″N 74°12′56″W	Hunter	
31	Flint Mine Hill Archeological District		November 29, 1978 (#78001852)	Address Restricted	Coxsackie	
32	Ford's Store	Ford's Store	December 28, 2001 (#01001395)	7811 NY 81; 42°24′35″N 74°09′11″W	Durham	
33	Forestville Commonwealth		November 20, 1974 (#74001242)	Address Restricted	Earlton	
34	Greenville Presbyterian Church Complex	Greenville Presbyterian Church Complex	March 28, 1985 (#85000657)	North St., NY 32; 42°24′58″N 74°01′23″W	Greenville	1860 Greek Revival church is home to first non-Dutch congregation established in Catskill region
35	Aaron Haines Family Cemetery	Aaron Haines Family Cemetery	May 18, 2018 (#SG100002462)	5132 NY 23A; 42°11′47″N 74°05′35″W	Haines Falls	Final resting place of members of family that gave Haines Falls its name
36	Halcott Grange No. 881	Halcott Grange No. 881	April 6, 2000 (#00000351)	County Route 3; 42°11′27″N 74°29′10″W	Halcott	
37	Joseph Hallock House	Joseph Hallock House	August 10, 1995 (#95000958)	241 W. Main St. 42°12′59″N 73°52′08″W	Catskill	
38	Hathaway	Hathaway	February 12, 2008 (#08000023)	781 County Road 25; 42°13′27″N 74°07′40″W	Tannersville	
39	Haxton–Griffin Farm	Haxton–Griffin Farm	January 4, 2012 (#11000999)	84 Howard Hall Rd. 42°15′23″N 73°50′10″W	Athens	
40	Hervey Street Road Stone Arch Bridge	Hervey Street Road Stone Arch Bridge	January 9, 2008 (#07001367)	Hervey Street Rd., & Hervey Street-Sunside Rd. 42°20′42″N 74°07′37″W	Hervey Street	
41	Hop-o'-Nose Knitting Mill	Hop-o'-Nose Knitting Mill	August 10, 1995 (#95000959)	130 W. Main St. 42°12′46″N 73°52′01″W	Catskill	
42	Peter Houghtaling Farm and Lime Kiln	Peter Houghtaling Farm and Lime Kiln	March 20, 1986 (#86000491)	Lime Kiln Rd. 42°23′36″N 73°51′18″W	West Coxsackie	
43	Hudson/Athens Lighthouse	Hudson/Athens Lighthouse	May 29, 1979 (#79003796)	South of Middle Ground Flats in Hudson River; 42°15′06″N 73°48′32″W	Athens	
44	Hunter Mountain Fire Tower	Hunter Mountain Fire Tower	June 30, 1997 (#97000569)	Roughly following Hunter Brook from Spruceton Rd. to Hunter Mountain; 42°11′03″N 74°15′06″W	Hunter	First site in the Catskills staffed by the state as fire lookout tower in 1909
45	Hunter Synagogue	Hunter Synagogue	December 9, 1999 (#99001484)	Main St. 42°12′38″N 74°12′57″W	Hunter	
46	IOOF Hall	IOOF Hall	December 31, 2002 (#02001642)	6325 Main St. 42°12′43″N 74°13′03″W	Hunter	
47	Jewett Presbyterian Church Complex	Jewett Presbyterian Church Complex	December 28, 2001 (#01001382)	Church St. 42°16′12″N 74°18′15″W	Jewett	
48	William Lampman House	William Lampman House	August 10, 1995 (#95000960)	147 Grandview Ave. 42°12′42″N 73°52′22″W	Catskill	
49	John and Martinus Laraway Inn	John and Martinus Laraway Inn	July 17, 2012 (#12000419)	Main St. 42°19′07″N 74°26′08″W	Prattsville	
50	Frank D. Layman Memorial	Frank D. Layman Memorial	June 6, 2003 (#03000022)	Near Kaaterskill Falls; 42°11′24″N 74°03′55″W	Hunter	Monument on Catskill Escarpment Trail to firefighter who perished fighting forest fire there in 1901
51	Leeds Dutch Reformed Church	Leeds Dutch Reformed Church	February 22, 1996 (#96000141)	Co. Rt. 23B (Susquehanna Tpk.); 42°15′17″N 73°54′04″W	Leeds	
52	Leeds Flat Site	Leeds Flat Site	October 1, 1998 (#98001223)	Address Restricted	Catskill	
53	Lexington House	Lexington House	September 4, 1986 (#86002175)	NY 42; 42°14′23″N 74°22′00″W	Lexington	
54	Methodist Episcopal Church of Windham Centre	Methodist Episcopal Church of Windham Centre	April 27, 2009 (#09000255)	1843 NY 23; 42°18′29″N 74°14′57″W	Windham	
55	Moore-Howland Estate	Moore-Howland Estate	August 30, 2010 (#10000609)	4 New York State Route 385; 42°13′46″N 73°51′27″W	Catskill	
56	Moore Road Stone Arch Bridge	Moore Road Stone Arch Bridge	April 10, 2008 (#08000272)	Moore Rd. 42°21′11″N 74°10′19″W	Cornwallville	
57	Morss Homestead/Federal City Homestead	Morss Homestead/Federal City Homestead	September 30, 1983 (#83001680)	NY 23; 42°18′35″N 74°23′45″W	Red Falls	
58	New Baltimore Hamlet Historic District	New Baltimore Hamlet Historic District	February 23, 1996 (#96000139)	Roughly, Main St. from NY 144 to south junction with Mill St. and along NY 144, Church and New Sts. and Washington and Madison; 42°26′46″N 73°47′18″W	New Baltimore	
59	Newkirk Homestead	Newkirk Homestead	July 22, 1979 (#79001584)	Northwest of Leeds on Sandy Plains Rd. 42°15′59″N 73°54′26″W	Leeds	
60	North Settlement Methodist Church	North Settlement Methodist Church	May 16, 1996 (#96000561)	Co. Rt. 10, east of the junction with Co. Rt. 32C; 42°20′16″N 74°17′46″W	Ashland	
61	Oak Hill Cemetery	Oak Hill Cemetery	May 11, 2011 (#11000274)	NY 81; 42°24′43″N 74°09′38″W	Oak Hill	
62	Oak Hill Historic District		September 11, 2017 (#100001586)	NY 81, Oak Hill Rd., Giles Ln. 42°24′35″N 74°09′08″W	Oak Hill	Late 18th-century rural hamlet with many buildings from that period and early 19th century
63	Oak Hill Methodist Episcopal Church	Oak Hill Methodist Episcopal Church	November 1, 2006 (#06000972)	427 Main St. 42°24′45″N 74°09′18″W	Oak Hill	
64	Old Episcopal Manse	Old Episcopal Manse	November 22, 2000 (#00001415)	NY 23, Main St. 42°18′51″N 74°25′59″W	Prattsville	
65	Onteora Park Historic District		February 12, 2003 (#03000023)	Onteora Club Property; 42°12′36″N 74°09′06″W	Hunter	1880 golf course and vacation home complex
66	Mrs. Osburn House	Mrs. Osburn House	December 28, 2001 (#01001390)	7872 NY 81; 42°24′43″N 74°09′16″W	Durham	
67	The Parsonage	The Parsonage	April 6, 2005 (#05000262)	424 Main St. 42°24′45″N 74°09′21″W	Oak Hill	
68	Charles Pierce House	Charles Pierce House	December 28, 2001 (#01001386)	7846 NY 81; 42°24′41″N 74°09′12″W	Durham	
69	Old Platte Clove Post Office	Old Platte Clove Post Office	June 30, 2005 (#05000637)	2340 Platte Clove Rd. 42°08′03″N 74°05′00″W	Elka Park	1885 structure built to serve dual use as residence
70	Pratt Rock Park	Pratt Rock Park	December 10, 1992 (#92001645)	NY 23 northwest of the junction with NY 23A; 42°18′43″N 74°24′39″W	Prattsville	Rock etchings by tanner and later U.S. Congressman Zadock Pratt
71	Zadock Pratt House	Zadock Pratt House	August 14, 1986 (#86001654)	Main St. 42°18′52″N 74°25′56″W	Prattsville	
72	Prattsville Commercial Building	Prattsville Commercial Building	March 1, 1996 (#96000203)	NY 23; 42°19′01″N 74°26′06″W	Prattsville	
73	Prattsville Reformed Dutch Church	Prattsville Reformed Dutch Church	December 6, 1996 (#96001430)	Main St., northwest of the junction with Co. Rd. 10; 42°19′00″N 74°26′09″W	Prattsville	
74	Prevost Manor House	Prevost Manor House	November 15, 1972 (#72000842)	West of Greenville off NY 81; 42°24′50″N 74°03′03″W	Greenville	
75	Reed Street Historic District	Reed Street Historic District	May 6, 1980 (#80002621)	Reed, Ely, Mansion, and River Sts. 42°21′06″N 73°47′50″W	Coxsackie	
76	Rowena Memorial School	Rowena Memorial School	August 22, 2002 (#02000879)	NY 23A; 42°10′30″N 74°01′12″W	Palenville	Built early 20th century by local vacationer as gift to local community in memory of his wife; used through early 1970s.
77	Rushmore Farm	Rushmore Farm	June 18, 2010 (#10000364)	8748 US 9W; 42°20′05″N 73°50′58″W	Athens	
78	St. Francis DeSales Church	St. Francis DeSales Church	December 9, 1999 (#99001485)	Church St. 42°14′20″N 74°21′41″W	Lexington	
79	St. Mary's of the Mountain Church	St. Mary's of the Mountain Church	January 27, 1999 (#99000057)	NY 23A; 42°12′14″N 74°12′01″W	Hunter	
80	St. Paul's Lutheran Church	St. Paul's Lutheran Church	July 6, 2005 (#05000682)	464 Main St. 42°24′29″N 74°09′06″W	Oak Hill	
81	Salisbury Manor	Salisbury Manor	June 19, 1979 (#79001585)	Northwest of Leeds on NY 145; 42°15′47″N 73°55′10″W	Leeds	
82	Shady Glen Road Stone Arch Bridge	Shady Glen Road Stone Arch Bridge	January 9, 2008 (#07001368)	Shady Glen Rd. at Stone Bridge Rd. 42°22′47″N 74°08′44″W	Cornwallville	
83	Stanton Hill Cemetery	Stanton Hill Cemetery	April 26, 2016 (#16000201)	County Route 50; 42°25′53″N 73°52′23″W	Hannacroix	Cemetery established by local Quakers in 1820s, later opened to all, has collection of gravestones and funerary art from different periods
84	Stevens Hill Farm	Stevens Hill Farm	November 9, 2018 (#100003119)	4082 Grapeville Road; 42°24′56″N 74°01′00″W	Greenville	1743 farmhouse at center of farm that remained in same family for eight generations
85	Stranahan-DelVecchio House	Stranahan-DelVecchio House	November 28, 1980 (#80002618)	N. Washington St. 42°16′07″N 73°48′18″W	Athens	
86	Elijah Strong House	Elijah Strong House	January 15, 2003 (#02001711)	12278 NY 23; 42°18′14″N 74°20′30″W	Ashland	
87	Susquehannah Turnpike	Susquehannah Turnpike	January 2, 1974 (#74001241)	Beginning at Catskill, follows the Mohican Trail (NY 145) and CR 20 and 22 NW to the Schoharie County line 42°18′35″N 74°00′58″W	Catskill	
88	Tannersville Main Street Historic District	Tannersville Main Street Historic District	November 14, 2008 (#08001047)	5898-6144 Main St., 10 Spring St. 42°11′45″N 74°07′40″W	Tannersville	
89	Torry-Chittendon Farmhouse	Torry-Chittendon Farmhouse	August 30, 2010 (#10000612)	4268 County Road 20; 42°23′54″N 74°10′52″W	Durham	
90	Trinity Episcopal Church	Trinity Episcopal Church	December 6, 1996 (#96001438)	NY 23, southwest of the junction with Co. Rd. 19; 42°17′53″N 74°17′54″W	Ashland	
91	Tripp House and Store Complex	Tripp House and Store Complex	March 12, 2001 (#01000240)	NY 81; 42°24′44″N 74°09′20″W	Durham	
92	Twilight Park Historic District	Twilight Park Historic District	June 27, 2007 (#07000626)	Ledge End Rd., Spray Falls Rd., Upper Level Rd., and vicinity 42°11′21″N 74°05′15″W	Haines Falls	
93	Ulster and Delaware Railroad Station	Ulster and Delaware Railroad Station	August 8, 1996 (#96000861)	NY 23A, Hamlet of Haines Falls; 42°11′45″N 74°05′29″W	Hunter	
94	Union Chapel	Union Chapel	December 28, 2001 (#01001394)	Mill Rd. 42°21′11″N 74°14′43″W	Windham	
95	US Post Office-Catskill	US Post Office-Catskill	November 17, 1988 (#88002471)	270 Main St. 42°12′56″N 73°51′51″W	Catskill	
96	Van Bergen House	Van Bergen House	April 25, 1991 (#91000444)	Junction of U.S. 9W and Schiller Park Rd. 42°23′04″N 73°50′04″W	New Baltimore	
97	David Van Gelder Octagon House	David Van Gelder Octagon House	January 16, 1998 (#97001620)	47 Division St. 42°13′04″N 73°52′26″W	Catskill	
98	Albertus Van Loon House	Albertus Van Loon House	November 28, 1980 (#80002619)	N. Washington St. 42°16′03″N 73°48′20″W	Athens	
99	John Van Vechten House	John Van Vechten House	March 10, 1995 (#95000212)	Susquehanna Tpk. (Co. Rd. 23B); 42°15′19″N 73°54′14″W	Leeds	
100	Village of Coxsackie Cemetery	Village of Coxsackie Cemetery	May 19, 2021 (#100006511)	144 Mansion St. 42°21′26″N 73°48′39″W	Coxsackie	
101	Weldon House	Weldon House	January 7, 2000 (#99001658)	NY 145; 42°21′55″N 74°04′53″W	East Durham	
102	West Athens Hill Site		March 20, 1973 (#73001194)	Address Restricted	Athens	
103	West Settlement Methodist Church	West Settlement Methodist Church	December 6, 1996 (#96001435)	West Settlement Rd. at its junction with Cleveland Rd. 42°19′57″N 74°22′13″W	Ashland	
104	Wiley Hose Company Building	Wiley Hose Company Building	August 10, 1995 (#95000962)	30 W. Bridge St. 42°13′01″N 73°52′09″W	Catskill	
105	Woodward Road Stone Arch Bridge	Woodward Road Stone Arch Bridge	March 9, 2009 (#09000134)	Woodward Road; 42°22′17″N 74°05′46″W	East Durham	
106	Zion Lutheran Church	Zion Lutheran Church	November 28, 1980 (#80002620)	N. Washington St. 42°16′05″N 73°48′21″W	Athens	

== See also ==
- National Register of Historic Places listings in New York
