= Reformed Dutch Church =

There are many Dutch Reformed Churches, and many are called Reformed Dutch Church. These include:

- Belleville Dutch Reformed Church or Reformed Dutch Church of Second River
- Bloomingburg Reformed Protestant Dutch Church
- Dutch Reformed Church (Newburgh, New York)
- Dutch Reformed Church at Romopock
- Dutch Reformed Church in the English Neighborhood
- Dutch Reformed Church of Gansevoort
- Fairfield Dutch Reformed Church
- First Reformed Dutch Church of Bergen Neck or the First Federated Church of Bayonne
- First Reformed Dutch Church, Hackensack or the Old Church on the Green
- First Reformed Dutch Church, Somerville
- Flatbush Reformed Dutch Church Complex
- Helderberg Reformed Dutch Church
- High Bridge Reformed Church
- Holmdel Dutch Reformed Church
- Hyde Park Reformed Dutch Church
- Leeds Dutch Reformed Church
- New Hurley Reformed Church or Reformed Dutch Church of New Hurley
- New North Reformed Low Dutch Church
- North Reformed Church
- Old Bergen Church
- Old Dutch Church (Kingston, New York) or the First Reformed Protestant Dutch Church of Kingston
- Old Dutch Church of Sleepy Hollow or the Dutch Reformed Church (Sleepy Hollow)
- Prattsville Reformed Dutch Church
- Reformed Church of Beacon or the Reformed Dutch Church of Fishkill Landing
- Reformed Dutch Church of Blawenburg
- Reformed Dutch Church of Claverack
- Reformed Dutch Church (Kinderhook, New York)
- Reformed Dutch Church of Poughkeepsie
- Reformed Dutch Church of Rensselaer in Watervliet
- Reformed Dutch Church of Stone Arabia or the Stone Arabia Reformed Church
- Reformed Dutch Church of Wyckoff
- Reformed Protestant Dutch Church of Klyne Esopus or the Klyne Esopus Historical Society Museum
- Schraalenburgh North Church
- Second Reformed Dutch Church of Kingston
- Second Reformed Dutch Church
- South Bushwick Reformed Protestant Dutch Church Complex
- South Schraalenburgh Church
- St. Nicholas Collegiate Reformed Protestant Dutch Church
