= Van Vechten =

Van Vechten is a surname. Notable individuals with this surname include:

- Abraham Van Vechten (1762–1837), American lawyer and Federalist politician; New York State Attorney
- Carl Van Vechten (1880–1964), American writer and photographer
- Helen Van Vechten (1868–1949), American printer of fine press books

== See also ==
- Alice Van Vechten Brown
- J. Van Vechten Olcott
- Jacob Van Vechten Platto
- John Van Vechten House
- Van Vechten Veeder
