= The Parsonage =

A parsonage is a type of clergy house. The Parsonage may refer to:

== Places ==
in the United States (by state)

- The Parsonage (Winter Park, Florida), formerly listed on the National Register of Historic Places in Orange County, Florida
- The Parsonage (Natick, Massachusetts), U.S. National Historic Landmark, home of Horatio Alger
- The Parsonage (Oak Hill, New York), listed on the National Register of Historic Places

== Musical group ==
- The Parsonage (choir), a Scottish musical group
