= Torry-Chittenden Farmhouse =

Historic house in New York, United States

- Torry-Crittendon Farmhouse
- U.S. National Register of Historic Places
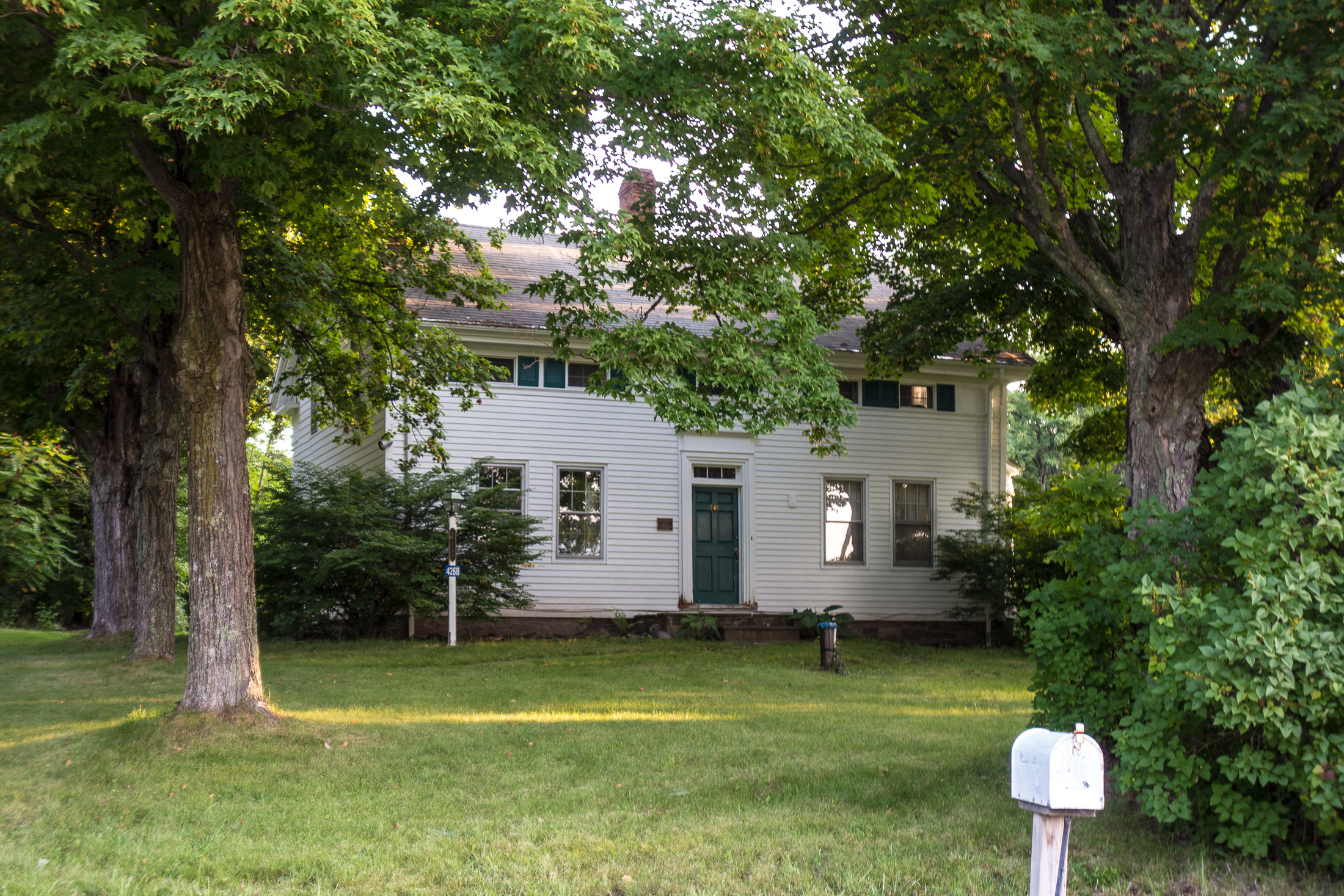

- Location within New York Location within the United States
- Location: 4268 County Road 20, Durham, New York
- Coordinates: 42°23′54″N 74°10′52″W
- Area: 13.7 acres (5.5 ha)
- Built: c. 1799
- Architectural style: Greek Revival
- NRHP reference No.: 10000612
- Added to NRHP: August 30, 2010

Torry-Crittendon Farmhouse is a historic home located at Durham in Greene County, New York. It was built about 1799 and renovated in the Greek Revival style about 1850. It is a 1 1/2-story, heavy timber-frame rectangular house with a central chimney. It is five bays wide and two bays deep on a stone foundation. It was built for William Torry, an American Revolutionary War veteran and one of the town's early settlers. It was purchased by Phares Chittenden in 1830.

It was listed on the National Register of Historic Places in 2010.

== See also ==
- National Register of Historic Places listings in Greene County, New York
