= Charles Pierce House =

Historic house in New York, United States

- U.S. National Register of Historic Places
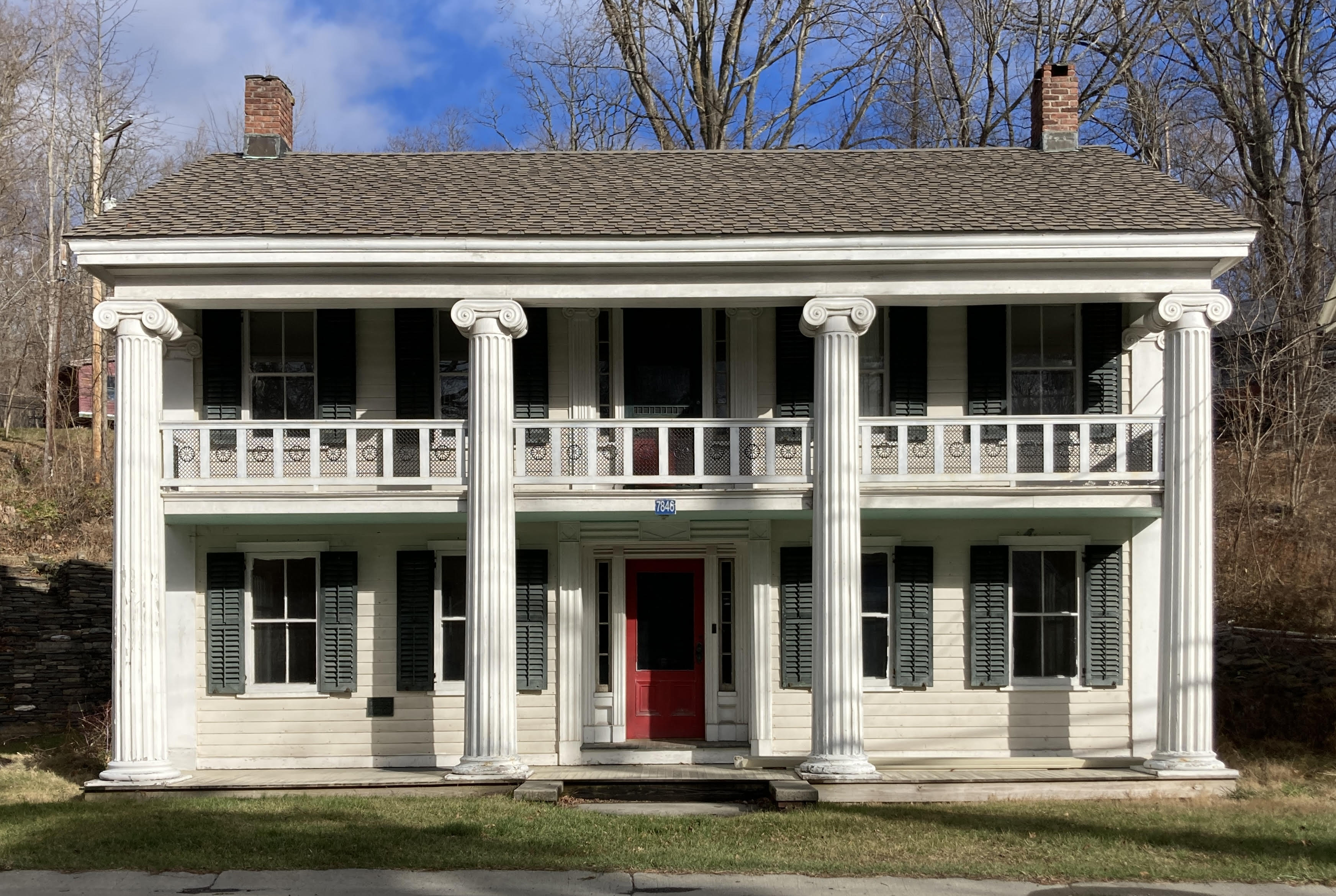
- Charles Pierce House in 2020

- Location within New York Location within the United States
- Location: 7846 NY 81, Durham, New York
- Coordinates: 42°24′41″N 74°9′12″W
- Area: less than one acre
- Built: 1840
- Architectural style: Greek Revival
- NRHP reference No.: 01001386
- Added to NRHP: December 28, 2001

Charles Pierce House is a historic home located the hamlet of Oak Hill in the town of Durham in Greene County, New York. It was built about 1840 and is a two-story, five-by-two-bay, central-hall, double-pile plan frame dwelling. It features a full two-story porch supported by 4 two-story fluted Ionic columns in the Greek Revival style.

It was listed on the National Register of Historic Places in 2001.

== See also ==
- National Register of Historic Places listings in Greene County, New York
