= A. T. House =

Historic house in New York, United States

- U.S. National Register of Historic Places
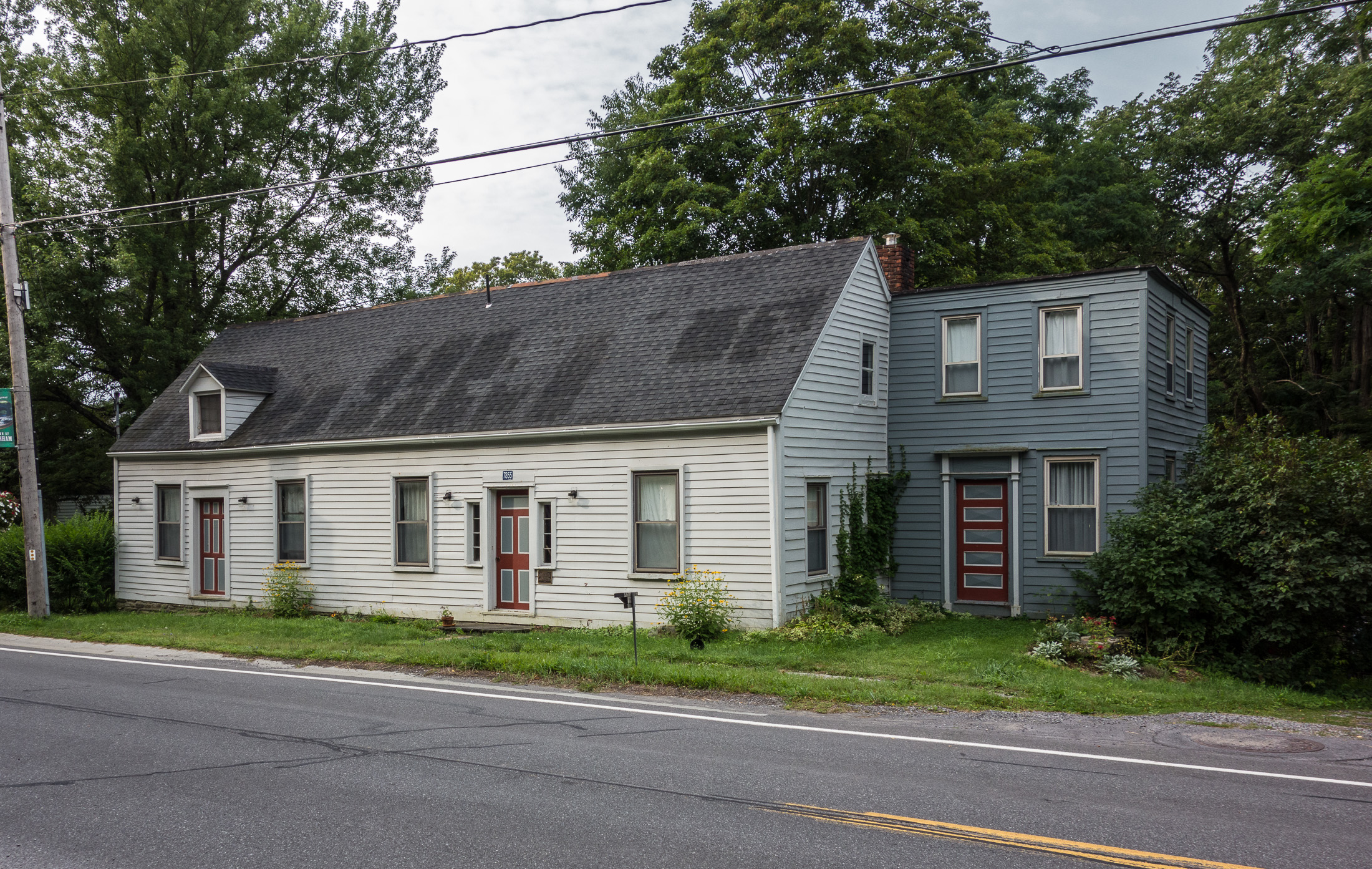
- A. T. House in 2013

- Location within New York Location within the United States
- Location: 435 Main St., Oak Hill, New York
- Coordinates: 42°24′40″N 74°9′14″W
- Area: less than one acre
- Built: 1790
- Architectural style: Federal
- NRHP reference No.: 05001538
- Added to NRHP: January 18, 2006

The A. T. House is a historic house located at 435 Main Street, Oak Hill in Greene County, New York.

== Description and history ==
It was built in three phases: about 1790, about 1795 through 1815, and about 1830. It is a 1 1/2-story and is one of the oldest structures at Oak Hill. Traditional Dutch construction methods were used in the building.

It was listed on the National Register of Historic Places on January 18, 2006.

== See also ==
- National Register of Historic Places listings in Greene County, New York
