= Elijah Strong House =

Historic house in New York, United States

- U.S. National Register of Historic Places
- Location within New York
- Location: 12278 NY 23, Ashland, New York
- Coordinates: 42°18′14″N 74°20′30″W
- Area: less than one acre
- Built: 1797
- Architectural style: Federal, Greek Revival
- NRHP reference No.: 02001711
- Added to NRHP: January 15, 2003

Elijah Strong House is a historic home located at Ashland in Greene County, New York. It was built about 1797 and is a 2-story, two-by-five-bay timber frame dwelling. It rests on a stone foundation and has a moderately pitched gable roof. The interior features a mix of Federal and Greek Revival style elements.

It was listed on the National Register of Historic Places in 2003.

== See also ==
- National Register of Historic Places listings in Greene County, New York
