= Methodist Episcopal Church of Windham Centre =

Historic church in New York, United States

- U.S. National Register of Historic Places
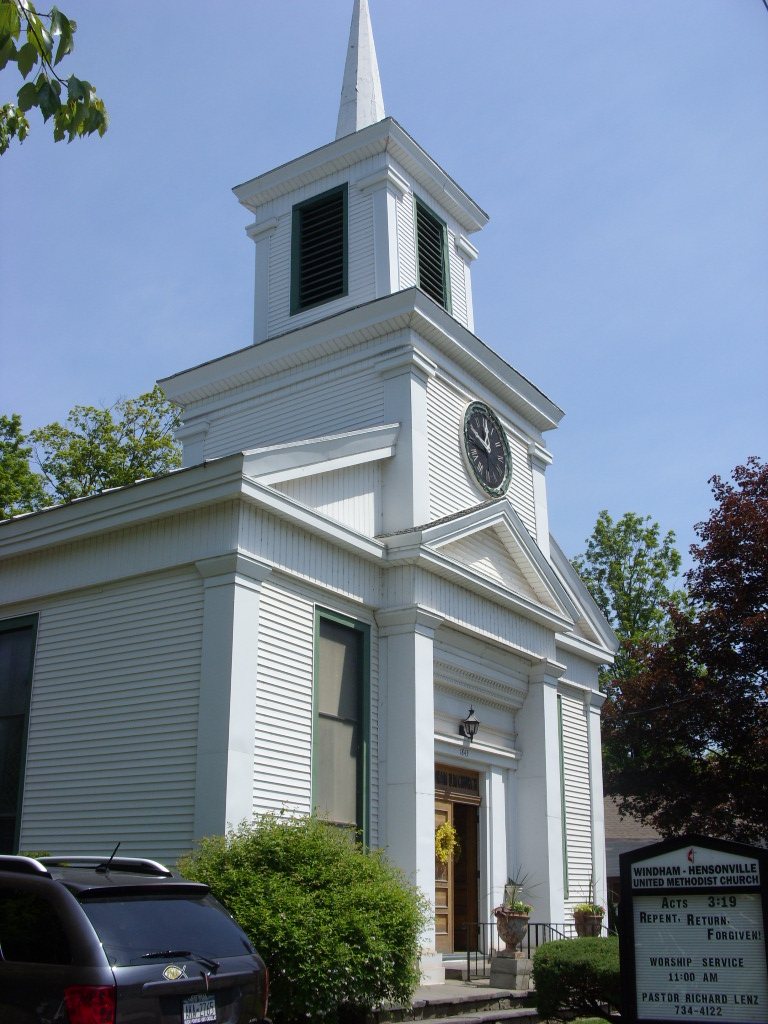
- Methodist Episcopal Church of Windham Centre, July 2009

- Location within New York Location within the United States
- Location: 1843 NY 23, Windham, New York
- Coordinates: 42°18′29″N 74°14′57″W
- Area: 1.5 acres (0.61 ha)
- Built: 1844
- Architectural style: Greek Revival
- NRHP reference No.: 09000255
- Added to NRHP: April 27, 2009

Methodist Episcopal Church of Windham Centre, also known as Windham-Hensonville United Methodist Church, is a historic Methodist Episcopal church on New York State Route 23 in Windham, Greene County, New York. The property includes the church, parsonage, and garage. The church was built in 1844 and is a one-story wood-frame structure in the Greek Revival style. It features a square two stage tower. The parsonage was built in 1902.

It was added to the National Register of Historic Places in 2009.
