= Moore-Howland Estate =

Historic house in New York, United States

- U.S. National Register of Historic Places
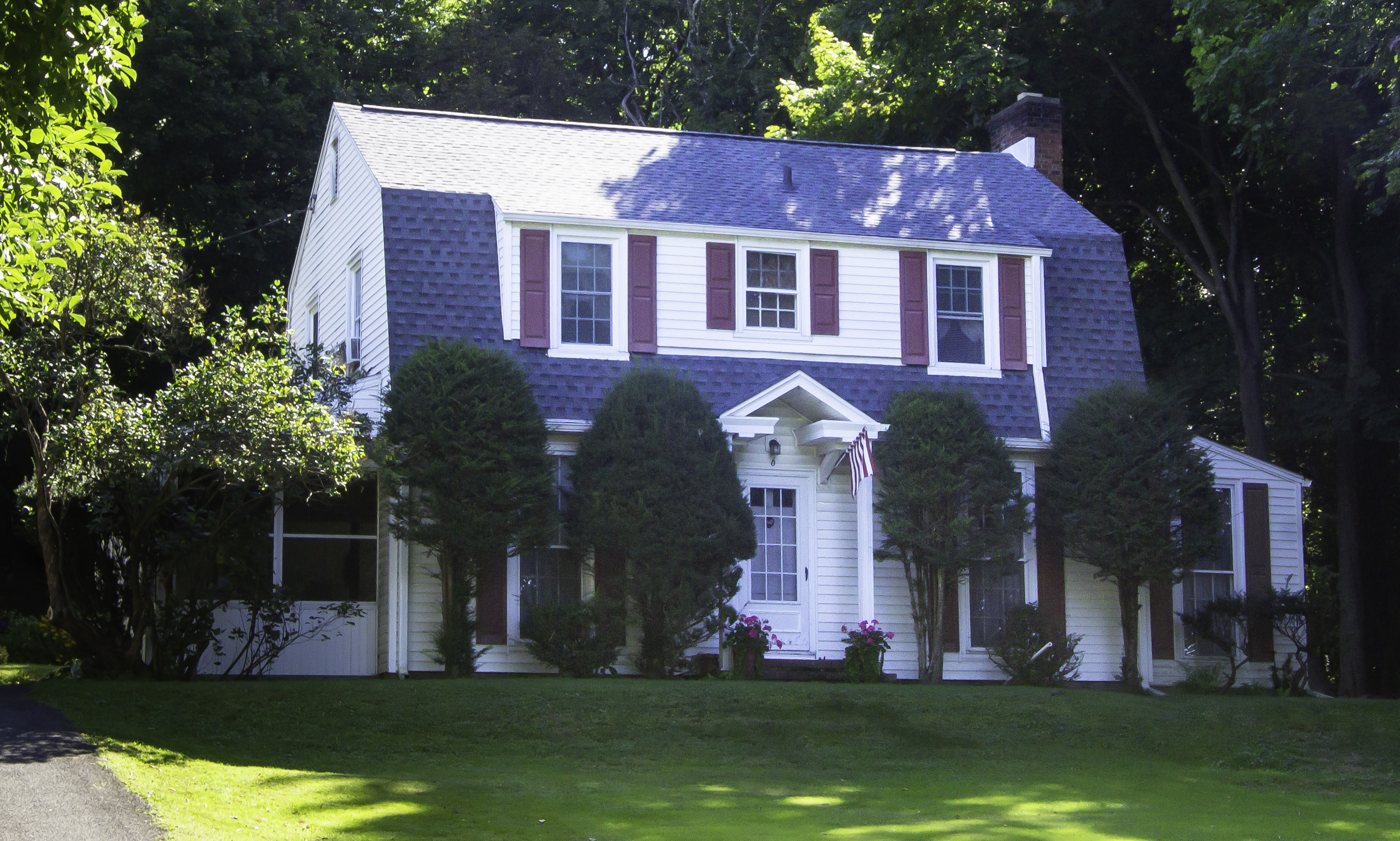

- Location within New York Location within the United States
- Location: 4 New York State Route 385, Catskill, New York
- Coordinates: 42°13′46″N 73°51′27″W
- Area: 23 acres (9.3 ha)
- Built: 1866
- NRHP reference No.: 10000609
- Added to NRHP: August 30, 2010

Moore-Howland Estate is a historic estate complex located at Catskill in Greene County, New York. The property includes a large estate house that was constructed during two major building programs in 1866 and 1900–1901. A number of small additions, alterations, and interior remodeling occurred between the 1920s and the present. It is a long, rambling building, one and one half to two and one half stories tall. The first floor is built of stone, with wood frame and board and batten siding above. There is an octagonal, wood shingled water tower near the northwest corner. In addition to the main house there are seven contributing dependencies: a carriage house, garden house, pump house, tool shed, gazebo, well house, and foundation of an original barn.

It was listed on the National Register of Historic Places in 2010.
