= Joseph Hallock House =

Historic house in New York, United States

- U.S. National Register of Historic Places
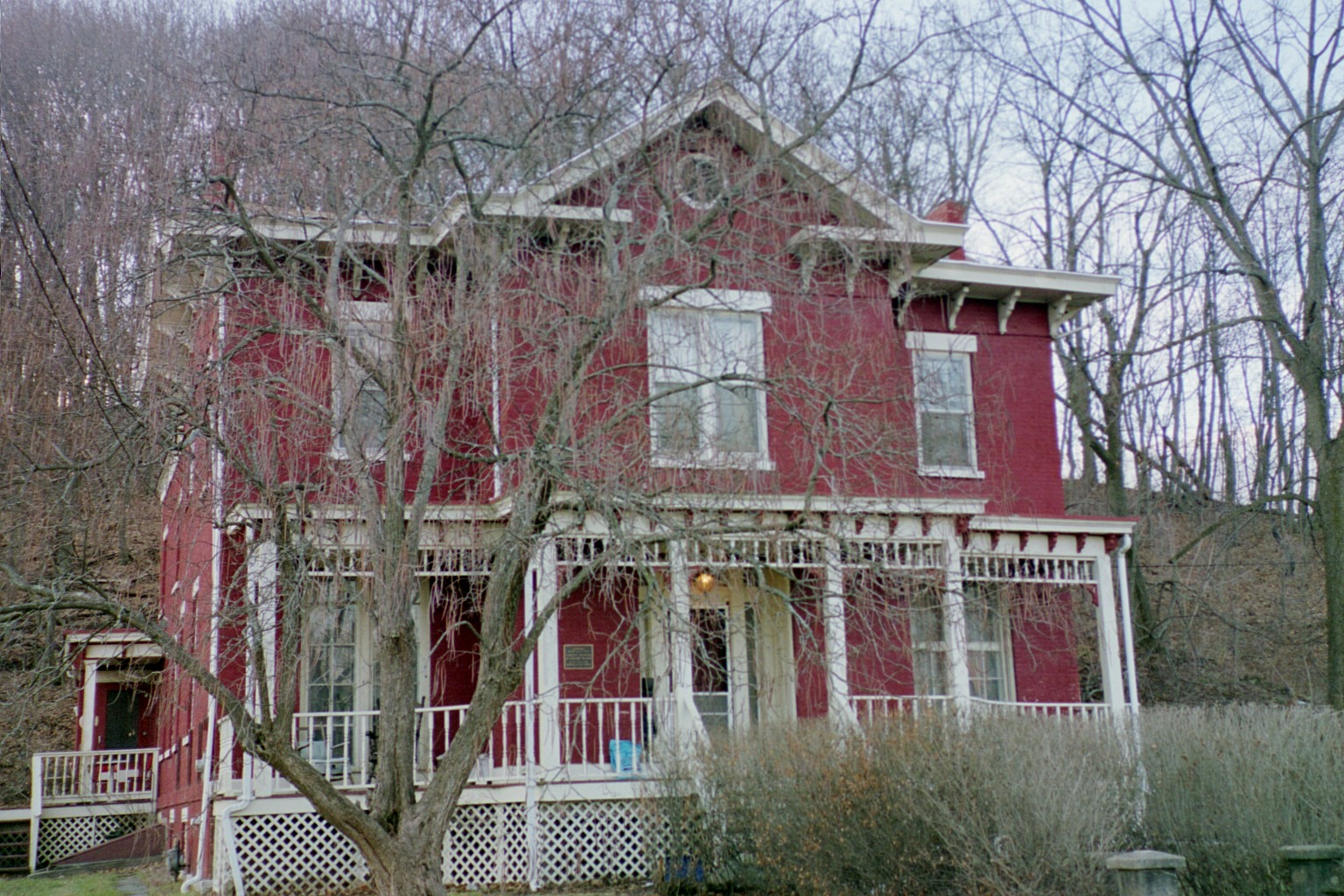
- Joseph Hallock House

- Location within New York Location within the United States
- Location: 241 W. Main St., Catskill, New York
- Coordinates: 42°12′59″N 73°52′8″W
- Built: 1855
- Architectural style: Greek Revival, Italianate
- NRHP reference No.: 95000958
- Added to NRHP: August 10, 1995

The Joseph Hallock House is a historic house located at 241 West Main Street in Catskill, Greene County, New York.

== Description and history ==
built in about 1855, the two-story residence is architecturally significant as a highly intact representation of the mid-nineteenth-century architecture of the town. Its style is transitional, with elements of both Greek Revival and Italianate styles.

It was added to the National Register of Historic Places on August 10, 1995.
