= Prevost Manor House =

Historic house in New York, United States

- U.S. National Register of Historic Places
- Location within New York Location within the United States
- Nearest city: Greenville, New York
- Coordinates: 42°24′50″N 74°3′3″W
- Area: 200 acres (81 ha)
- Built: 1794
- Architect: Lanpher, Fitch
- NRHP reference No.: 72000842
- Added to NRHP: November 15, 1972

Prevost Manor House, also known as Hush-Hush Farm, is a historic home located at Greenville in Greene County, New York. It was built in 1793–1794 and has a 2 1/2-story central block with a 1 1/2-story east wing and single-story rear wings.

It was listed on the National Register of Historic Places in 1972.
