= William Brandow House =

Historic house in New York, United States

- U.S. National Register of Historic Places
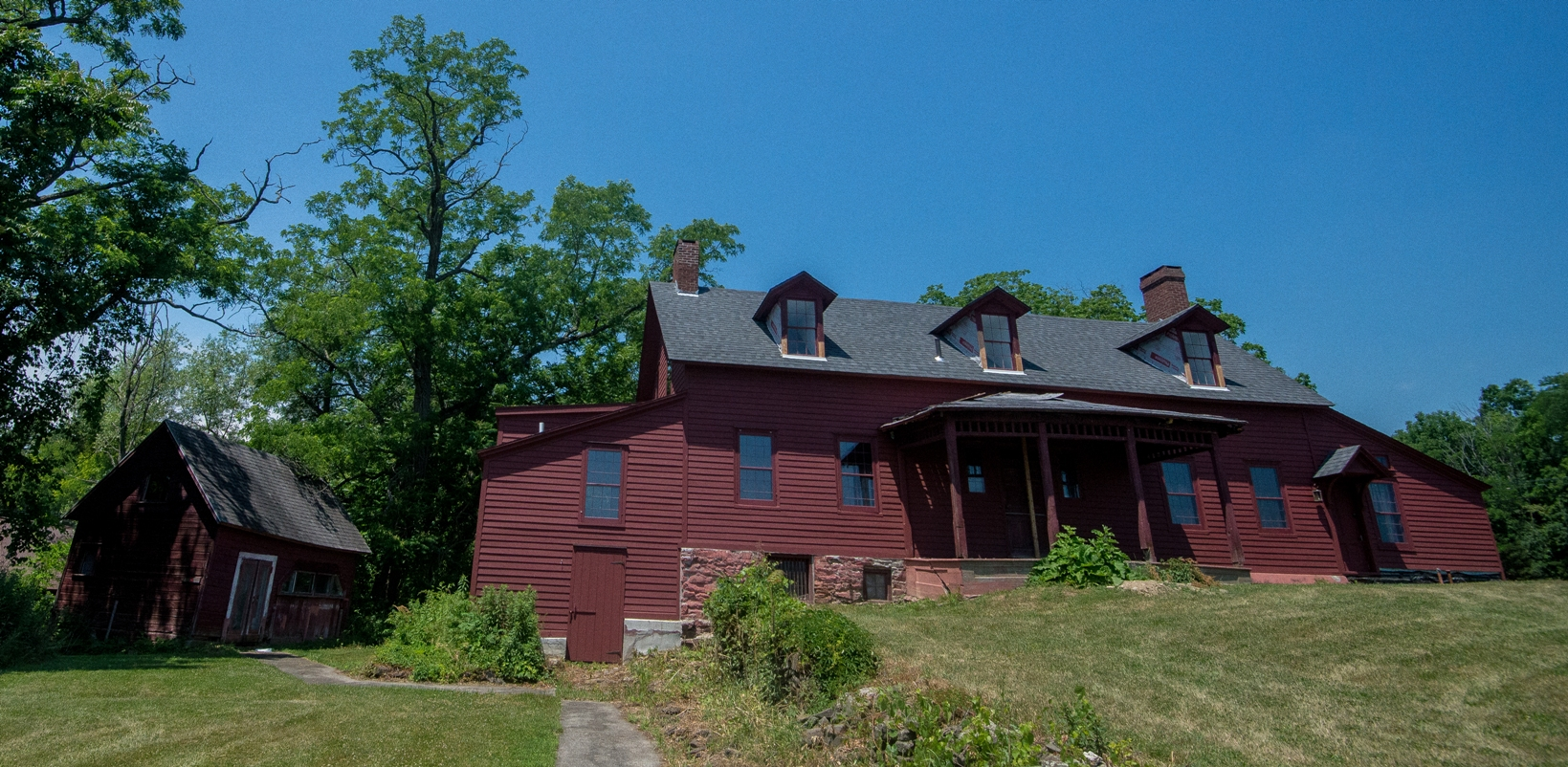

- Location within New York Location within the United States
- Location: 480 Rt. 385, Athens, New York
- Coordinates: 42°15′3.99″N 73°50′5.82″W
- Area: 2.3 acres (0.93 ha)
- Built: c. 1788
- NRHP reference No.: 09000908
- Added to NRHP: November 10, 2009

The William Brandow House (also known as "The Willows") is a historic house located at 480 Route 385 in Athens, Greene County, New York.

== Description and history ==
It was built in about 1788 and is a 1 1/2-story, rectangular frame dwelling with a gabled roof. Significant modifications were made in the late 19th century in the Victorian style and early 20th century in the Colonial Revival style. It retains its original Dutch split entry door.

It was listed on the National Register of Historic Places on November 10, 2009.
