= Croswell-Parsons Paper Mill Ruin =

- U.S. National Register of Historic Places
- Location within New York Location within the United States
- Location: NY 144, New Baltimore, New York
- Area: less than one acre
- Built: 1815
- NRHP reference No.: 07001366
- Added to NRHP: January 9, 2008

Croswell-Parsons Paper Mill Ruin is the historic remains of an industrial structure and archaeological site located at New Baltimore in Greene County, New York.

It was listed on the National Register of Historic Places in 1996.
