= Leeds Flat Site =

- U.S. National Register of Historic Places
- Nearest city: Catskill, New York
- Area: 19.9 acres (8.1 ha)
- NRHP reference No.: 98001223
- Added to NRHP: October 1, 1998

Leeds Flat Site is an archaeological site located at Catskill in Greene County, New York.

It was listed on the National Register of Historic Places in 1998.
