= Harry Fischel House =

Historic house in New York, United States

- U.S. National Register of Historic Places
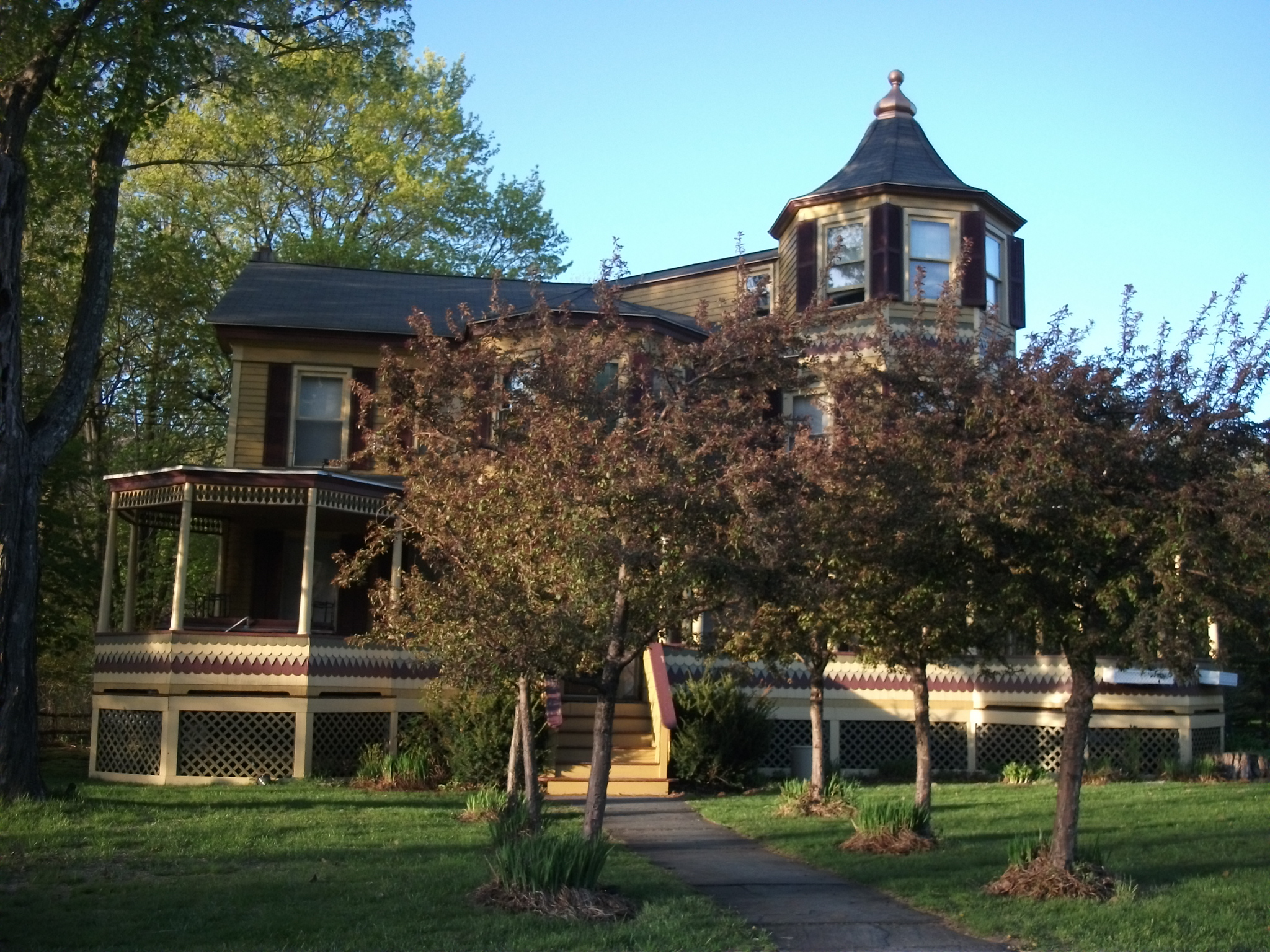
- Harry Fischel House, May 2011

- Location within New York Location within the United States
- Location: 6302 Main St., Hunter, New York
- Coordinates: 42°12′40″N 74°12′56″W
- Area: 2.8 acres (1.1 ha)
- Built: 1840
- Architectural style: Greek Revival, Queen Anne
- NRHP reference No.: 00000348
- Added to NRHP: April 21, 2000

Harry Fischel House, also known as Fairlawn, is a historic home located at Hunter in Greene County, New York. It was built about 1840 and substantially enlarged in 1904. It is a 2 1/2-story, five-by-two-bay, Queen Anne–style dwelling with a 2-story, eight-by-one-bay rear wing. It features a 2-story, engaged corner tower and single-story verandah.

It was listed on the National Register of Historic Places in 2000.
