= Weldon House =

- U.S. National Register of Historic Places
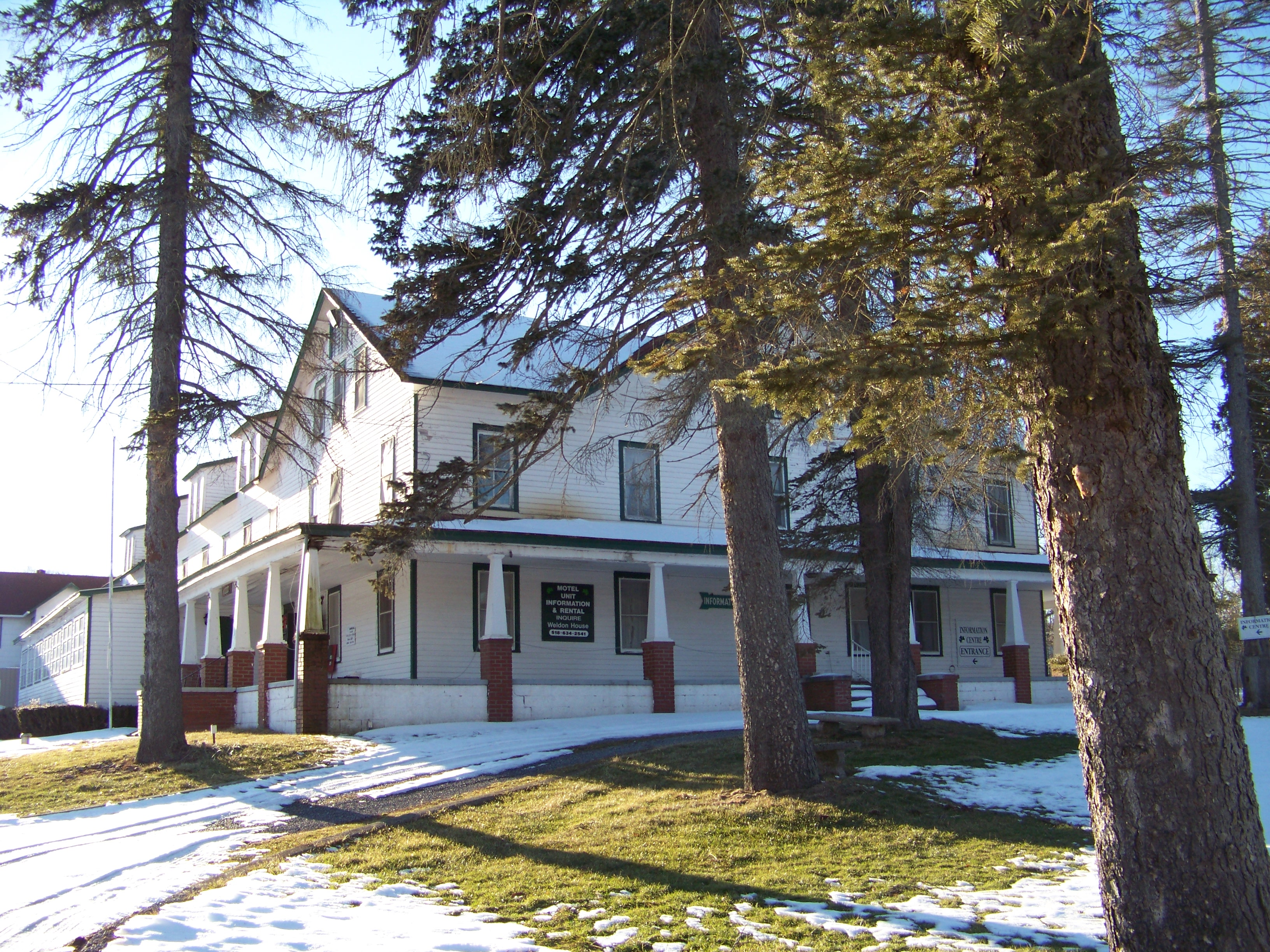
- Weldon House, April 2010

- Location within New York Location within the United States
- Location: NY 145, East Durham, New York
- Coordinates: 42°21′55″N 74°4′53″W
- Area: 3 acres (1.2 ha)
- Built: 1923
- NRHP reference No.: 99001658
- Added to NRHP: January 7, 2000

Weldon House is a historic hotel located at East Durham in Greene County, New York. It was built in 1923 it is a two-story frame building with a main section measuring 58 feet by 31 feet, (18 meter by 9½ meters) and a rear ell measuring 58 feet by 27 feet (18 meters by 8 meters). It features a broad verandah along three sides of the main section. Additions were completed in about 1945 and 1965. The structure contains 60 guest rooms that could house up to 140 guests. Also located on the property is the owners residence / laundry, stable, small kiosks, pump houses, and storage huts.

It was listed on the National Register of Historic Places in 2000.
