= Wiley Hose Company Building =

- U.S. National Register of Historic Places
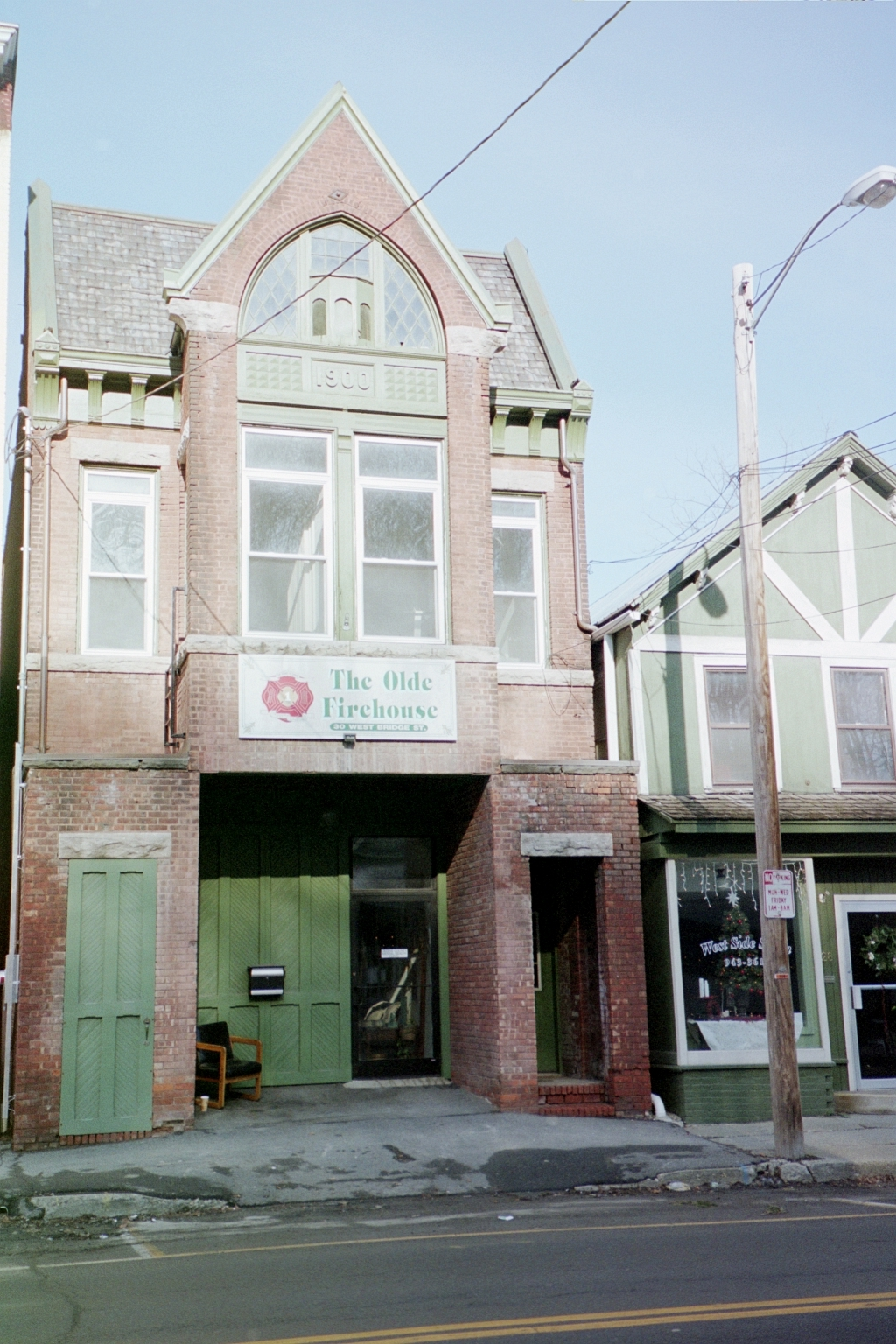

- Location within New York Location within the United States
- Location: 30 West Bridge Street, Catskill, New York
- Coordinates: 42°13′1″N 73°52′9″W
- Built: 1900
- Architectural style: Queen Anne
- NRHP reference No.: 95000962
- Added to NRHP: August 10, 1995

The Wiley Hose Company Building is located in Catskill, New York. The three-story, brick building is a representative example of a turn-of-the-century firehouse. It was built in 1900 by George W. Holdridge, a local builder. The brick was produced in the Catskill area, and is complemented by stone and terra cotta detailing. The firehouse was altered somewhat around 1930 to accommodate the newer, larger mechanized fire equipment that replaced horse-drawn and smaller mechanized equipment. The matching entry porticos on either side were added at this time, and the wooden flooring in the equipment bay was replaced with concrete.

The West Catskill fire district served by this firehouse was founded in 1855. At that time, it was called the West Catskill Fire Company. In 1893, the company was renamed after the owner of the Kaatskill Knitting Company, General W.S.C. Wiley. In 1902 it was renamed again and subsequently called Hose Company No. 1. The building was used as an active firehouse until 1971.

The Wiley Hose Company was added to the National Register of Historic Places in 1995.
