= Henry T. Botsford House =

Historic house in New York, United States

- U.S. National Register of Historic Places
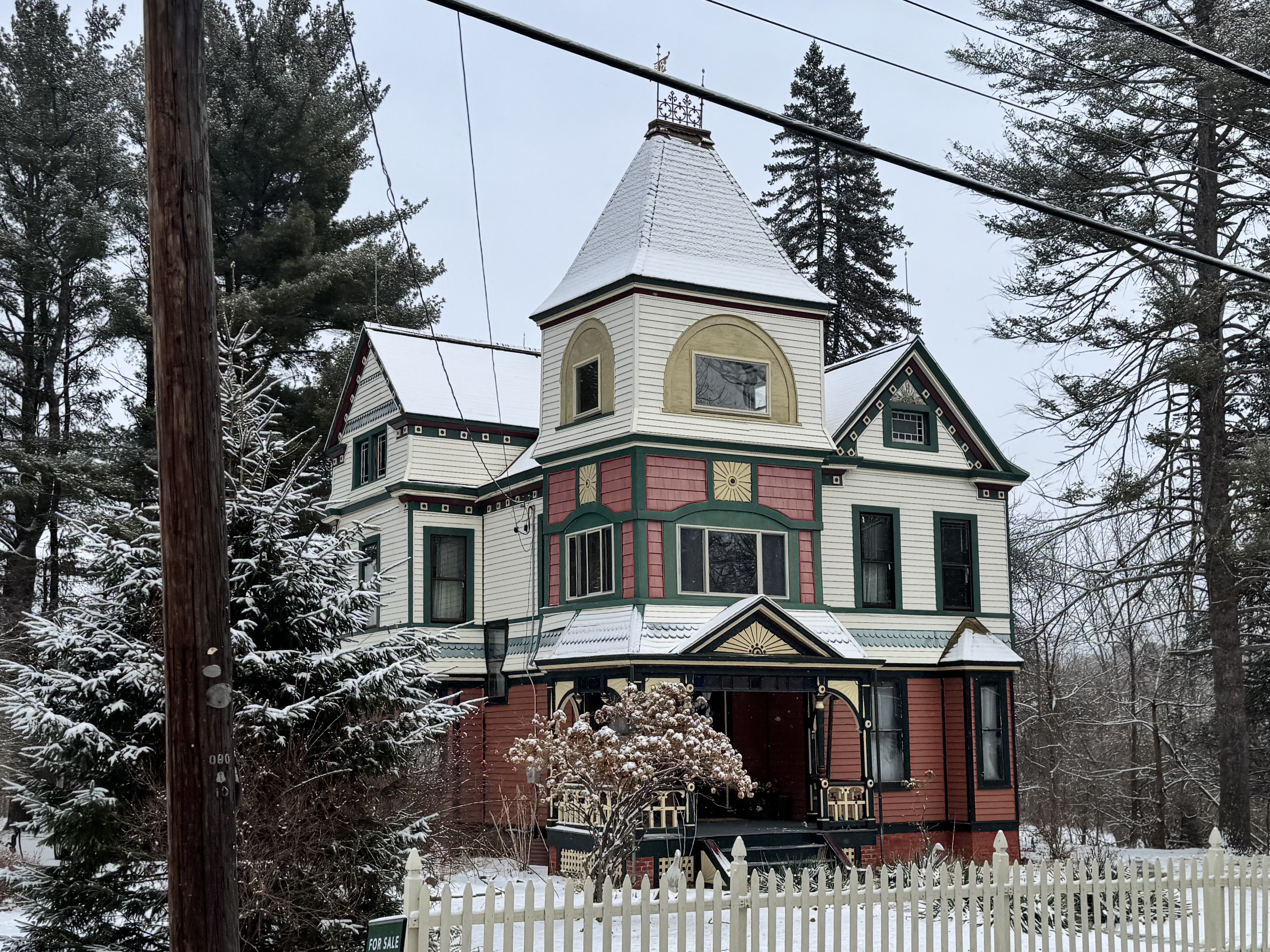

- Location within New York Location within the United States
- Location: NY 81 W of jct. with NY 32, Greenville, New York
- Coordinates: 42°24′57″N 74°1′32″W
- Area: 2.7 acres (1.1 ha)
- Built: 1891
- Architect: Craw, Charles Willis
- Architectural style: Queen Anne
- NRHP reference No.: 93001224
- Added to NRHP: November 12, 1993

Henry T. Botsford House is a historic house located at Greenville in Greene County, New York.

== Description and history ==
It was built in 1891 and is a three-story, irregularly massed Queen Anne style frame structure on a brick faced stone foundation. It features an engaged square corner tower. Also on the property is a carriage house built in 1894.

It was listed on the National Register of Historic Places on November 12, 1993.
