= District School No. 11 =

- U.S. National Register of Historic Places
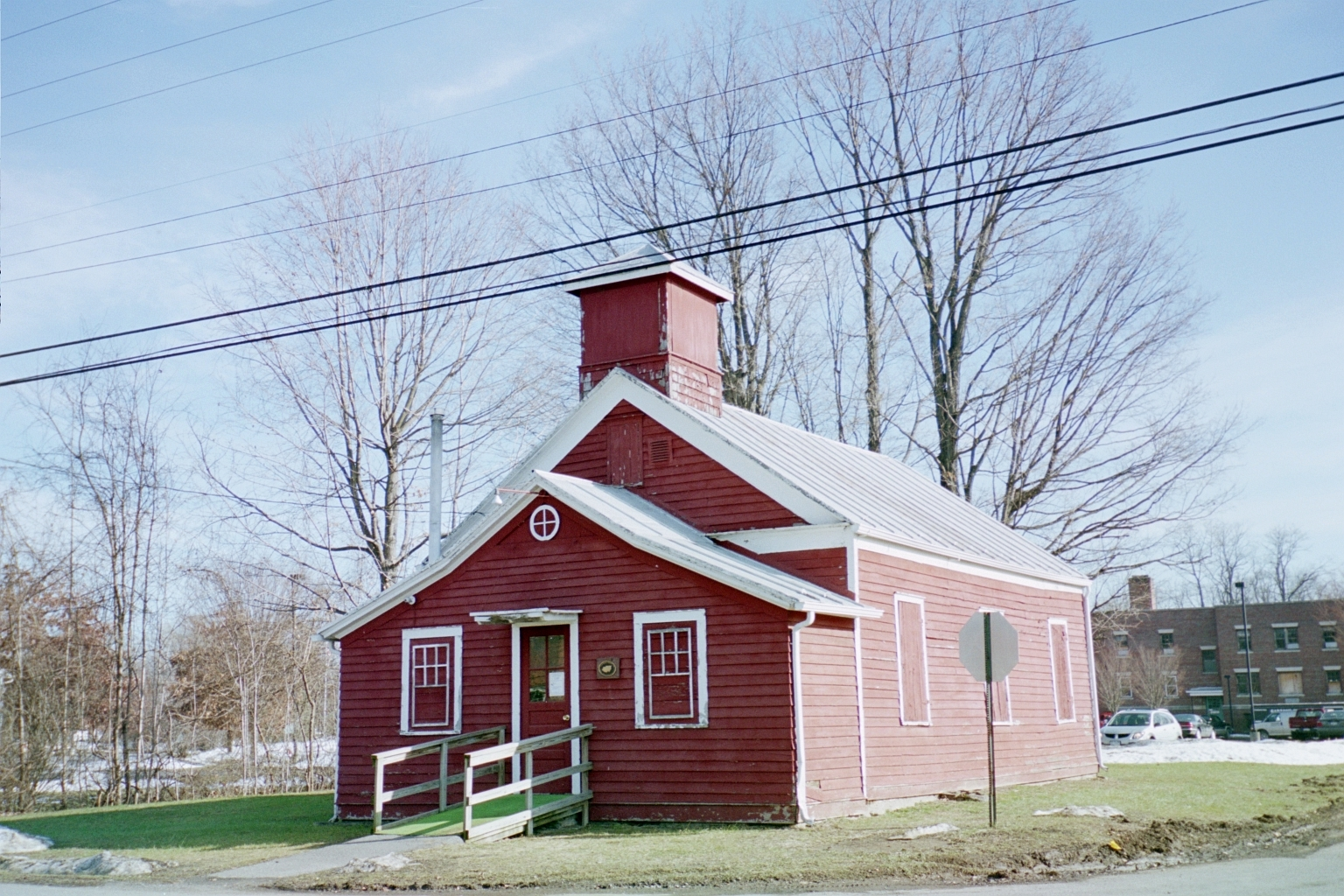

- Location within New York Location within the United States
- Location: Catskill, New York
- Coordinates: 42°13′51″N 73°52′51″W
- Built: 1833
- Architectural style: Greek Revival
- NRHP reference No.: 95000964
- Added to NRHP: August 10, 1995

District School No. 11 is located on South Jefferson Avenue in Catskill, New York. It was built in 1833, with an addition added around 1855. It was operated continuously as a school until 1948. The school was added to the National Register of Historic Places in 1995.

This school is an exemplary representation of the one-room school house prevalent in rural New York State in the nineteenth century. In its original form, it was one large room, with three windows along each side. The windows all have operational wooden shutters. The school is built of wood, on a stone foundation. The original building is topped by a belfry with a pyramidal roof.

The town of Catskill was split into sixteen districts in the early part of the nineteenth century. In the early days of the school's history, twenty-five students attended the school.

In the mid-nineteenth century, New York State implemented school reforms intended to improve public education. One of these reforms was the physical change of the addition of a vestibule to the one-room schoolhouse, in order to set the learning area apart and reduce drafts. Such a vestibule was added to this building in approximately 1855.
