= Mrs. Osburn House =

Historic house in New York, United States

- U.S. National Register of Historic Places
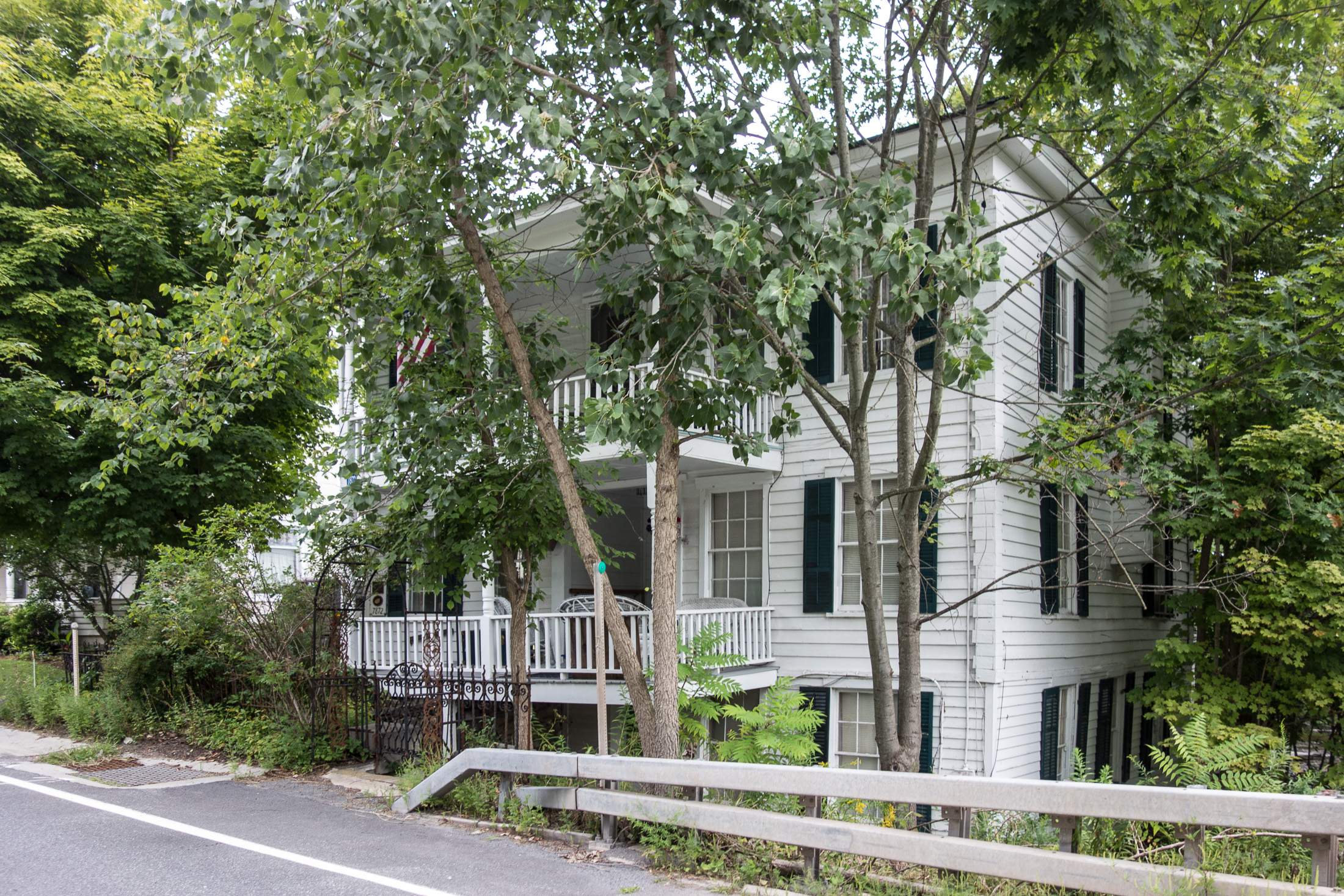
- Mrs. Osburn House in 2013

- Location within New York Location within the United States
- Location: 7872 NY 81, Durham, New York
- Coordinates: 42°24′43″N 74°9′16″W
- Area: less than one acre
- Built: 1850
- Architectural style: Greek Revival
- NRHP reference No.: 01001390
- Added to NRHP: December 28, 2001

The Mrs. Osburn House is a historic home located in Durham, Greene County, New York. It was built about 1850 and is a five-by-three-bay timber frame dwelling. It features clapboard siding and a low-pitched hipped roof. Also on the property is a heavy-timber-frame barn.

It was listed on the National Register of Historic Places in 2001.
