= Reed Street Historic District =

Historic district in New York, United States

- U.S. National Register of Historic Places
- U.S. Historic district
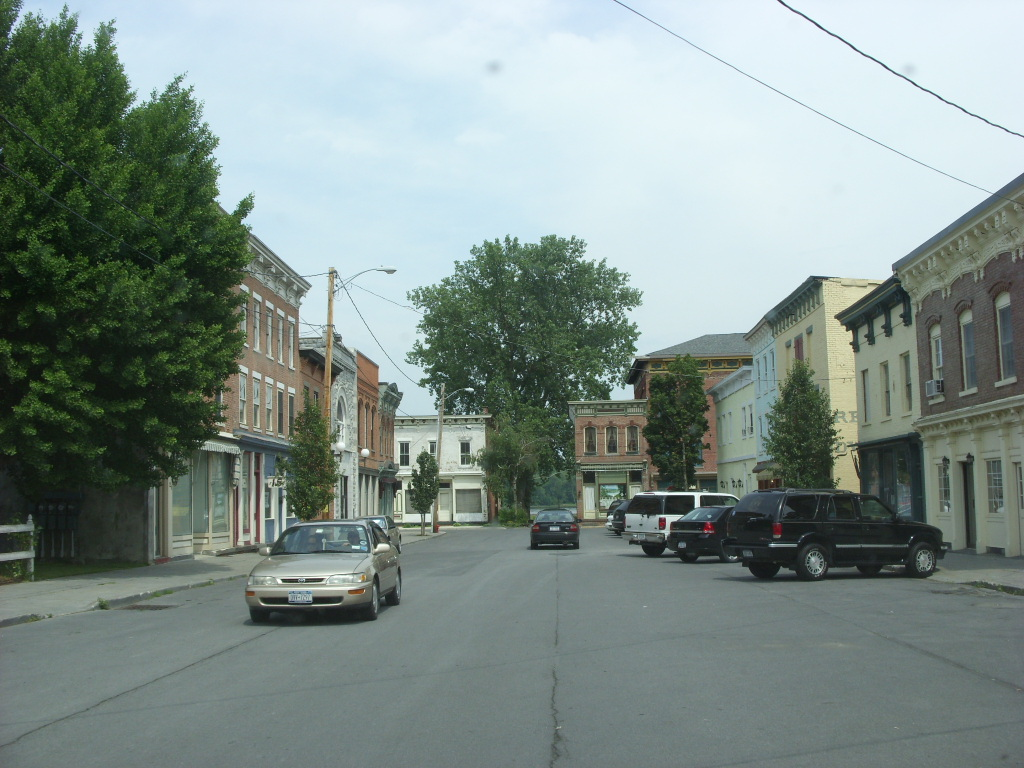
- Reed Street Historic District, July 2008

- Location within New York Location within the United States
- Location: Reed, Ely, Mansion, and River Sts., Coxsackie, New York
- Coordinates: 42°21′6″N 73°47′50″W
- Area: 8 acres (3.2 ha)
- Built: 1810
- Architect: Multiple
- Architectural style: Greek Revival, Italianate, Federal
- NRHP reference No.: 80002621
- Added to NRHP: May 6, 1980

Reed Street Historic District is a national historic district located at Coxsackie in Greene County, New York. The district contains 30 contributing buildings. They are a collection of mid-19th century, two and three story commercial buildings. The district displays a uniformity of style in its Italianate style brick facades with ornate brackets and overhanging eaves. It also includes three late Federal style residences.

It was listed on the National Register of Historic Places in 1980.
