= Flint Mine Hill Archeological District =

Historic district in New York, United States

- U.S. National Register of Historic Places
- U.S. Historic district
- Nearest city: Coxsackie, New York
- Area: 1,835 acres (743 ha)
- NRHP reference No.: 78001852
- Added to NRHP: November 29, 1978

Flint Mine Hill Archeological District is an archaeological site and national historic district located at Coxsackie in Greene County, New York.

It was listed on the National Register of Historic Places in 1978.
