= The Parsonage (Oak Hill, New York) =

Historic house in New York, United States

- U.S. National Register of Historic Places
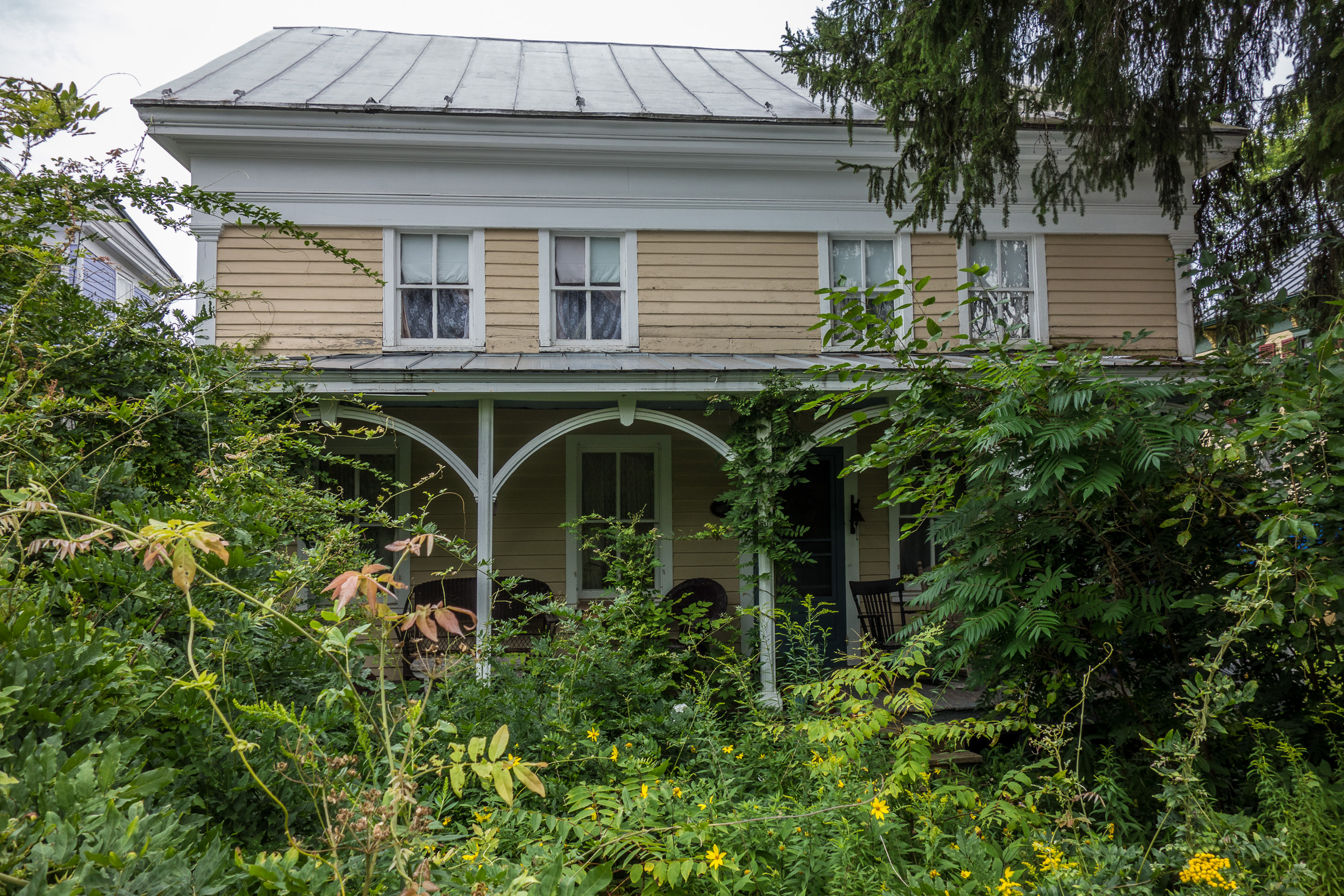
- The Parsonage in 2013

- Location within New York Location within the United States
- Location: 424 Main St., Oak Hill, New York
- Coordinates: 42°24′45″N 74°9′21″W
- Area: less than one acre
- Built: ca. 1815
- Architectural style: Picturesque
- NRHP reference No.: 05000262
- Added to NRHP: April 6, 2005

The Parsonage is a historic home located at Oak Hill in Greene County, New York. The house was built about 1815 and is a two-story, heavy timber framed, five bay gable roofed dwelling modified about 1840 and about 1870. Also on the property is a carriage barn with board and batten siding. From 1868 to 1973 it served as the parsonage for the nearly Methodist Episcopal church.

It was listed on the National Register of Historic Places in 2005.

== See also ==
- National Register of Historic Places listings in Greene County, New York
