= Frank D. Layman Memorial =

- U.S. National Register of Historic Places
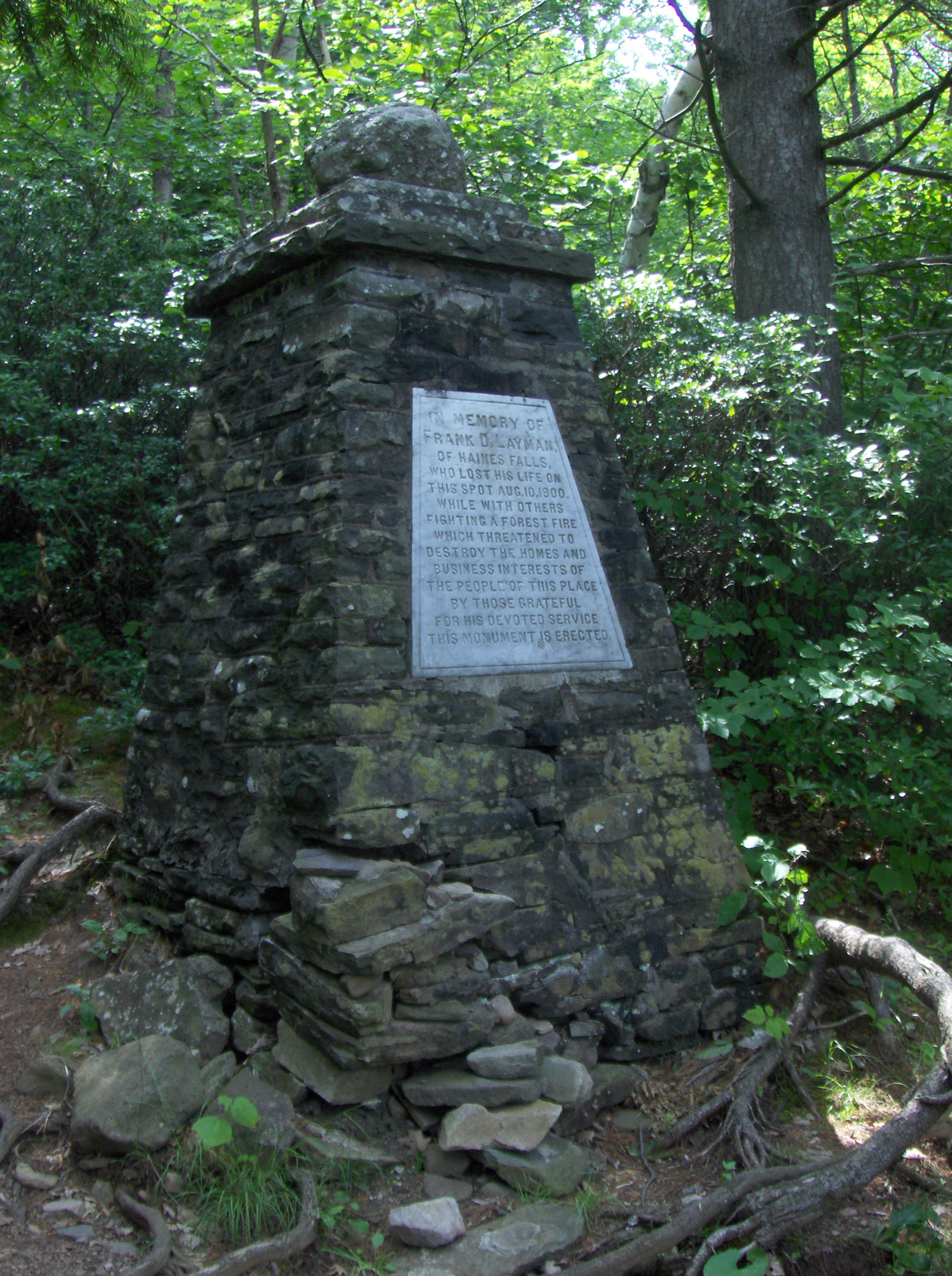
- Frank D. Layman Memorial, July 2008

- Location within New York Location within the United States
- Nearest city: Hunter, New York
- Coordinates: 42°11′24″N 74°3′55″W
- Area: less than one acre
- Built: 1901
- NRHP reference No.: 03000022
- Added to NRHP: June 6, 2003

Frank D. Layman Memorial is a historic monument located at Hunter in Greene County, New York. It was erected in 1901 to commemorate Frank D. Layman, who died on the site of the memorial on August 10, 1900, while fighting a forest fire. It is pyramidal in shape, four sided, and rises upward from a base approximately seven feet in diameter to approximately 11 feet.

It was listed on the National Register of Historic Places in 2003.
