= Morss Homestead/Federal City Homestead =

Historic house in New York, United States

- U.S. National Register of Historic Places
- Location within New York Location within the United States
- Location: NY 23, Red Falls, New York
- Coordinates: 42°18′35″N 74°23′45″W
- Area: 6 acres (2.4 ha)
- Built: 1820
- Architects: Morss, Burton G.
- Architectural style: Greek Revival
- NRHP reference No.: 83001680
- Added to NRHP: September 30, 1983

Morss Homestead/Federal City Homestead is a historic home and farm complex located at Red Falls in Greene County, New York, United States. The house was built about 1830 and is a Greek Revival style dwelling. Also on the property are a barn, carriage house, and privy.

It was listed on the National Register of Historic Places in 1983.
