= Van Bergen House =

Historic house in New York, United States

- U.S. National Register of Historic Places
- Location within New York Location within the United States
- Location: Jct. of NY 9W and Schiller Park Rd., New Baltimore, New York
- Coordinates: 42°23′4″N 73°50′4″W
- Area: 6 acres (2.4 ha)
- Built: 1786
- Architect: Houghtaling, Thomas
- Architectural style: Classical Revival, Federal
- NRHP reference No.: 91000444
- Added to NRHP: April 25, 1991

Van Bergen House is a historic home located at New Baltimore in Greene County, New York. It was built about 1786 (expanded about 1820) and is a two-story, four by five bay stubblestone residence with a slate-clad hipped roof. It was restored in the mid-20th century. Also on the property is a smoke house.

It was listed on the National Register of Historic Places in 1991.
