= Jewett Presbyterian Church Complex =

Historic church in New York, United States

- U.S. National Register of Historic Places
- Location within New York Location within the United States
- Location: Church St., Jewett, New York
- Coordinates: 42°16′12″N 74°18′15″W
- Area: less than one acre
- Built: 1848
- Architectural style: Greek Revival
- NRHP reference No.: 01001382
- Added to NRHP: December 28, 2001

Jewett Presbyterian Church Complex is a historic Presbyterian church on Church Street in Jewett, Greene County, New York. The complex consists of the 1848 Jewett Presbyterian Church and adjacent 1848 former Methodist Episcopal Church. The Jewett Presbyterian Church is a two-story, four by three bay timber-framed building sheathed in clapboard and topped by a gable roof. The former Methodist Episcopal Church was built using a one-story, four by three bay plan and features a moderately pitched gable roof. Both structures feature Greek Revival design elements.

It was added to the National Register of Historic Places in 2001.
