= L.E. Cleveland House =

Historic house in New York, United States

- U.S. National Register of Historic Places
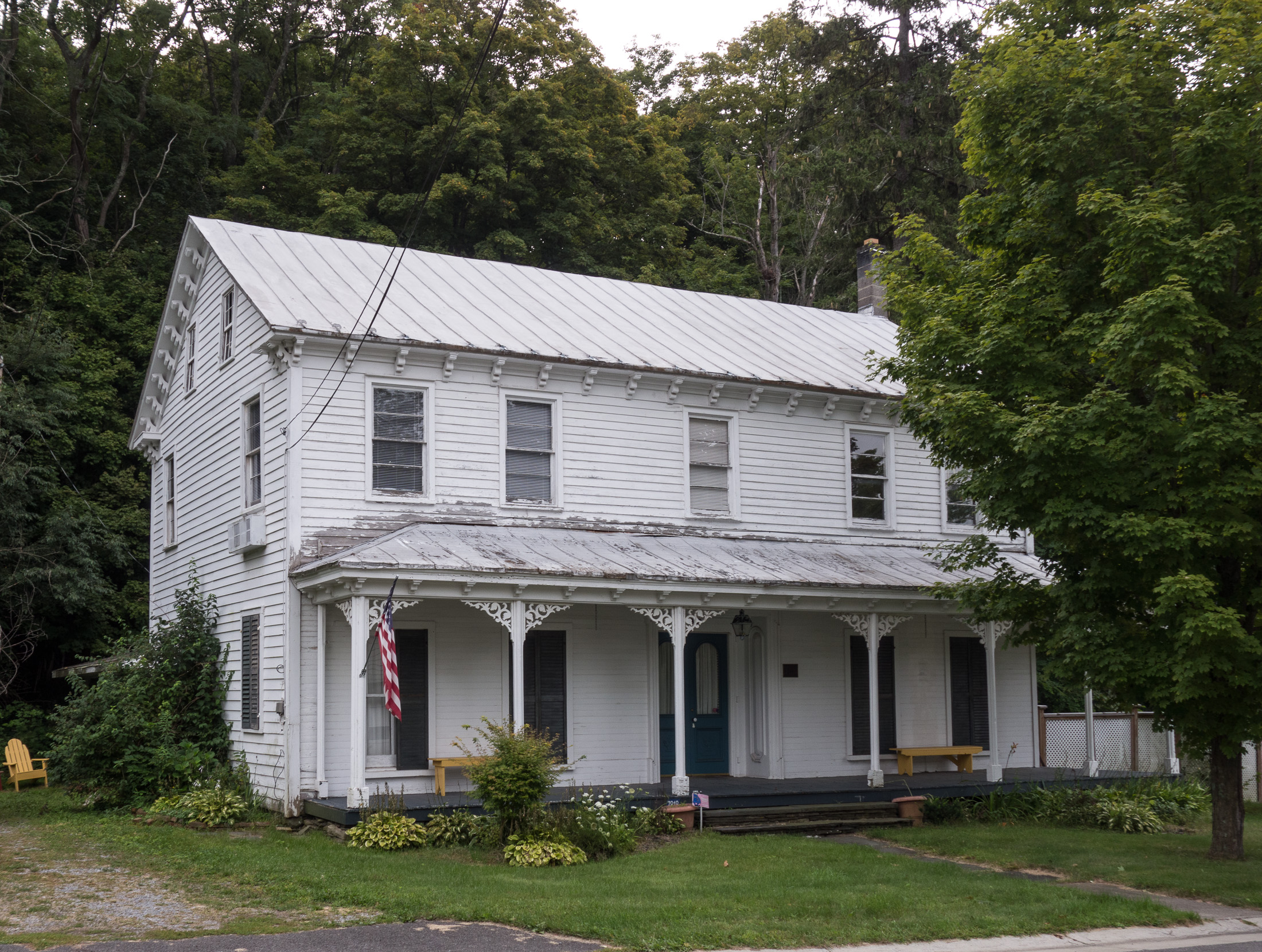
- L. E. Cleveland House in 2013

- Location within New York Location within the United States
- Location: 7818 NY 81, Durham, New York
- Coordinates: 42°24′38″N 74°9′10″W
- Area: less than one acre
- Built: 1790
- Architectural style: Greek Revival
- NRHP reference No.: 01001385
- Added to NRHP: December 28, 2001

L.E. Cleveland House is a historic home located at Durham in Greene County, New York. The original section was built in 1790 and is a two-story, five by two bay, central hall, single pile plan frame dwelling.

It was listed on the National Register of Historic Places in 2001.
