= Rushmore Farm =

Historic house in New York, United States

- U.S. National Register of Historic Places
- Location within New York Location within the United States
- Location: 8748 US 9W, Athens, New York
- Coordinates: 42°20′5.05″N 73°50′57.68″W
- Area: 95.0 acres (38.4 ha)
- Architectural style: Greek Revival
- NRHP reference No.: 10000364
- Added to NRHP: June 18, 2010

Rushmore Farm is a historic home located at Athens in Greene County, New York. It is a 1 1/2-story, six-bay-wide by two-bay-deep stone dwelling surmounted by a steep gable roof. It was built in two sections during the late 18th century and early 19th century and features an overlay of Greek Revival details. Also on the property is a contributing stone smokehouse.

It was listed on the National Register of Historic Places in 2010.

== Location & Description ==
Rushmore Farm is located in the town of Athens, near the eastern border of Greene County, The ninety-five acre farm is a long and narrow parcel of land generally bordered by two major north–south transportation features: US 9W on the west and the Conrail railroad tracks on the east. Both of these routes parallel the Hudson River, which is east of the tracks. The nominated property is characterized by woodland, mature trees, a pond, and a landscaped yard. Its highest elevation is along the western boundary, while the land drops off sharply to the east, toward the flats along the river. To the north/northeast of the farm are the Athens Flats; known to be a Native American area used for feeding and watering animals on the way to the Hudson River from the flint ridge located to the northwest/west of the house. A small portion of the Athens Flats is located on this property. The Rushmore property was once much larger, and the nominated ninety-five acre parcel has been defined by numerous land transactions from the late 18th century until the 1970s, when it reached its current size. Much of the original acreage outside the nomination boundary is still actively farmed. Land in the Athens Flats too wet for farming remains uncultivated. Some of the former property along US 9W has been divided off and developed with residences and commercial properties. An easement to the New York Power and Light Company (now National Grid) cuts through the northeast comer of the property. The Rushmore graveyard, a non-contiguous parcel owned by Greene County, is located south of the property along the edge of US 9W and is separated from the farm by intermediate development. The cemetery is not included in this nomination.

The entrance to the property is a long gravel driveway from US 9W leading to the building complex, which is located in a small landscaped clearing. Buildings include a stone farmhouse, an early stone smokehouse, a non-historic wood-frame garage, and a small non-historic shed built on the footprint of an earlier milk house. In the fields to the southwest of the house are foundations of a silo and a barn. The latter have not been evaluated for their archeological potential. There is a large stand of locust trees east of the house. The nomination includes two contributing and two non-contributing features. The foundations have not been counted.

=== The Rushmore Farm House ===
The Rushmore farmhouse is a 1 1/2-story, six-bay-wide by two-bay-deep stone residence surmounted by a steeply pitched gable roof. Interior stone chimneys pierce the gable ends. The residence, which faces south, was built in two sections, in the late 18th century and early 19th century, and features an overlay of Greek Revival period decoration. The house was built into the side of a hill so that the southeast face of the basement is exposed. The building was constructed of uncoursed fieldstone with a mortar joint that was tooled to obtain a distinctive V-shaped pattern. The façade appears to have been whitewashed at one time and there are large areas where the original mortar has been replaced with Portland cement. The house features a standing-seam metal roof, overhanging eaves, a projecting wood cornice with returns, and a wide wooden frieze. Two gabled dormers on the south elevation were added at a later, unknown date.

The western half of the house was built first and apparently dates to the last quarter of the 18th century. The original structure was three bays wide with a center entrance. A seam near the center of the north and south walls denotes the end of the original house. The eastern half, which was built in the early 19th century, is three bays wide with an entrance in its westernmost bay. This section also features a basement kitchen, with access from underneath the front porch. A full-width porch apparently added in the mid-19th century is supported by flat, paneled posts and features a wood railing. A wood stair leads to the entrance to the west section. At one time part of the porch was screened in; however, all of the screening has been removed.

The exposed section of the basement is concealed by lattice screening. The west half of the facade features a wide, wood-panel door within a wood enframement flanked by double-hung, eight-over-twelve wood-frame windows. In the east section, a similar door has a single sidelight to the east and two double-hung, twelve-over-twelve wood-frame windows in the easternmost bays. The east and west elevations each feature one window in the south bay of the first story and two windows in the half story. On the west (side) elevation, the first story contains a double-hung, two-over-two wood-frame window, the upper story windows are smaller but have the same configuration. On the east (side) elevation, the first story features a double-hung, twelve-over-twelve wood-frame window that matches the façade windows in this section. Half story windows on the east elevation are double hung with six-over-six sash. There is a small basement window on this elevation. A large vertical crack, which has been repaired, runs through east wall, from the roof to the ground, following the location of the interior chimney.

Fenestration on the rear (north) elevation is irregular. The western (original) half of the building contains two widely spaced, double-hung, eight-over-eight wood-frame windows on the first story and one small rectangular eight-pane window centered in the half story. The eastern half features a single wood-panel door and a double-hung, twelve-over-twelve wood-frame window on the first story and a small rectangular six-pane wood-frame window above. There is also a small basement window on the east side.

The interior plan of the original (western) section has been altered since its original construction. The first floor is divided into four spaces, with a living room occupying the western two-thirds and a kitchen, laundry, and half-bath in the eastern third. An enclosed staircase is located along the west wall of the living room, along with built-in cabinets and a rebuilt fireplace with a wide wooden mantel and a narrow shelf. The trim around the fireplace and windows appears to be original and is in keeping with a late 18th-century construction date; windows contain original glass. The western room features exposed small-dimensioned hand-hewn beams running north–south and a single large summer beam running east–west. The latter was added in the 1970s to provide structural support and probably compensated for the loss of an original east–west that would have divided the room into two spaces, with the larger, southern room serving as the kitchen and the smaller, northern room containing the entrance to the enclosed stair. The original beams in both rooms would have been concealed by a plaster ceiling. Finishes and trim in the kitchen and laundry are similar to those in the living room. It is possible that a chimney was originally located on the east wall of the original house; this would have been removed when the house was enlarged, and there is no evidence of it today.

The eastern section of the first floor is divided into a hall and "best room" (now the dining room), which may be the original configuration. The hall contains an enclosed stair leading to the upper floor and a stairway to the basement, which was the location of the kitchen. There is also a door to the exterior at the northern end of the hall. The eastern wall of the dining room features a fireplace and a built-in hutch; the latter is a contemporary addition. Documentation reveals that this room contained a Franklin stove in the 1820s; however, the fireplace has since been rebuilt. This room also features exposed hand-hewn beams; however, they are significantly larger than those in the west room and the ceiling itself is higher. As in the western section of the house, the ceiling in this room was originally plastered. All windows and trim on the main floor of this section appear original, as does the mantel. The first floor features wide plank hardwood floors throughout. Changes other than those noted include replacement of original hardware and possibly some of the doors.

On the upper floor, the western half is now divided into two bedrooms, one with an attached bath. The eastern section is divided into an office with bath (in the hall over the stairs) and a single large bedroom with fireplace.

The latter was originally divided into two small bedrooms. Ceilings in the eastern section have been removed, exposing the rafters. Access to the attic in the western section is through a hatch in the office area. Hewn rafters in this section are pegged with no ridge pole and show scribe marks, consistent with the late 18th century construction date.

Access to the basement kitchen is from the hall in the eastern section of the house and from an exterior door on the south elevation. A beehive oven survives on the east wall; however, the fireplace has been rebuilt. The basement on the west side of the house is unfinished; however log joists are not typical and may have been later replacements.

The Rushmore farmhouse is a good representative example of late 18th century to early 19th century stone residential architecture in Greene County. Original forms and many original materials survive or are clearly discernible. Spatial divisions and room uses have changed over time and help to illustrate how the building was adapted to meet the needs of its occupants over more than a century.

=== Smokehouse ===
The smokehouse, located northeast of the residence, is a tall stone structure surmounted by a wood-shingle gable roof with overhanging eaves. There is a vertical-board wood door with iron hardware in the south wall and small rectangular openings in the gables. The smokehouse is believed to date to the late 18th century or early 19th century.

=== Garage ===
The three-car garage, constructed in 1980, is a rectangular (20' by 32') wood-frame building with a standing-seem metal gable roof surmounted by a small cupola with weathervane. It sits on a concrete slab and features novelty siding.

=== Shed ===
The shed is a small, square (8' by 8'), wood-frame building with novelty siding and a gable roof with overhanging eaves. There is a vertical-board wood door in the north elevation and a small vent in the gable. The shed occupies the site of an original milk house.

== Brief history ==
The Rushmore farmhouse is architecturally significant as a distinctive example of a vernacular stone farmhouse. The six-by-two-bay, 1 1/2-story building was constructed in two stages by Jeremiah Rushmore; a descendant of English Quakers from Long Island, whose family owned the property for more than a century. Although the exact building date is not known, tax records and construction details indicate a late 18th-century construction date or the earlier (western) half, while Rushmore's will confirms that the later (eastern) addition was constructed before his death in 1828. The building underwent renovations in the late 1830s or early 1840s, which probably account for the Greek Revival period trim and porch, dormers were added at a later date. The house was constructed of uncoursed fieldstone and surmounted by a steeply pitched gable roof pierced by interior end chimneys. The building's stone construction and long, low form with steep gables are typical of Dutch, German, and English settlement groups in the late 18th century; however, its specific framing method and spatial divisions are indicative of English building practices and may reflect the family's Long Island origins. These differences are particularly evident in the interior of the older section, which features a jambed fireplace, more and smaller floor joists, and, originally, a compact arrangement of small rooms, all features more common to houses built by those of English descent. When the house was doubled in size in the first quarter of the 19th century, the new eastern section was built with a basement kitchen and hall and "best room" plan on the first floor, probably reflecting Jeremiah Rushmore's increased wealth and the needs of a larger family. It is interesting that Rushmore's will (1826, codicil 1828) specified how the spaces in the expanded house would be used after his death. He ensured that his widow and unmarried daughter would remain in the house, according them the use of the first-floor best room and two second-floor bedrooms in the new section. At the same time, his daughter was forbidden to enter the old section, now home to her brother Richard and his family. The basement kitchen was apparently accessible to all. Despite a number of changes, the house provides important evidence of regional architecture during the early years of the American republic and illustrates the evolution of a small farm house over time to meet the needs of a changing family. The Rushmore property was a working farm with large orchards for over a century. Although subdivided over time, the nominated ninety-five acre property retains an open setting and several agricultural dependencies, including an original stone smokehouse and the remains of a barn and silo, which burned in the 1960s.

== Rushmore Family ==
The first Thomas Rushmore, a Welsh immigrant, arrived in Long Island in 1648. He married Martha Hicks and had four children, including a son Thomas, born c1655. The younger Thomas Rushmore married Sarah (last name unknown) around 1693–95. Their son, also Thomas, was born in 1693 in Hempstead. This Thomas married twice. His first marriage, c1715, to Anneke Hendrickson, a Quaker, produced seven children: Martha (b. 1716), Jacob (b. 1720), Sarah (b. 1722), Thomas (b.I724), Silas (b. 1727), Stephen (b. 1731), and Isaac (b.1733 ). Thomas Rushmore's son Silas is believed to be the Silas Rushmore listed in Greene County history.

Silas married Phebe Titus in 1753. The pair had six children: Martha (b. 1754), Samuel (b. 1761), Jacob (b. 1755), Jeremiah (1765–1828), Sarah (no date) and Mary (no date), all of whom were born on Long Island. It is unclear when the Rushmores arrived in what was then Albany County; however, Silas Rushmore, along with Thomas, Jeremiah, and Jacob, who appear to be relatives (brothers or sons), appears in tax documents for the area that became Greene County beginning in 1787. According to deeds located in the Greene County Clerk's office, Silas bought and sold numerous parcels of land in the late 18th century and early 19th century.

The Rushmores also owned a grist mill, originally known as the Van Vechten Mill, in the town of Catskill, on the Catskill Creek. A Quaker marriage record from the Nine Partners Monthly Meeting, Dutchess, N.Y. for Thomas Rushmore, son of Silas and Phebe, to Abigail Griffin in 1797 suggests that the Rushmore family was living in the Hudson Valley by this date.

Silas Rushmore's son Jeremiah was born in Hempstead, Long Island in 1765. He married Martha Roby and they had three children: Richard (1787–1837), Anna (b. 1804) and Morris (b. c1814). Between 1790 and 1799, census records list both Silas and Jeremiah Rushmore as heads of households with land in Athens; however, it is unclear which of them purchased the nominated property. Jeremiah Rushmore is the probable builder and first documented occupant of the nominated house. Tax records from 1799 show that Jeremiah Rushmore owned a house and land in the town of Catskill (Athens was not a separate town until 1805) valued at 1,560 pounds and personal wealth of 172 pounds. The 1801 Tax Assessment also lists Jeremiah as owning a house and lands in Catskill with a personal estate value of 3,000 pounds. An article in the Catskill Recorder reporting the death of one of Jeremiah Rushmore's workers in September 1806 documents his ownership of the nominated house by that date. Although another article reported that the house and two hundred acres of land, including one hundred acres of meadow, were for sale in 1811, Jeremiah purchased an additional 20 acres (81,000 m^{2}) in 1812 and retained ownership until his death, when the property passed to his son Richard in 1813, another article described the Rushmore property as including three orchards with over three hundred trees. Jeremiah Rushmore died 28 October 1828. His will and codicil, dated 1826 and 1828, respectively, and probated in November 1828, stipulated that his son Morris was to inherit the farm he was living on in Coxsackie and that Richard would inherit the Athens farm. The will confirms that the second half of the house had been constructed before Jeremiah's death, in that it specified that his wife, Martha, and unmarried daughter, Anna, could continue to live in his "new house" and use the upper (first floor) room and two bedrooms upstairs. In the codicil Rushmore specified that his daughter was not permitted to enter the old house. Martha Rushmore was permitted to use the Franklin stove in the upper room and Richard was directed to provide firewood for Martha and Anna. Jeremiah was very wealthy, and at his death an inventory of his possessions showed that he had almost $300 along with forty-one linen sheets. His widow, Martha, died on 21 February 1830. Richard Rushmore married Deborah Wilson (date unknown) and the couple had nine children: Thomas Lembuck (b. 1810), Delanco (no dates), Mary E. (1815–1865), Solon (1816–1870), infant son (1817–1821), James (1818–1821), Erasmus (1823–1886), Martha Ann (1828–1831), and Laban Coleman (1830–1909). After her husband's death on 3 January 1837, Deborah and her minor children continued to operate the farm. The New York State Agricultural Census for 1855 reported that the farm consisted of two hundred acres, produced five hundred pounds of butter, and had apple orchards. The Rushmore property appears on local maps in 1856 and 1867. There was also a cider mill located on the property at this time, and the family continued to own and operate the Catskill mill.

Between 1837 and 1843, a number of improvements were made on the farm. These were recorded in a document written 11 March 1843 by George Griffin, Jr. 'at the request of my neighbors' to determine an 'estimate of the amount expended in permanent improvements of the farm.' George Griffin owned a farm that bordered the Rushmore Farm, Griffin recorded labor and material costs as well as income earned from 1837 to 1843. Repairs to the house include labor costs for a carpenter and mason and for material and labor for work on the kitchen and the east room. Work on the farm buildings included construction of a wood house and root cellar, repairs to the corn house and cider mill, milk room, hog press and barn, hay press and barn, and lower barn, as well as repairs to the stone walls and board fence on the property.

Richard and Deborah's oldest son, Erasmus (1823–1886), never married and worked on the family farm until his death. He never owned the property, however, which continued in his mother's ownership until it passed to his brother Laban. Laban Coleman Rushmore (1830–1909) lived in the town of Catskill and ran the mill, as documented by local census documents for the years 1869 and 1873. Before and after these years, census records show him living on the farm with his mother, his wife, and his daughter, Ella. Laban married twice. His first marriage was to Elvira Dean, a descendant of the Salisbury family, one of the area's settling families, on her mother's side. Elvira's mother, Eleanor Salisbury Dean, lived on the farm with Laban and Elvira at the end of her life, Elvira Dean Rushmore died in 1877 at the age of fifty-five, and Laban then married Sallie Ann (Sarah Ann) Stone. Sallie Ann Stone Rushmore continued to live on the farm after her husband's death until 1912, when she sold it to Stephen Harrison and moved into the village of Athens, where she lived until her death in 1924.

=== Later Owners ===
The Rushmore property has had nine owners since it has passed out of the Rushmore family in 1912. The Stewarts purchased the farm, then containing 239.37 acres (0.9687 km^{2}), from Stephen Harrison in 1914. A 1930 tax assessment shows the property consisting of 197 acres (0.80 km^{2}), with an assessed value of $5,000 (with $142.50 of taxes owed). In 1941, the Stewarts sold the farm to the Deans, who owned it until 1950. The farm passed from the Deans to the Sterritts, who sold 239.37 acres (0.9687 km^{2}) to Frank E. Low in 1969. The Lows sold off part of the property, reducing it to the current acreage of 95.37 acres (385,900 m^{2}), during their ownership. Since the Low period, ownership of the property has changed hands repeatedly. Pamela Hobbs purchased the house in 1971 and proceeded to undertake repairs, including refurbishing the porch and reconstructing the beehive oven. Michele Saunders-Laine, purchased the property in 2004. The current owners, Evren Ay and Asli Ay purchased the property in September 2010.

== Architectural Analysis ==
The Rushmore farmhouse is a 1 1/2-story vernacular stone house built in two separate sections. Stone is a traditional building material in the upper Hudson Valley due to the large limestone ridge that runs the entire length of west side of the Hudson River from Albany south to Kingston and then inland to Port Jervis.

Although stone houses are often considered a building type specific to Dutch settlement groups, Huguenot, German, and English settlers built them as well, and members of these groups borrowed freely from each other. Most examples of the type are relatively similar in appearance, characterized by a long, low form, probably reflecting the structural capabilities of the rubble stone walls, and a steep gable roof, and most grew by accretion, adding new rooms in a linear pattern. Nevertheless, within the general type, construction details and spatial divisions varied and often reflected ethnic or geographic differences. Other distinctions, such as overall size, number of rooms, and degree of ornamentation might reflect differences of class and status; however, all stone-houses symbolized that their owners had achieved a certain degree of wealth or position, as those without either were generally housed in wooden structures.

Examination of the Rushmore house corroborates a late 18th-century construction date for the western, original half of the building. This section has a three-bay façade with center entrance and an interior end chimney on the west wall. A window south of the chimney on the west wall is a later addition. Although there is little intact original fabric in this section, several conclusions can be drawn from extant features. The hewn ceiling beams, which run north–south, are relatively small in size, in keeping with late 18th century and early 19th century construction methods.

Although the beams are now exposed, the ceiling was probably originally plastered. A large east–west summer beam, added in the 1970s, suggests the approximate location of an original partition in the west room that would have both supported the light beams and divided the room into a two-thirds/one-third configuration, with the larger space, inside the door, serving as the kitchen. The smaller room towards the back of the building was the location of an enclosed stair to the second floor. The space to the east, now a kitchen, laundry and bath, would probably also have been divided into two spaces, and a second chimney may have been located on the east wall of the original house. The latter chimney would have been removed when the east section was added. Hewn rafters with scribe marks in the attic also support a late 18th-century construction date for the west side. The original three-bay facade, as well as the compact arrangement of small rooms, is typical of English building practices and may also reflect the family' s Long Island origins.

The eastern section of the building, which doubled the size of the farmhouse, had probably been added by 1813, when Jeremiah Rushmore placed the advertisement describing two houses on his property. The existence of the addition is confirmed by Jeremiah 's will and codicil from 1826 and 1828, respectively, which specified that his mother and sister were to retain use of the parlor and upper bedrooms in the "new" house. The hall and best room plan survives on the first floor, where other original fabric includes the windows and mantel. The tall ceiling, originally intended to be plastered, is also indicative of the early 19th century period. A built-in hutch was added next to the chimney in a later period. The new kitchen was located in the basement, enhancing the compact design of the house. This variation, while not unique, contrasts with a number of period stone residences, which often featured kitchen additions on rear or end walls. In the half story of the east addition, the original two bedrooms have been combined into one, and ceilings have been removed to expose the original rafters. Despite changes, the interior of the farmhouse retains sufficient integrity to provide information about its original construction and evolution over time. Changes to the exterior of the house include the addition of a full-width porch, frieze, and corniche with returns.

Although the date of these alterations is not documented, the use of the Greek Revival style and the fact that a number of repair projects were undertaken by Deborah Rushmore between 1837 and 1843 suggests that these changes may have occurred in that period. Dormer windows on the south elevation are also not original; however, their date of construction is not known.

One dependency, a stone smokehouse, survives to represent the agricultural history of the property. Ruins of a barn and silo have not yet been studied but could increase understanding of the farm. Although the property retains ninety-five acres of original Rushmore land, much of it is too wet for farming, and there are no longer any orchards associated with it. Nevertheless, the property retains an open pastoral quality and a secluded setting that help to recall its long history as a working farm.
