= Newkirk Homestead =

Historic house in New York, United States

- U.S. National Register of Historic Places
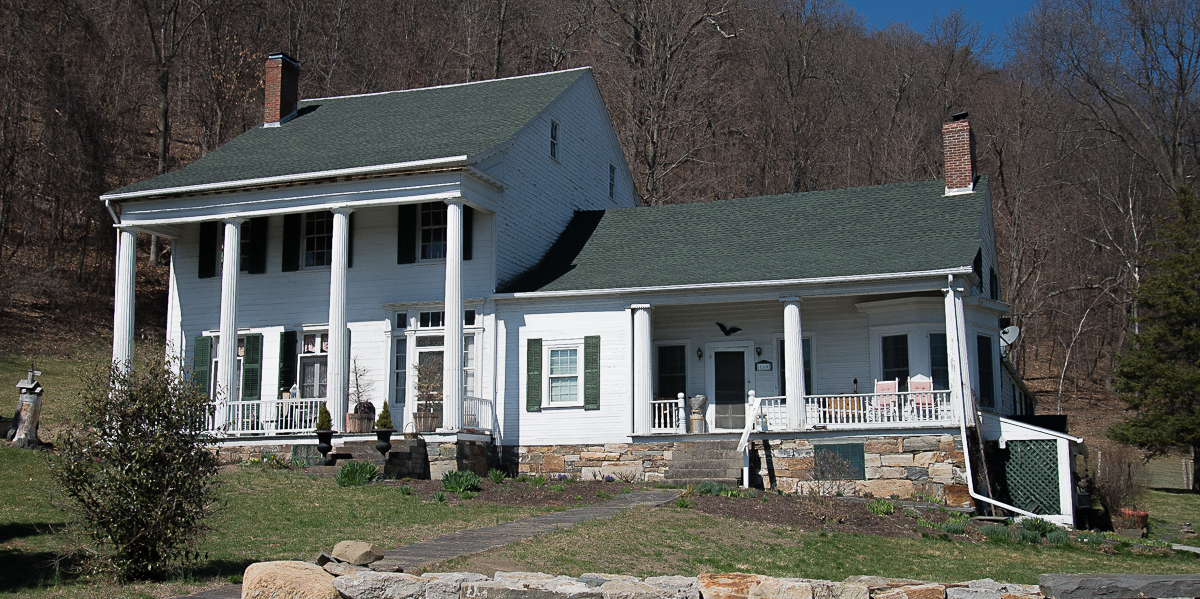

- Location within New York Location within the United States
- Location: Northwest of Leeds on Sandy Plains Rd., Leeds, New York
- Coordinates: 42°15′59″N 73°54′26″W
- Area: 20 acres (8.1 ha)
- Built: 1849
- Architectural style: Mixed (more Than 2 Styles From Different Periods)
- NRHP reference No.: 79001584
- Added to NRHP: July 22, 1979

Newkirk Homestead, also known as the Newkirk-Garcia House, is a historic home located at Leeds in Greene County, New York. The original structure and basement dates to the 18th century. It is a five-bay, 1 1/2-story frame dwelling to which is attached a 2-story, three-bay frame addition completed in the mid-19th century. It features a Greek Revival style portico with four Doric columns, also added in the mid-19th century. Also on the property are a corn crib, two barns, and a barn foundation.

It was listed on the National Register of Historic Places in 1979.
