= Bronk-Silvester House =

Historic house in New York, United States

- U.S. National Register of Historic Places
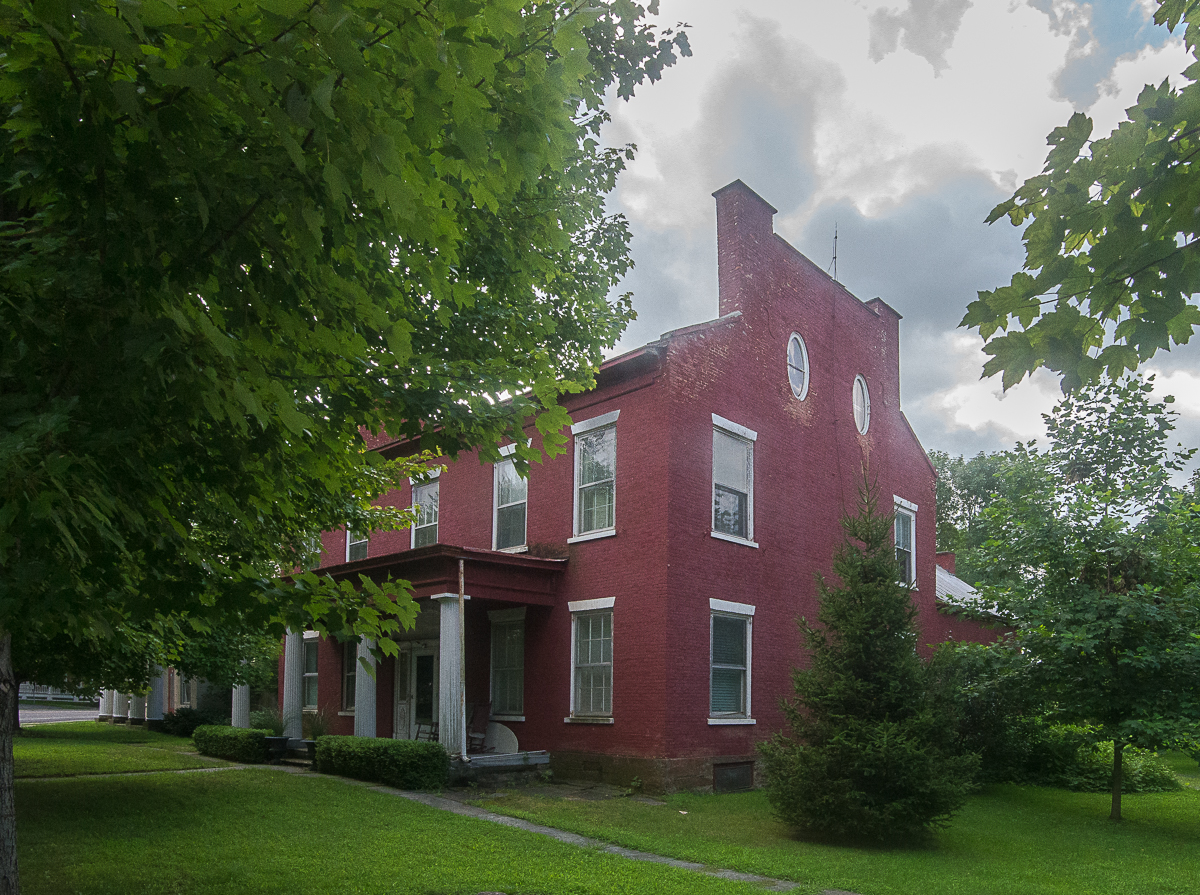

- Location within New York Location within the United States
- Location: 188 Mansion St., Coxsackie, New York
- Coordinates: 42°21′33″N 73°48′51″W
- Area: less than one acre
- Built: 1811
- Architectural style: Federal
- NRHP reference No.: 02000140
- Added to NRHP: March 12, 2002

The Bronk-Silvester House is a historic house located at 188 Mansion Street in Coxsackie, Greene County, New York.

== Description and history ==
It was built in 1811 and is a two-story, two-by-five-bay brick dwelling with a stone foundation and gabled-roof. It features a center hall plan interior and is in the Federal style.

It was listed on the National Register of Historic Places on March 12, 2002.
