= John Van Vechten House =

Historic house in New York, United States

- U.S. National Register of Historic Places
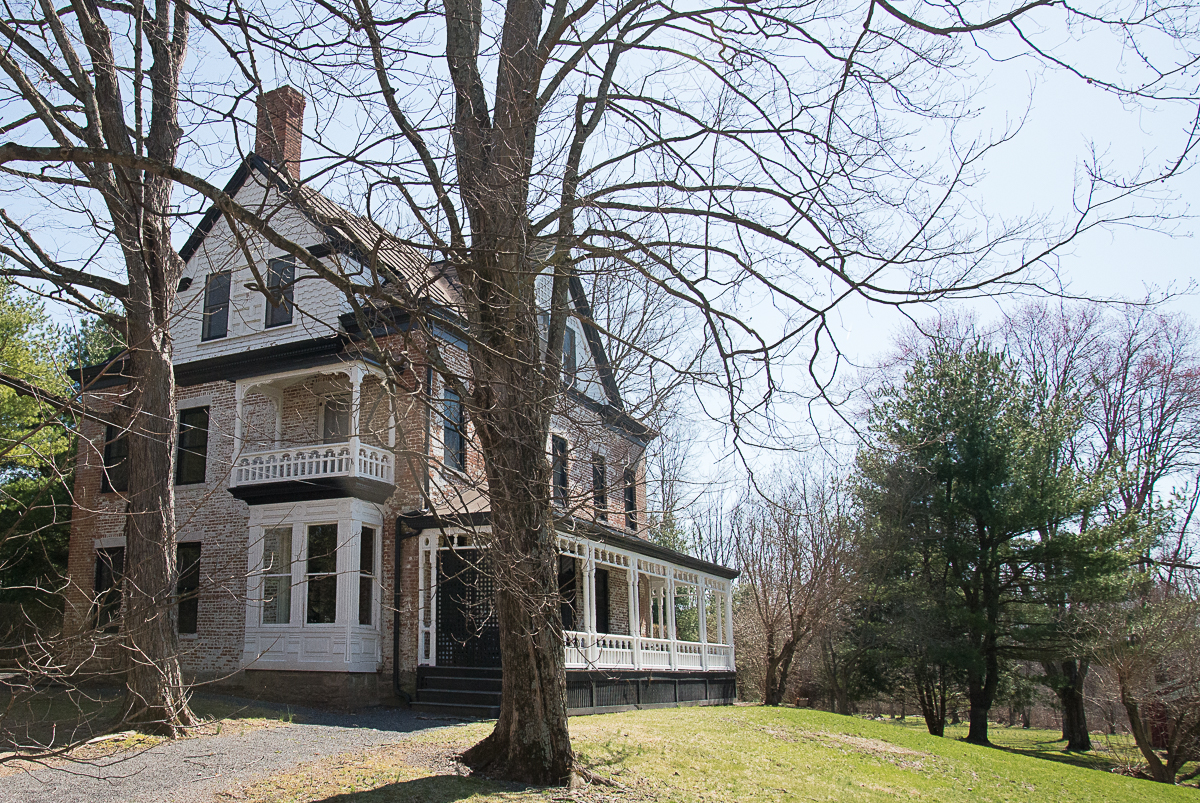

- Location within New York Location within the United States
- Location: Susquehanna Tpk. (Co. Rd. 23B), Leeds, New York
- Coordinates: 42°15′19″N 73°54′14″W
- Area: 3 acres (1.2 ha)
- Built: 1891
- Architectural style: Queen Anne
- NRHP reference No.: 95000212
- Added to NRHP: March 10, 1995

John Van Vechten House is a historic home located at Leeds in Greene County, New York. It was built in 1891 and is a masonry, 2 1/2-story Queen Anne–style dwelling with rectangular massing on a stone foundation. It features large gable wall dormers and a hipped roof with standing seam metal roofing.

It was listed on the National Register of Historic Places in 1995.
