= Prattsville Reformed Dutch Church =

Historic church in New York, United States

Reformed Dutch Church of Prattsville
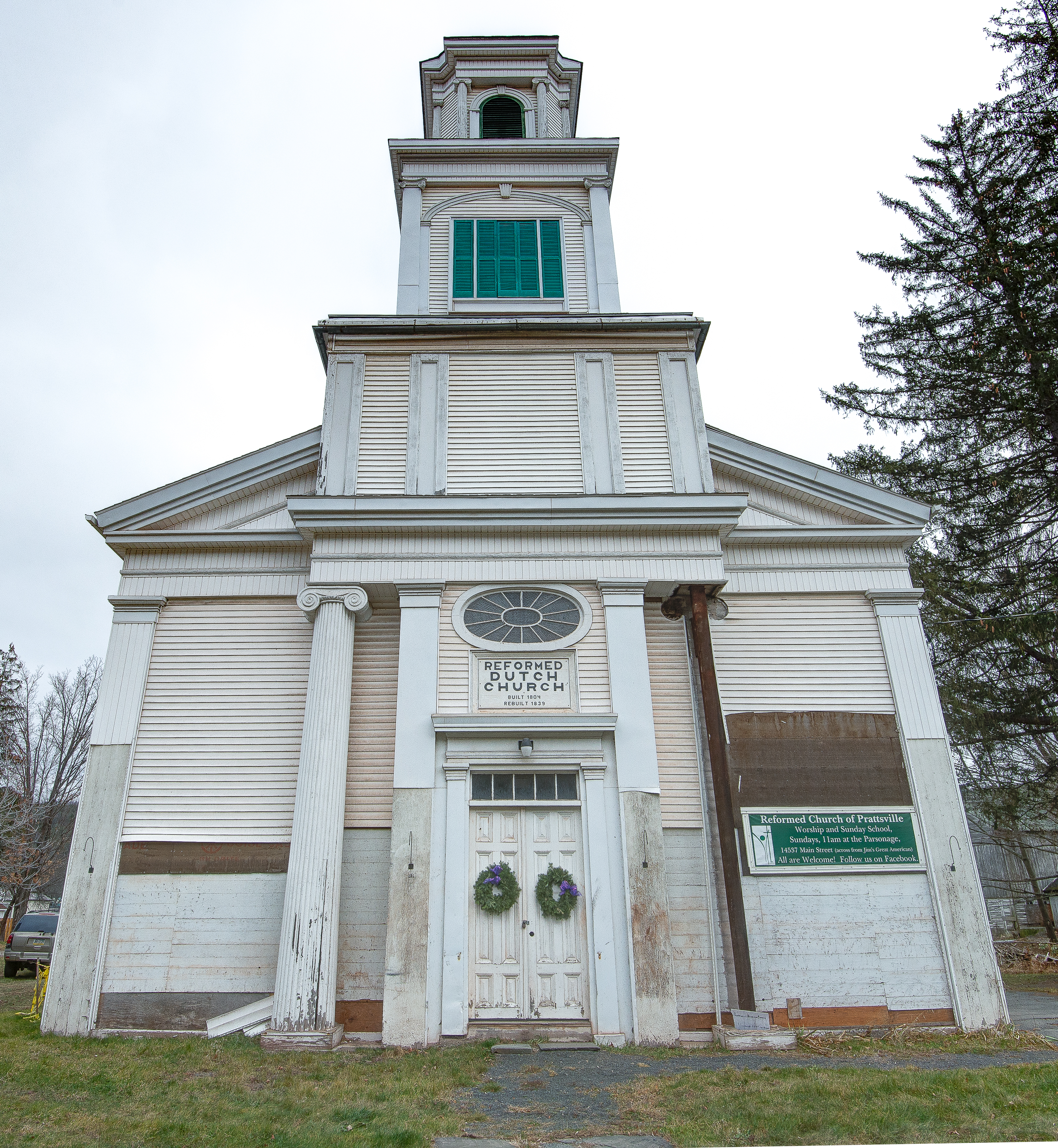
- Prattsville Reformed Dutch Church, December 2015

Religion
- Affiliation: Reformed Church in America
- Leadership: Rev. Rebecca Town
- Year consecrated: 1835

Location
- Location: Prattsville, NY
- Interactive map of Reformed Dutch Church of Prattsville
- Coordinates: 42°19′0″N 74°26′9″W

Architecture
- Style: Federal / Greek Revival
- Completed: 1835
- Materials: Wood

U.S. National Register of Historic Places
- Added to NRHP: 1996
- NRHP Reference no.: 96001430

Website
- https://prattsvillereformed.wordpress.com/

The Reformed Dutch Church of Prattsville was originally built in 1804, and was rebuilt in 1835. It is located on Main St. in Prattsville, New York, United States, and is an example of Greek Revival and Federal style Architecture. It was added to the National Register of Historic Places in July, 1996. The church building was badly damaged in Hurricane Irene in 2011. The congregation is still active and worships in an alternate building until the building pictured here is repaired.

A BRIEF HISTORY

The present day Reformed Dutch Church in Prattsville, New York, was the Society of Schoharie Kill when it began in 1798. For a few years church-goers in the little wilderness settlement on the Schoharie Creek met in a convenient house or barn. By 1804 they were thankful to congregate in their new meeting house which they had built on the spot where we are now, the western curve of Main Street, Route 23.

Birth and baptism records show us that six-year-old Catherine Bird was the first person baptized by pioneer pastor Rev. Peter Labagh on May 30, 1798. Surviving records of marriages and deaths from 1833 on show Luther Maben and Elizabeth Dutcher as the couple heading the list of marriages and Ophelia Osborn the first person mourned in death. As is true of many early churches, no deed to the church property has been found. A cemetery deed, though, does tell us that on June 16, 1803, Martinus Larroway and John Larroway deeded to Elder Henrich Becker and Deacons Isaac Hardenburgh and Lawrence C. Decker of the Dutch Reformed Church land on the east side of the Schoharry Kill “to bury all corpses of the deceased persons belonging to the above society,” (Huggans-Lutz Cemetery)

If Catherine Bird continued to live nearby, until the 1830s, she would have referred to “the new meeting house”. By then members had again united to reconstruct the church which had been destroyed by fire. This is the structure we see today, changed in ways we shall discover, especially in 1971-2 when it was restored through the generosity of the O’Connor Foundation.

In Catherine's day church members expected to see the pastor only once in three weeks or so because he had other assignments in the surrounding countryside. With the distances and treacherous roads, traveling by horseback amounted to over 100 challenging miles round-trip for the dominie. (Dutch word for pastor)

Salaries were contributed by the various churches a pastor served. But encouraged and underwritten by tanner Zadock Pratt, our church installed its own pastor Reverend Hamilton VanDyke (1833) at $400.00 per year. He died in the pastorate April 26, 1836, at the age of 29 and is buried in the Benham-Pratt Cemetery, Maple Lane.

Farmers, tradesmen, craftsmen, professional people as well as many tanning workers were attracted to Prattsville, particularly in the years that the tannery was in full operation (1825-1845). Growing prosperity and concern for the material needs of a spiritual leader motivated financial support from the Reformed Church people. The Reformed Dutch Church, part of the Reformed Church in America, has survived for these 200 years, some years difficult especially those without a minister, and yet in all years rejoicing as members of God's household, witnessing to the Gospel of our Lord and praying to continue in the years to come.

---

1835 Articles of Incorporation' Prattsville Dutch Reformed Religious Societies - Book A

Original Index is located in the vault at the Greene County Courthouse. This document found on page 60. Transcribed by Arlene Goodwin.

We Calvin Wiltse & Platt M. Osborne two of the members of the Reformed Dutch Church and Society of the town of Prattsville elected by a majority of the members present to hold an election of trustees of said Church and Society to all to whom these present may concern do certify and make known that pursuant to an act of the legislature of the state of New York entitled “an act to provide for the incorporation of religious Societies” the male persons of full age belonging to the Said reformed Dutch Church or Society of Prattsville did assemble and meet together on the twenty sixth day of January in the year one thousand eight hundred and thirty five, at the meeting house in Prattsville the place at which they statedly attend for the divine worship for the purpose of electing trustees for the said Church and Society the said church and Society having been duly notified of the time and place of such meeting previous thereto in the manner prescribed by the said act, the said male persons belonging to the said Society did then and there determine that six trustees should be elected to take charge of the state and property belonging to the said Society and to transact all affairs relative to the temporalities thereof and that the style of the said trustees and their successors in office should be “the trustees of the reformed Dutch Church and Congregation of Prattsville" as the style named and title by which the said trustees shall forever hereafter be called distinguished and known and that thereupon on the same day year and place above mentioned, an election was held for electing such trustees and John Brackney, Robert More, Zadock, Pratt, John Laraway Dwight Brockett and Henry T. Beeker were by a plurality of votes elected trustees of said Society in presence of Plat M. Osborn, F. A. Finn, Calvin Wiltse State of New York Greene County. On the twenty sixth day of January 1835 personally appeared before me the subscriber a commissioner of deeds to take the acknowledged _____ ____ & in Said County Calvin Wiltse and Platt M. Osborn persons well known to me as the persons named in this written instrument and severally acknowledged that they signed and executed the same freely and voluntarily for the acts and purposes therein expressed I do allow it to be recorded.

1955 Articles of Incorporation At a time when there were no electronic documents and the 1835 Articles could not be located, new articles were drawn up.

Certificate of Incorporation of The Reformed Dutch Church of Prattsville, New York

Pursuant to Article Six of the Religious Corporations Law.

We the undersigned, being the minister, the elders and deacons of the Reformed Dutch Church of Prattsville, New York, an unincorporated church in connection with the Reformed Church in America for the purpose of incorporating the same pursuant to Article Six of the Religious Corporations Law, and all be person of full age, of whom at least two-thirds are citizens of the United States, and one a resident of the State of New York, do hereby certify as follows:

First: The name of the proposed corporation shall be: The Reformed Dutch Church of Prattsville, New York

Second: Its principal place of worship is located in the Town of Prattsville and County of Greene in the State of New York. In witness whereof, we have executed and acknowledged this certificate this 30th day of September, 1955. Signed by Rev. Bruce G. Freeman (Minister) Sayers A. Lutz (Elder) Richard Smith (Elder) John F Becker (Elder) Claude W. Lutz (Deacon) Frank Dresser (Deacon) Elmer Northrup (Deacon) And a Notary Public

== Gallery ==
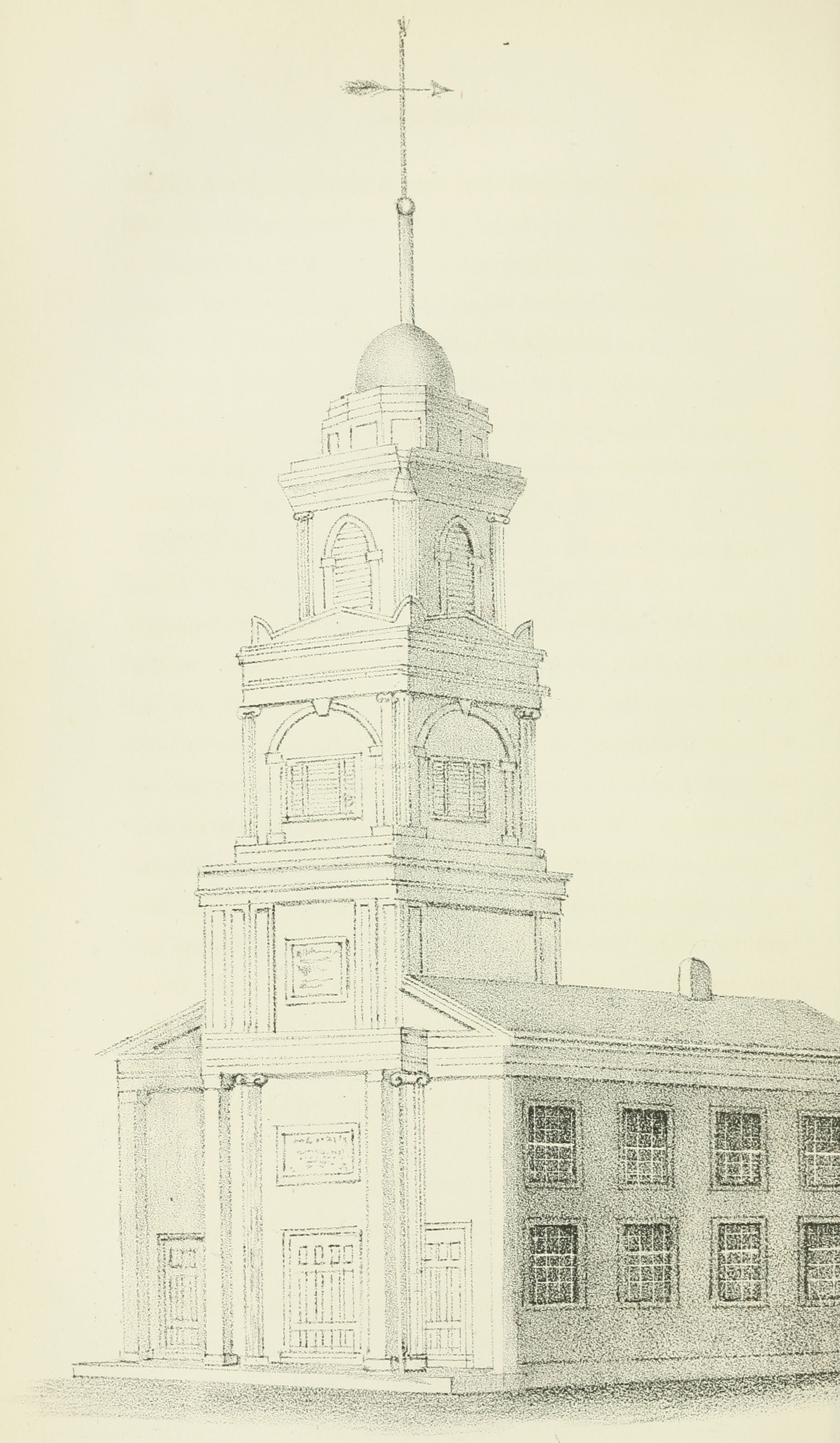
A drawing from the mid-1800s of the Church.

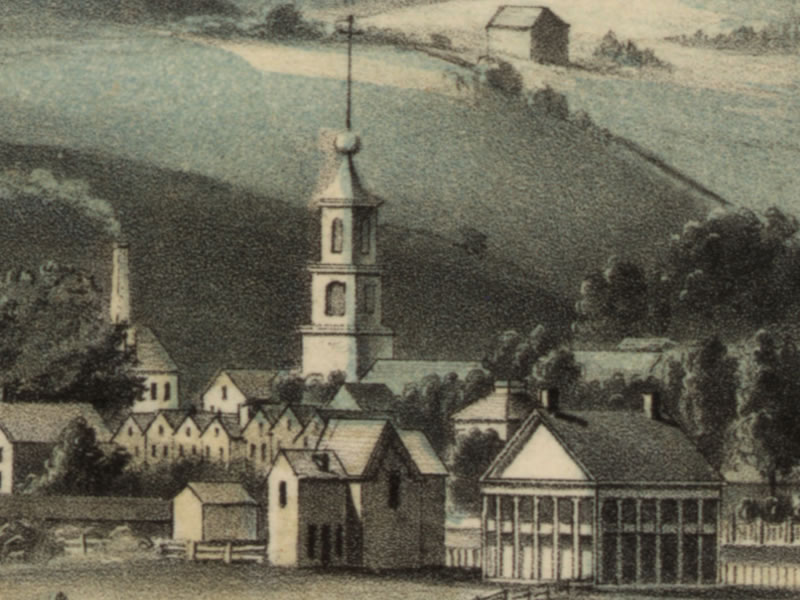
The church can be seen in an 1844 lithograph of the town.
