= New Baltimore (CDP), New York =

New Baltimore, New York
- Census-designated place
- Location within New York Location within the United States
- Coordinates: 42°26′46″N 73°47′21″W
- Country: United States
- State: New York
- County: Greene
- Town: New Baltimore

Area
  - Total: 2.03 sq mi (5.25 km^{2})
  - Land: 1.76 sq mi (4.55 km^{2})
  - Water: 0.27 sq mi (0.70 km^{2})
- Elevation: 120 ft (37 m)

Population (2020)
  - Total: 546
  - Density: 310.7/sq mi (119.95/km^{2})
- Time zone: UTC-5 (Eastern (EST))
  - Summer (DST): UTC-4 (EDT)
- ZIP Codes: 12124 (New Baltimore); 12087 (Hannacroix); 12192 (West Coxsackie)
- Area codes: 518/838
- FIPS code: 36-49924
- GNIS feature ID: 2804328

New Baltimore is the primary hamlet in the town of New Baltimore, Greene County, New York, United States. It is a census-designated place (CDP), first listed as such prior to the 2020 census. The New Baltimore Hamlet Historic District occupies the historic core of the hamlet.

The CDP is in the northeastern corner of Greene County and the town of New Baltimore, overlooking the Hudson River. The community's northern border is with the town of Coeymans in Albany County, and the western border follows Hannacrois Creek, a tributary of the Hudson, and Interstate 87, the New York State Thruway. The closest Thruway access points are Exit 21B (Coxsackie), 4 miles (6 km) to the south, and Exit 22 (Selkirk), 6 miles (10 km) to the north. New York State Route 144 passes through the center of the hamlet, leading southwest 2 miles (3 km) to U.S. Route 9W and north the same distance to the hamlet of Coeymans.

== Demographics ==
Historical population
Census	Pop.	Note	%±
2020	546		—
U.S. Decennial Census
