= New York State Route 396 =

State highway in Albany County, New York, US

New York State Route 396
- Map of Albany County in eastern New York with NY 396 highlighted in red

Route information
- Maintained by NYSDOT
- Length: 6.58 mi (10.59 km)
- Existed: 1930–present

Major junctions
- West end: CR 103 / CR 301 in Coeymans
- US 9W in Bethlehem
- East end: NY 144 in Bethlehem

Location
- Country: United States
- State: New York
- Counties: Albany

Highway system
- New York Highways; Interstate; US; State; Reference; Parkways
← NY 395	→ NY 397

New York State Route 396 (NY 396) is a 6.58-mile-long (10.59 km) east–west state highway in Albany County, New York, in the United States. The route is functionally a spur route as it connects to another signed state highway at only one end. The western terminus of NY 396 is at an intersection with County Route 103 (CR 103) in Callanans Corners, a small hamlet situated just south of the Bethlehem–Coeymans town line in the town of Coeymans. Its eastern terminus is at a junction with NY 144 in Bethlehem east of the hamlet of Selkirk. West of Callanans Corners, the road continues northwestward to NY 443 in New Scotland as CR 301. NY 396 was assigned as part of the 1930 renumbering of state highways in New York.

== Route description ==
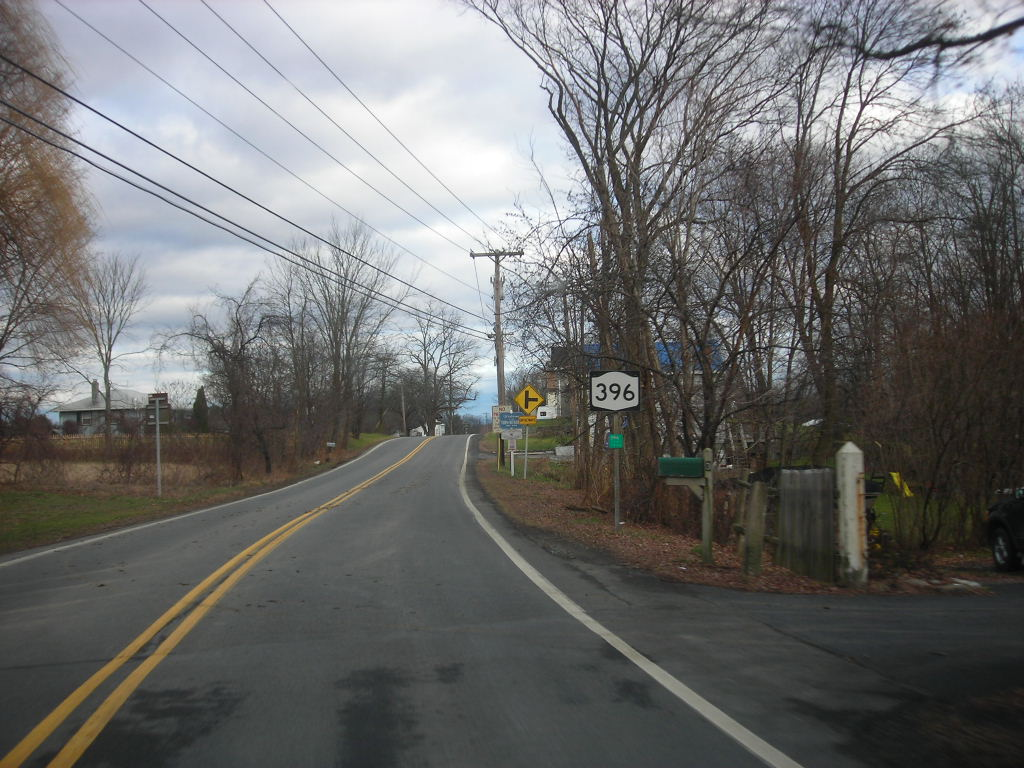
NY 396 eastbound from the terminus at County Route 301 in South Bethlehem

NY 396 begins at an intersection with CR 103 in Coeymans. To the west, the road is CR 301. The highway also changes names from Cedar Grove Road to Bridge Street. NY 396 progresses eastward, intersecting with local roads in the undeveloped lowlands. At an intersection with CR 102 (Old Quarry and Starr roads), the highway enters Spawn Hollow, a local hamlet. After that intersection, NY 396 becomes more developed, entering South Bethlehem, and intersecting with several local roads.

After South Bethlehem, NY 396 enters the hamlet of Bethlehem Heights, where the highway curves to the northeast. NY 396 passes over the Selkirk Subdivision, a railroad line owned by CSX Transportation, at the eastern edge of the large Selkirk Yard. Past the bridge, the highway turns eastward and into the hamlet of Beckers Corners, where it intersects with U.S. Route 9W (US 9W). After that intersection, NY 396 turns to the southeast once again, leaving its original right-of-way along Maple Avenue at an intersection with Beaverdam Road. The route bends several times in a highly developed region as it enters the community of Selkirk. NY 396 turns eastward and terminates at an intersection with NY 144 (River Road) east of Selkirk. Not far to the north of the junction, NY 144 connects to the New York State Thruway (Interstate 87) at exit 22.

== History ==
The origins of NY 396 date back to the mid-1900s when the portion of the route east of modern US 9W was first improved to state highway standards. Work on the highway was performed as part of a project awarded June 11, 1904, that also called for the reconstruction of what is now NY 144 between NY 396 and Feura Bush Road (unsigned NY 910A and formerly part of NY 32). The roads rebuilt as part of the project were added to the state highway system on December 5, 1906, as unsigned State Highway 193 (SH 193). In 1908, the westernmost 0.82 miles (1.32 km) of SH 193 was included as part of Route 3, an unsigned legislative route that followed the modern US 9W corridor between Highland Falls and Albany.

When the first set of posted routes in New York were assigned in 1924, most of legislative Route 3 became part of NY 10. The alignments of the two routes differed north of New Baltimore: while Route 3 went due north through Ravena and Selkirk to Albany, NY 10 ran alongside the Hudson River on current NY 144 instead. In the early-to-mid-1920s, the state of New York acquired a road connecting the west end of SH 193 to Callanans Corners in the town of Coeymans. The new highway was entered into the state highway system as SH 1562. In the 1930 renumbering of state highways in New York, the Selkirk leg of SH 193 and SH 1562 were collectively designated as NY 396. The route's alignment has not been altered since.

== Major intersections ==
The entire route is in Albany County.

Location	mi	km	Destinations	Notes
Coeymans	0.00	0.00	CR 103 (Blodgett Hill Road) / CR 301 west	Western terminus, eastern terminus of CR 301; hamlet of Callanans Corners
Bethlehem	4.44	7.15	US 9W – Albany, Ravena	Hamlet of Beckers Corners
Bethlehem	6.58	10.59	NY 144 (River Road) to I-87 / New York Thruway – Albany, Coeymans	Eastern terminus; hamlet of Selkirk
1.000 mi = 1.609 km; 1.000 km = 0.621 mi
