= New York State Route 144 =

Highway in New York

New York State Route 144
- Map of the southern Capital District with NY 144 highlighted in red

Route information
- Maintained by NYSDOT
- Length: 14.74 mi (23.72 km)
- Existed: 1930–present

Major junctions
- South end: US 9W in New Baltimore
- I-87 Toll / New York Thruway in Bethlehem
- North end: NY 32 in Bethlehem

Location
- Country: United States
- State: New York
- Counties: Greene, Albany

Highway system
- New York Highways; Interstate; US; State; Reference; Parkways
← NY 143	→ NY 145

New York State Route 144 (NY 144) is a state highway in the Capital District of New York in the United States. The highway runs for 14.74 miles (23.72 km) as a two-lane road from an intersection with U.S. Route 9W (US 9W) in the Greene County town of New Baltimore to a junction with NY 32 in the town of Bethlehem just south of the Albany city limits. NY 144 closely parallels the New York State Thruway (Interstate 87 or I-87) and the west bank of the Hudson River as it heads across Albany County. The Thruway and NY 144 connect at exit 22 about 6 miles (9.7 km) south of Albany in Bethlehem.

NY 144 was originally designated as part of NY 10 in the mid-1920s and as part of US 9W from the late 1920s to the mid-1930s. In the 1930 renumbering of state highways in New York, NY 144 was assigned to what is now US 9W between New Baltimore and Albany. The alignments of US 9W and NY 144 were flipped in the mid-1930s, placing the latter on a routing that extended north from Bethlehem to downtown Albany. NY 144 was truncated to its present length in the late 1960s.

== Route description ==
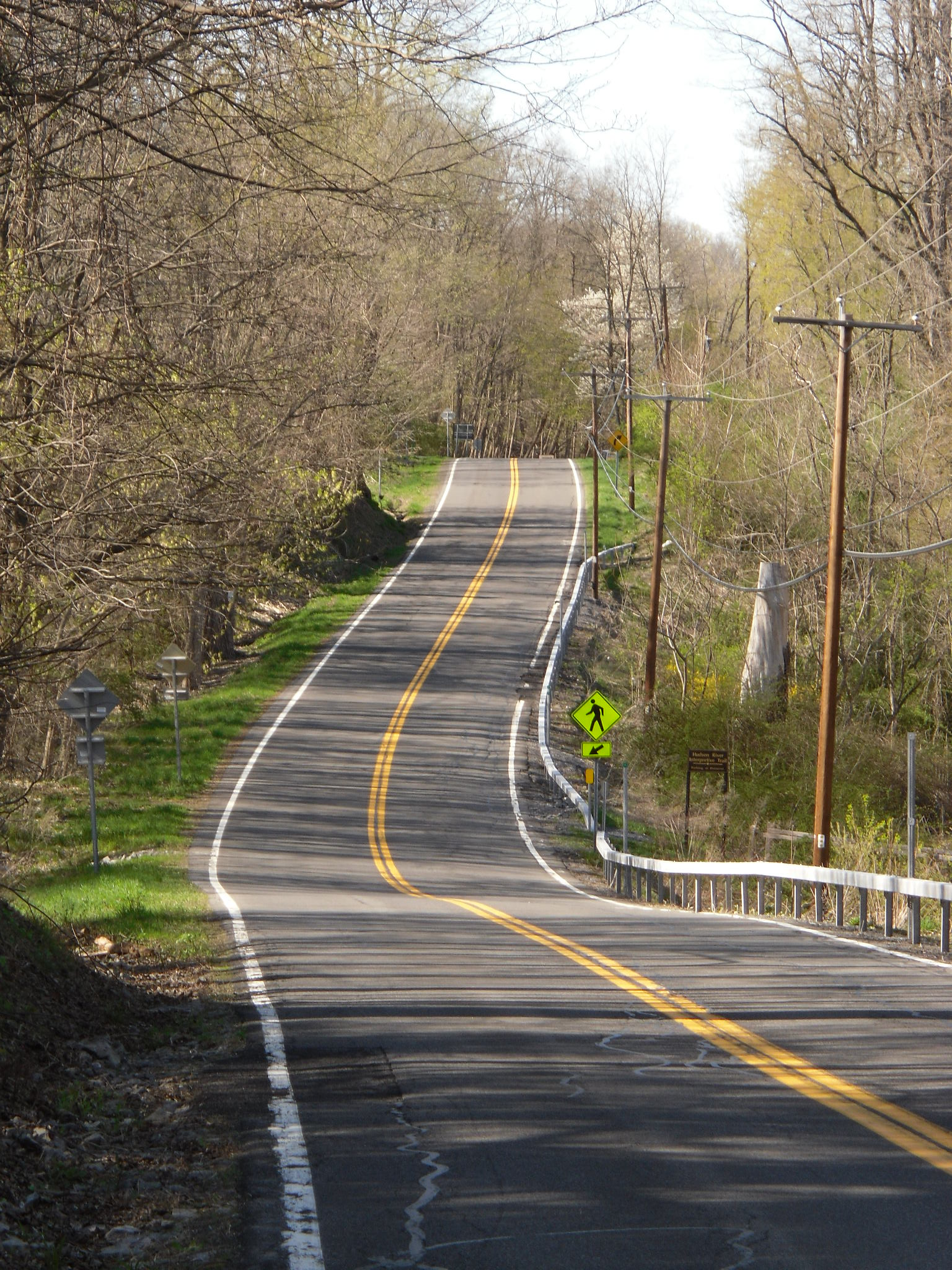
NY 144 northbound approaching the Albany County line in the town of New Baltimore

NY 144 begins at an intersection with US 9W in the town of New Baltimore, just north of US 9W's junction with County Route 51 (CR 51). The route heads northeastward through New Baltimore as a two-lane rural roadway, crossing CSX Transportation's West Shore Line before intersecting with a service road that connects to the New Baltimore Travel Plaza on the New York State Thruway (I-87). Not far from the junction, NY 144 passes by a stretch of homes alongside the Thruway and crosses over the toll road, at which point the road enters a residential but wooded area of the town. This stretch leads to the hamlet of New Baltimore, located on the west bank of the Hudson River. In the residential center of the community, NY 144 intersects with the northern terminus of CR 61 (River Road). At this junction, NY 144 makes a turn northward, following the riverbank out of the hamlet.

Continuing northward, NY 144 heads through gradually less developed areas as it crosses the Greene–Albany county line and enters the town of Coeymans. It crosses Hannacrois Creek just north of the county line on its way into the nearby hamlet of Coeymans, where the route becomes known as Main Street. NY 144 runs north–south through the small residential community, intersecting with the eastern terminus of NY 143 (Church Street) and passing over Coeymans Creek before exiting the area and becoming River Road. Outside of Coeymans, NY 144 heads northward along a strip of land bounded by Coeymans Creek to the west and the Hudson River to the east. It serves a large industrial complex and passes under a long pipeline connection in an otherwise undeveloped and wooded area before trending to the northwest toward the nearby New York State Thruway. NY 144 comes within 50 feet (15 m) of the Thruway's northbound lanes before turning back to the northeast.

The two highways remain close for the next 3.5 miles (5.6 km), with both roads continuing to traverse wooded areas of the town of Coeymans. NY 144 serves a handful of isolated housing tracts before passing over a railroad line and under the Berkshire Connector of the Thruway, which terminates just west of the overpass at Thruway exit 21A. Past the connector, the amount of development along NY 144 slowly increases as the highway crosses into the town of Bethlehem. Here, the route intersects the eastern terminus of NY 396 (Maple Avenue) just east of Selkirk and finally connects to the Thruway at the toll road's exit 22, located just north of the NY 396 junction. After the Thruway exit, the freeway heads off to the north while NY 144 takes a slightly northeasterly track toward Cedar Hill and Wemple, two small riverside hamlets about 2 miles (3.2 km) apart on opposite sides of Vioman Kill.

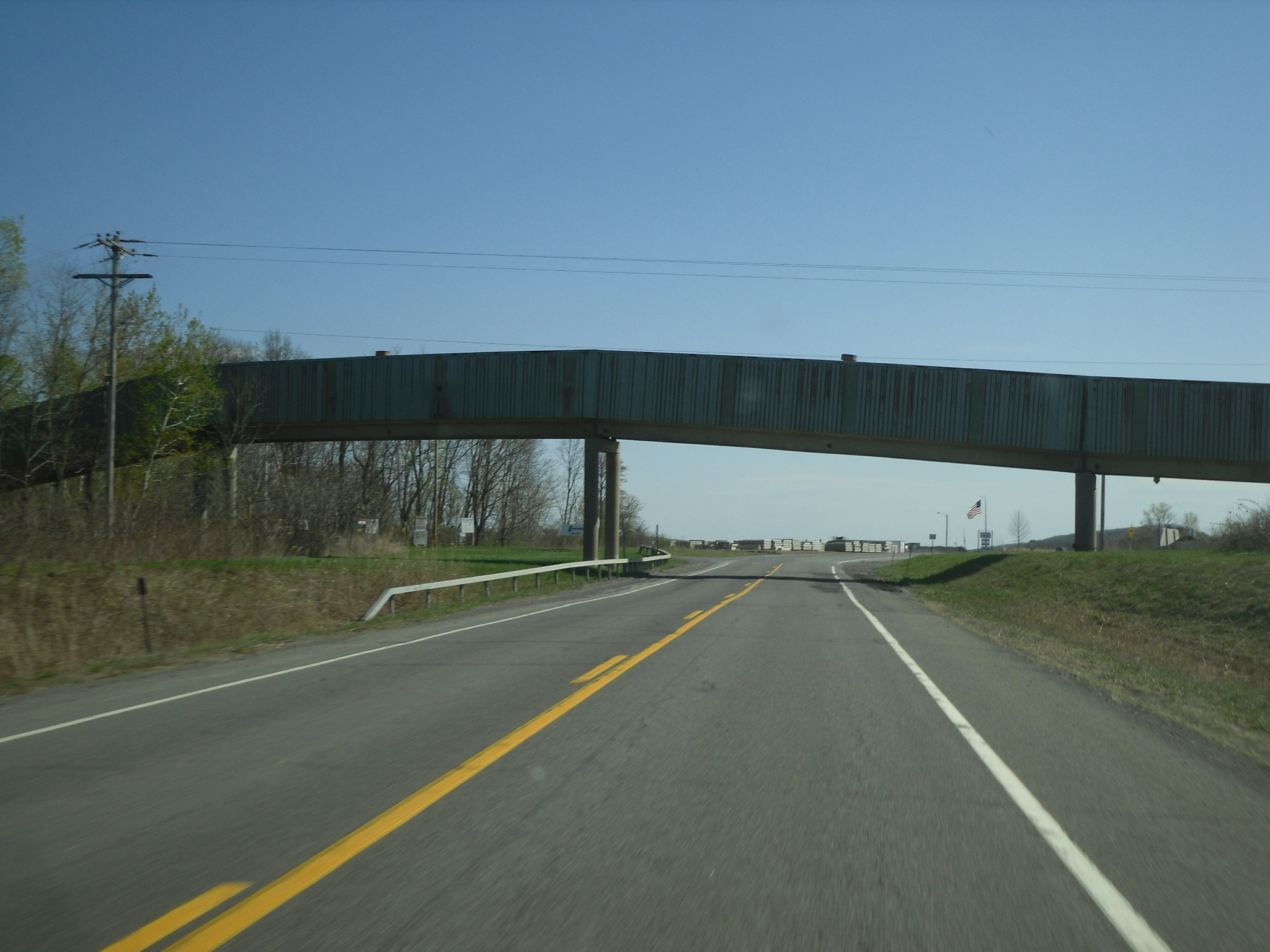
NY 144 approaching the long pipeline cover in the town of Coeymans

North of Wemple, the sporadic residences along the highway are replaced by a string of tank farms serving barges on the Hudson River. The industrial surroundings follow NY 144 into the hamlet of Glenmont, centered on the route's junction with Glenmont Road. Here, NY 144 crosses over another set of railroad tracks before heading northeastward from the community toward Normans Kill. The route runs alongside the Hudson River tributary and another set of tank farms to an intersection with NY 32 (Corning Hill Road) near the Port of Albany–Rensselaer, where the NY 144 designation terminates. NY 32 continues northward from this point on NY 144's right-of-way, becoming South Pearl Street and immediately crossing Normans Kill to enter the city of Albany.

== History ==
The first piece of NY 144 brought into the state highway system began with the portion of NY 144 between Selkirk and Greene County line as SH 508. A 4.77 miles (7.68 km) long stretch of highway, SH 508 was to cost $41,000 (1907 USD) to reconstruct to state standards. The contract was let on September 5, 1907 to the Elmore and Hamilton Contracting Company to put new limestone on the top course of the new roadway and approved stones for the bottom. Work commenced in June 1908 and was completed three months later.

Most of modern NY 144 was originally designated as part of NY 10 when the first set of posted routes in New York were assigned in 1924. NY 10 joined what is now NY 144 at Coeymans and followed it north through Bethlehem to Albany, where NY 10 continued into the city on modern NY 32. When U.S. Highways were first posted in New York in 1927, all of NY 10 south of Albany became part of US 9W. In the 1930 renumbering of state highways in New York, US 9W was realigned through the towns of New Baltimore and Coeymans to use modern NY 144 instead. At the same time, the portion of what is now US 9W from New Baltimore to Albany was designated as NY 144. The alignments of US 9W and NY 144 north of New Baltimore were flipped in April 1935. Initially, NY 144 entered Albany, overlapping with NY 32 along South Pearl Street to US 20 in the downtown district. It was truncated to its current northern terminus south of Albany in the late 1960s.

== Major intersections ==
County	Location	mi	km	Destinations	Notes
Greene	New Baltimore	0.00	0.00	US 9W – Catskill, Ravena, Albany	Southern terminus; hamlet of Hannacroix
Albany	Coeymans	4.13	6.65	NY 143 west – Ravena	Eastern terminus of NY 143; hamlet of Coeymans
Albany	Bethlehem	8.18	13.16	NY 396 west – Selkirk	Eastern terminus of NY 396
Albany	Bethlehem	8.62	13.87	I-87 Toll / New York Thruway – New York, Mass Tpke, Albany	Exit 22 on I-87 / Thruway
Albany	Bethlehem	13.72	22.08	Glenmont Road (NY 910A west) – Bethlehem Center	Former routing of NY 32; hamlet of Glenmont
Albany	Bethlehem	14.74	23.72	NY 32 to New York Thruway / US 9W	Northern terminus
1.000 mi = 1.609 km; 1.000 km = 0.621 mi: Tolled
