= New Baltimore Hamlet Historic District =

Historic district in New York, United States

- U.S. National Register of Historic Places
- U.S. Historic district
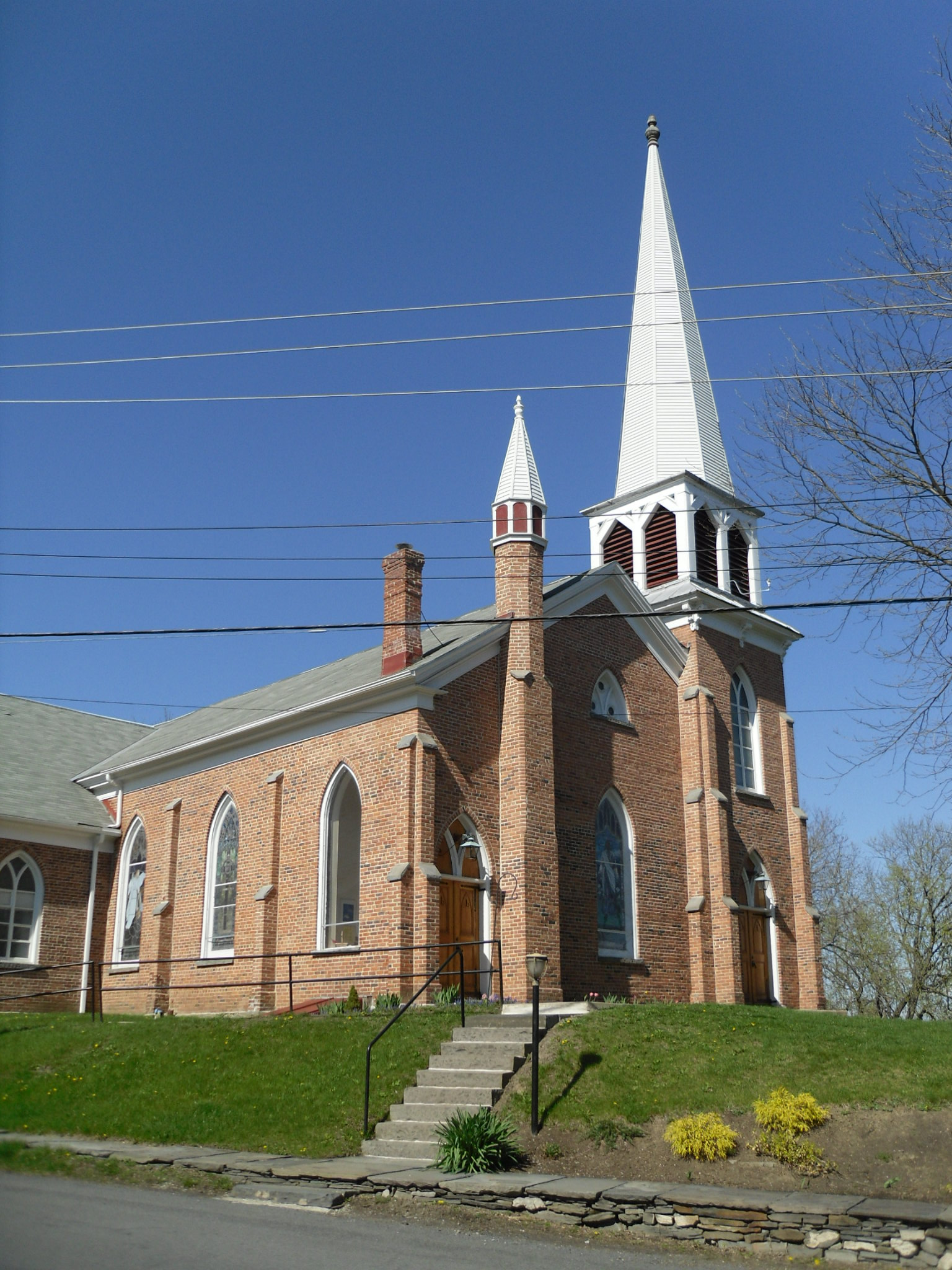
- New Baltimore Reformed Church, April 2010

- Location within New York Location within the United States
- Location: Roughly, Main St. from NY 144 to S jct. with Mill St. and along NY 144, Church and New Sts. and Washington and Madison, New Baltimore, New York
- Coordinates: 42°26′46″N 73°47′18″W
- Area: 113 acres (46 ha)
- Architectural style: Late Victorian, Greek Revival, Federal
- NRHP reference No.: 96000139
- Added to NRHP: February 23, 1996

New Baltimore Hamlet Historic District is a national historic district located at New Baltimore in Greene County, New York. The district contains 94 contributing buildings and one contributing site. It encompasses the historic core of New Baltimore and includes a collection of residential, commercial, and ecclesiastical structures. The buildings date from the late 18th to late 19th centuries. It also includes the New Baltimore Reformed Church and a historic cemetery.

It was listed on the National Register of Historic Places in 1996.
