= Earlton =

Earlton may refer to:

- Earlton, Kansas, a town in the United States
- Earlton, New York, a town in the United States
- Earlton, Ontario, a town in Canada

== See also ==
- Erlton, a neighbourhood in Calgary
