= Hannacroix, New York =

- Hamlet
- Location within New York Location within the United States
- Coordinates: 42°25′44″N 73°48′33″W
- Country: United States
- State: New York
- County: Greene
- Elevation: 190 ft (58 m)
- Time zone: UTC-5 (Eastern (EST))
  - Summer (DST): UTC-4 (EDT)
- ZIP code: 12087
- Area codes: 518 & 838
- GNIS feature ID: 972591

Hannacroix is a hamlet in the town of New Baltimore, in Greene County, New York, United States. The community is located along New York State Route 144, 2.8 miles (4.5 km) south of Ravena. Hannacroix has a post office with ZIP code 12087.
