= New York State Thruway =

System of controlled-access highways within the U.S. state of New York

New York State Thruway
- Governor Thomas E. Dewey Thruway
- Map of New York with the Thruway mainline in red; other components of the Thruway system are in blue

Route information
- Maintained by NYSTA
- Length: 496.00 mi (798.23 km)
- Existed: June 24, 1954–present
- Component highways: I-87 from Van Cortlandt Park–Yonkers line to Albany; I-287 from Elmsford to Suffern; I-90 from Albany to Pennsylvania state line
- Restrictions: No explosives on the Tappan Zee Bridge

Major junctions
- South end: I-87 at the Van Cortlandt Park–Yonkers line
- I-287 / NY 119 / Saw Mill River Parkway in Elmsford; I-287 / Route 17 in Suffern; Future I-86 in Harriman; I-84 / NY 300 in Newburgh; I-87 / I-90 in Albany; I-88 / NY 7 in Rotterdam; I-81 near Syracuse; I-390 / NY 253 in Henrietta; I-190 near Buffalo
- West end: I-90 at the Pennsylvania state line in Ripley

Location
- Country: United States
- State: New York
- Counties: Westchester, Rockland, Orange, Ulster, Greene, Albany, Schenectady, Montgomery, Herkimer, Oneida, Madison, Onondaga, Cayuga, Seneca, Ontario, Monroe, Genesee, Erie, Chautauqua

Highway system
- New York Highways; Interstate; US; State; Reference; Parkways

The New York State Thruway (officially the Governor Thomas E. Dewey Thruway and colloquially "the Thruway") is a system of controlled-access toll roads spanning 569.83 miles (917.05 km) within the U.S. state of New York. It is operated by the New York State Thruway Authority (NYSTA), a New York State public-benefit corporation. The 496.00-mile (798.23 km) mainline is a freeway that extends from the New York City line at Yonkers to the Pennsylvania state line at Ripley by way of I-87 and I-90 through Albany, Syracuse, and Buffalo. According to the International Bridge, Tunnel and Turnpike Association, the Thruway is the fifth-busiest toll road in the United States. The toll road is also a major route for long distance travelers linking the cities of Toronto, Buffalo, and Montreal with Boston and New York City.

A tolled highway connecting the major cities of New York was first proposed in 1949. The first section of the Thruway, between Lowell, New York (south of Rome) and Rochester, opened on June 24, 1954. The remainder of the mainline was opened in 1955, and many of its spurs connecting to highways in other states and the Canadian province of Ontario were built in the 1950s. In 1957, much of the Thruway system was included as portions of Interstate 87 (I-87), I-90, and I-95. Other segments became part of I-190 and I-287 shortly afterward. Today, the system comprises six highways: the New York–Ripley mainline, the Berkshire Connector, the Garden State Parkway Connector, the New England Thruway (I-95), the Niagara Thruway (I-190), and the Cross Westchester Expressway (I-287). The portion of I-84 in New York was maintained by the Thruway Authority from 1991 to 2010, but it was never part of the Thruway system and is currently maintained by the New York State Department of Transportation (NYSDOT).

The Thruway formerly utilized a combination of closed (ticket-based), and open (barrier-based) tolling. From 2016 to 2018, all flat-rate barriers on the Thruway system transitioned to open road tolling, which replaced cash payment with an all-electronic tolling system using E-ZPass and toll by mail. On November 13, 2020, both ticket systems on the Thruway were converted to open road tolling. The Garden State Parkway Connector, the Cross Westchester Expressway and the section of the mainline in and around Buffalo are toll-free. Motorists with E-ZPasses receive a greater discount on the toll-by-mail rate than out-of-state E-ZPass members do. The Thruway is partly subsidized by the tolls, whereas other parts are subsidized by NYSDOT, a 50/50 for the toll-free areas, and cashless/tolled areas.

== Route description ==
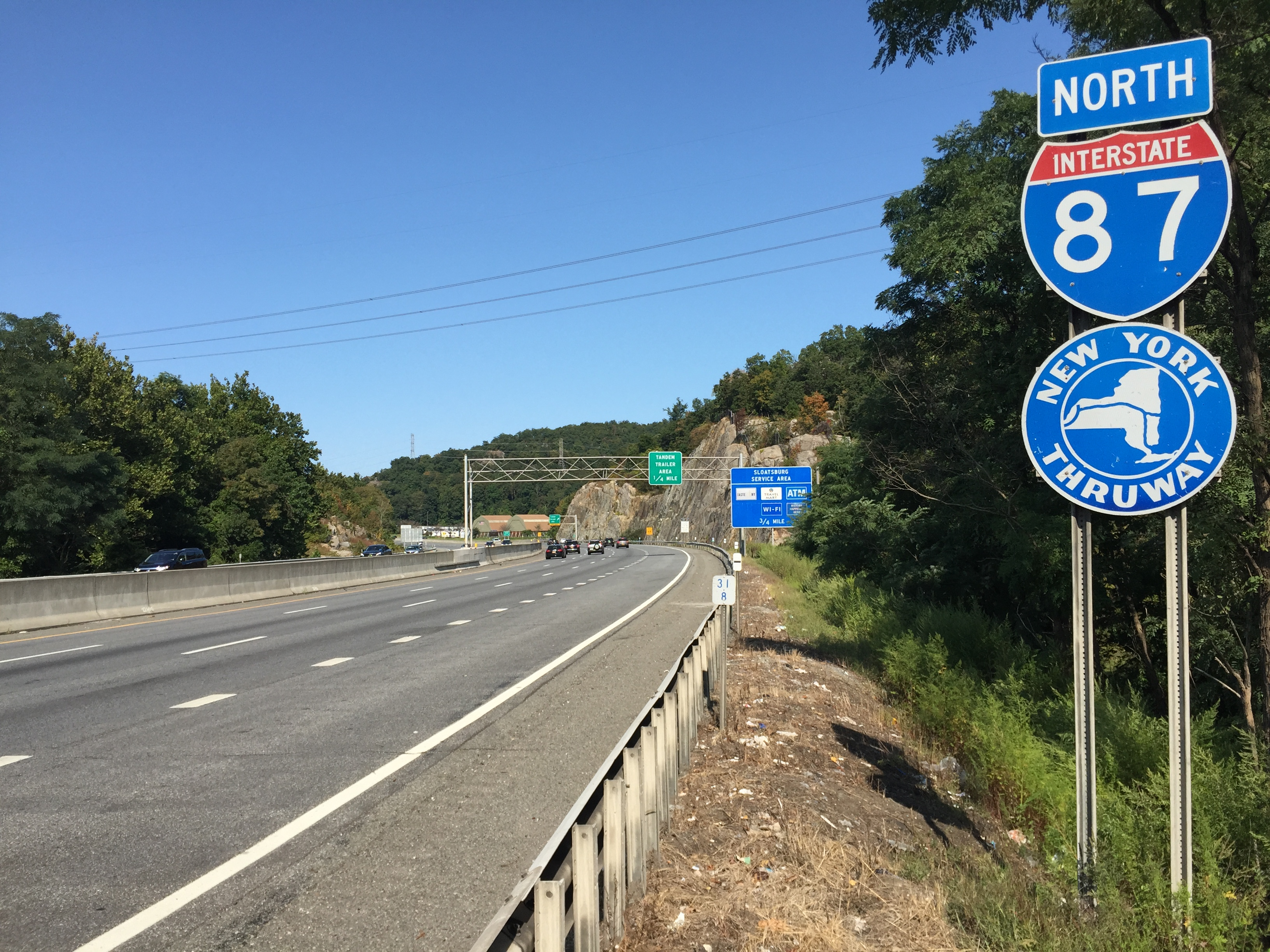
View north along the thruway in Ramapo

The New York State Thruway system is a collection of six individual components across the state of New York that connect the state to four neighboring states (Connecticut, Massachusetts, New Jersey, and Pennsylvania) as well as the Canadian province of Ontario. Together, the highways extend for 569.83 miles (917.05 km), making the Thruway system one of the largest toll highway systems in the United States. The longest of the six components is the 496-mile (798 km) mainline. Of the 570 miles in the Thruway system, 560.85 miles (902.60 km) (98.4%) carries at least one Interstate Highway designation. Only three sections of the system are not part of the Interstate Highway System; these are the Garden State Parkway Connector in Rockland County, a 6-mile (10 km) portion of the Berkshire Connector between its western terminus at exit 21A on the mainline near Selkirk and where it joins up with Interstate 90 at exit B1 in Schodack, and a short section of the mainline within exit 24 in Albany that is located between where I-87 departs the roadway and I-90 enters it. They are designated as New York State Route 982L (NY 982L), NY 912M, and NY 915H, respectively, all unsigned reference routes. The speed limit, enforced by the New York State Police, is 65 miles per hour along most of the Thruway. The main exceptions to this are in the suburbs and city of Buffalo and in Westchester and Rockland counties. There, the speed limit is 55 miles per hour.

I-90, which comprises the bulk of the mainline and the Berkshire Connector, runs for 365.55 miles (588.30 km) along the Thruway: 17.70 miles (28.49 km) as part of the Berkshire Connector and 347.85 miles (559.81 km) on the mainline. I-87 comprises the remaining 148.15 miles (238.42 km) of the mainline, including an 18.86-mile (30.35 km) concurrency with I-287 north of New York City. I-287 covers another 29.76 miles (47.89 km) (including the 18.86 miles (30.35 km) shared with I-87), while I-190 spans 21.24 miles (34.18 km) and I-95 covers 15.01 miles (24.16 km).

All highways maintained by the New York State Thruway Authority (NYSTA) lack the reference markers that exist on all New York State Department of Transportation-maintained roads, as would be expected. In their place, NYSTA-controlled roadways use small, square tenth-mile markers with a white background and blue numbering. These markers differ from the white-on-green reference markers used by NYSDOT on state-maintained highways, which are 10 inches (254 mm) high and 8 inches (203 mm) wide and display a limited amount of mileage information on their third row.

=== Mainline ===
==== South of Albany ====
The mainline of the Thruway begins (in terms of exit numbers and mileposts) as a continuation of the Major Deegan Expressway, carrying I-87 northward into Westchester County from New York City at the border between Yonkers and the Bronx. The first few exits serve various local streets and destinations in the city. At exit 4, I-87 connects to the Cross County Parkway, an east-west parkway providing access to the Saw Mill River, Bronx River, and Hutchinson River parkways, all of which run parallel to the Thruway through Yonkers. The Hutchinson River and Bronx River parkways leave to the northeast midway through Yonkers, while the Saw Mill and Sprain Brook parkways follow the Thruway out of the city. Exit 5 connects to Central Park Avenue (NY 100) which connects towards White Plains. After that, exit 6 connects to Tuckahoe Road, connecting towards Yonkers and Bronxville. The last free exit heading northbound is exit 6A; travel farther north requires a toll payment at the Yonkers toll gantry.

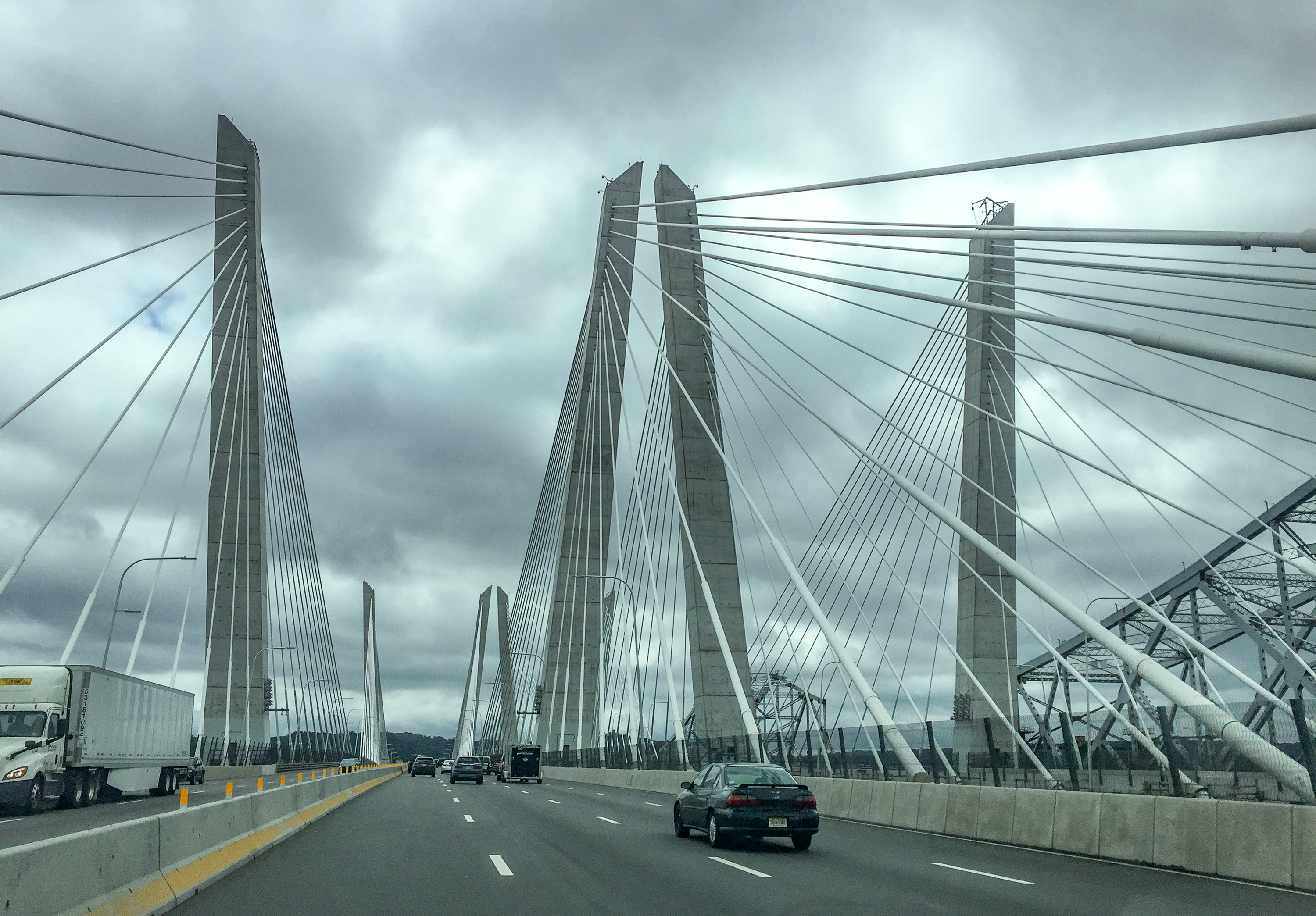
Tappan Zee Bridge (I-87 and I-287)

After the toll, the thruway continues to exit 7, which grants access to Ardsley and Saw Mill River Road. All three highways take generally parallel tracks to Elmsford, where I-87 directly intersects the Saw Mill River Parkway at exit 7A. Not far to the north is exit 8, a semi-directional T interchange with I-287 (the Cross Westchester Expressway). I-287 joins the Thruway here, following I-87 west across the Hudson River into Rockland County on the Tappan Zee Bridge. I-87 and I-287 remain overlapped for 15 miles (24 km) through the densely populated southern portion of Rockland County, meeting the Palisades Interstate Parkway (exit 13) and the Garden State Parkway Connector, the latter of which provides access to the Garden State Parkway (exit 14A) in New Jersey. The Thruway continues generally westward to Suffern, where I-87 and I-287 split at a large semi-directional T interchange (exit 15) near the New Jersey border. At this point, I-287 heads south into New Jersey while I-87 and the Thruway turn northward into the valley of the Ramapo River. NY 17 northbound briefly joins the Thruway at the interchange with I-287 in Suffern, and leaves the Thruway a half-mile north at exit 15A in Hillburn.

The Thruway continues north through the river valley toward Harriman, where it encounters the Woodbury toll gantry, the southeastern end of the mainline's major closed toll system. The gantry is located on the mainline within exit 16 (NY 17), a trumpet interchange. Along with the mainline gantry in Harriman, a toll gantry exists on future I-86 midway between the Thruway and NY 17. Now a completely tolled highway, the Thruway heads northward, roughly paralleling the Hudson River to the river's west as it serves the city of Newburgh, the village of New Paltz, and the city of Kingston, connecting to the short I-587 in the latter.

Past Kingston, the highway runs closer to the river as it parallels U.S. Route 9W (US 9W) through the towns of Saugerties, Catskill, Coxsackie, and Ravena. Just north of Ravena, the Thruway meets the west end of the Berkshire Connector, a spur linking the Thruway mainline to the Massachusetts Turnpike 25 miles (40 km) to the east. The highway continues into Albany, where it connects to Troy via I-787 at exit 23 and intersects I-90 at exit 24. The latter of the two junctions is the busiest of the Thruway's exits, serving an estimated 27 million vehicles a year. I-87 leaves the Thruway mainline here, and the Thruway briefly becomes the unsigned reference route NY 915H, before I-90 merges into it, following the Thruway northwestward toward Schenectady.

==== Albany to Syracuse ====
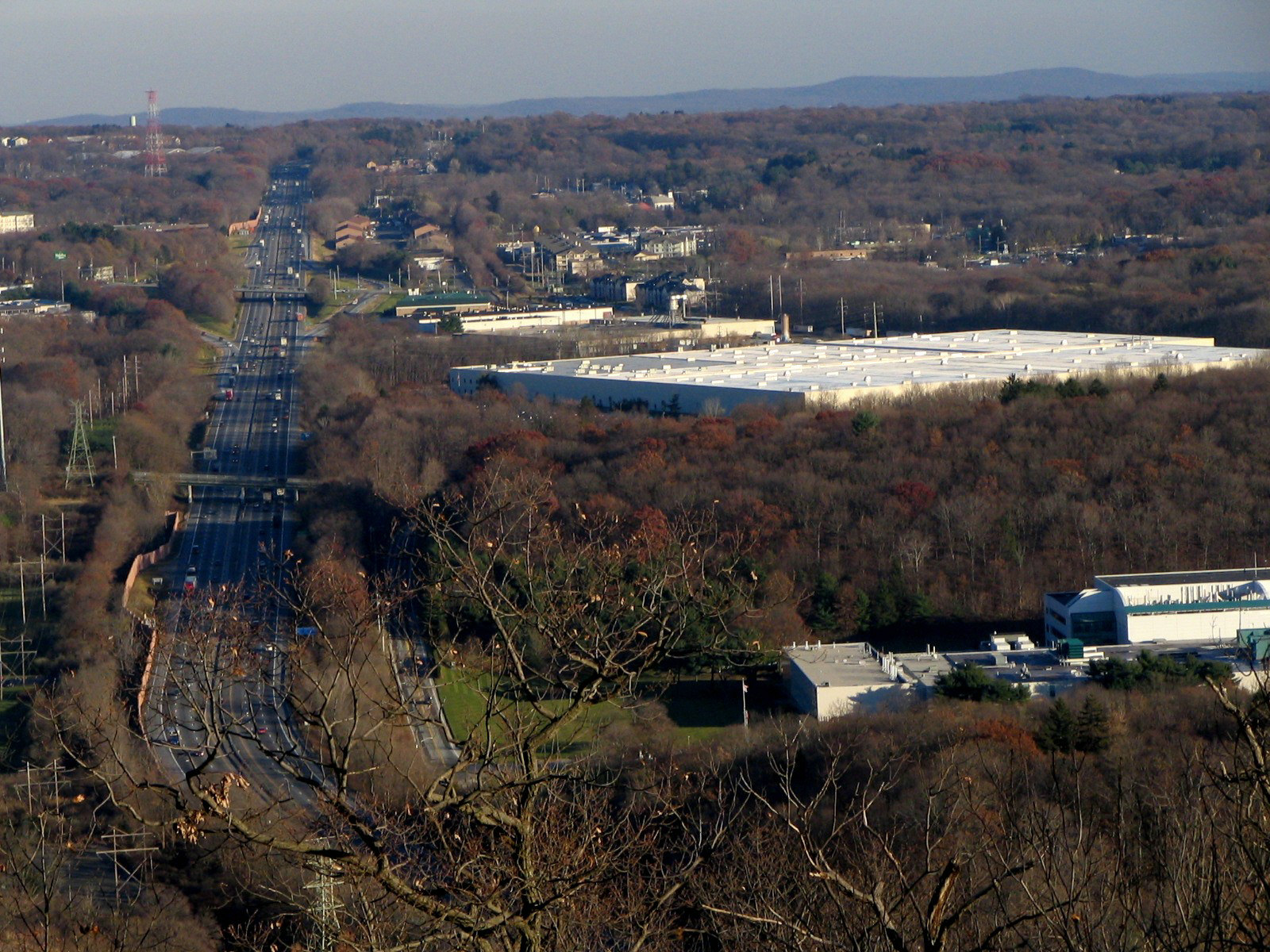
The New York State Thruway (I-87) looking east from Nordkop Mountain in Suffern

South of Schenectady, but still in Albany County, the Thruway and I-90 meet I-890, a loop route of I-90 that directly serves the downtown district of Schenectady, at exit 25. The Thruway, meanwhile, bypasses the city to the south and west, intersecting I-88 at exit 25A in Rotterdam before reuniting with I-890 at exit 26 west of Scotia. Travel between I-88 (Exit 25A) and exits 24, 25, and 26 in either direction is toll-free. From exit 26 west to Utica, the mainline of the Thruway parallels the Erie Canal and the Mohawk River, crossing over the water-bodies at Mohawk. In between Schenectady and Utica, I-90 and the Thruway serve several riverside communities, including the cities of Amsterdam (exit 27 via NY 30) and Little Falls (exit 29A, NY 169) and the villages of Fonda (exit 28, NY 30A), Canajoharie (exit 29, NY 5S and NY 10), and Herkimer (exit 30, NY 28).

Like Schenectady before it, the Thruway bypasses downtown Utica, following an alignment north of the city while I-790 serves it directly. I-790 breaks from the Thruway at exit 31 and runs along two carriageways flanking the mainline on both sides for 1.5 miles (2.4 km) before turning southward onto the North-South Arterial. The adjacent highways become NY 49, which parallels the Thruway for another 2 miles (3.2 km) northwestward. At the end of this stretch, the Thruway turns slightly southwestward, crossing over the Mohawk River and the Erie Canal while NY 49 continues northwestward along the northern bank of the water-bodies toward Rome. On the other side of the river, the Thruway curves back to the west, proceeding to exit 32 in Westmoreland.

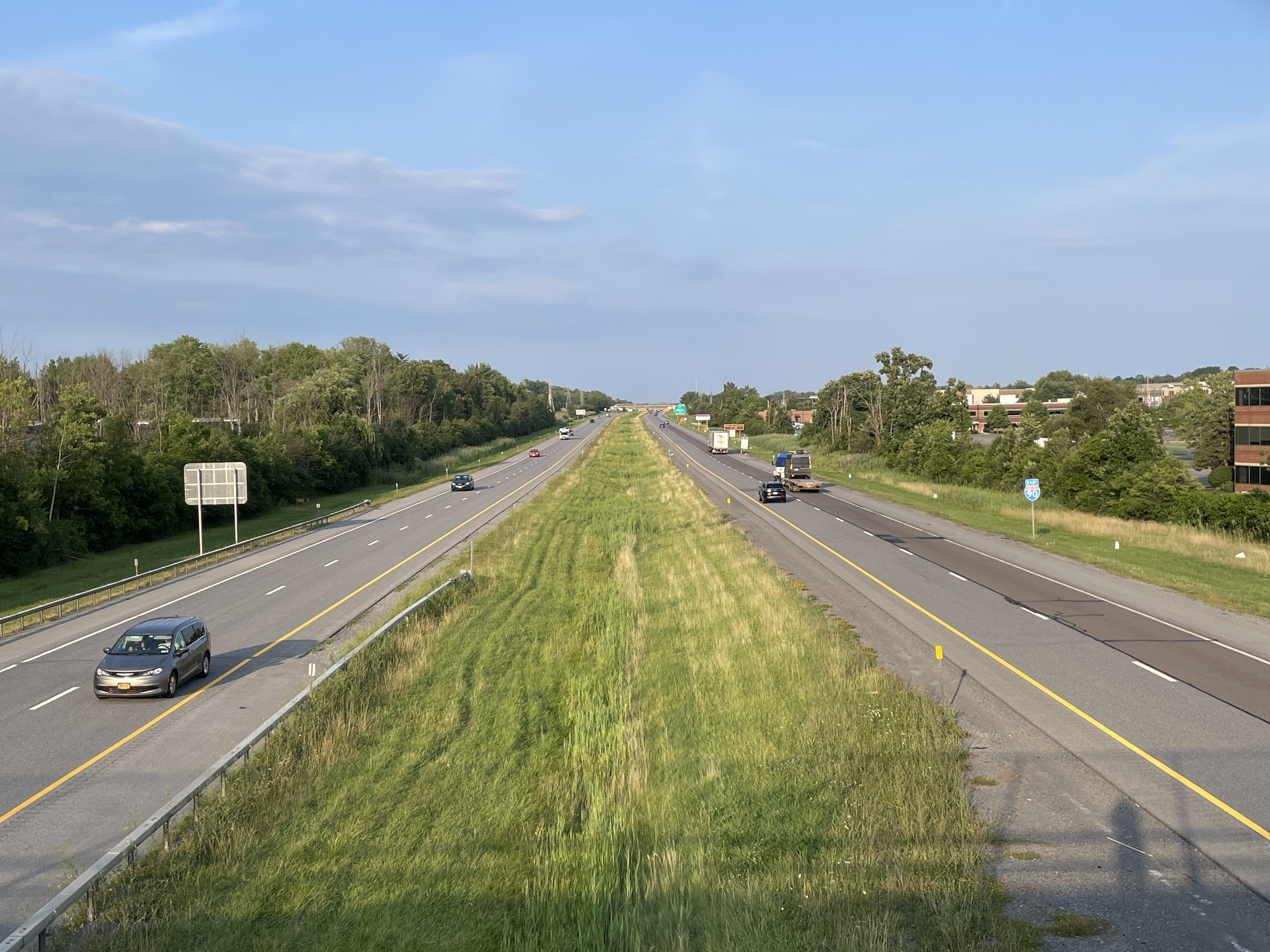
New York State Thruway (I-90) eastbound past NY 298 in East Syracuse

Not far to the west, the Thruway has a junction with NY 365 at exit 33 in Verona. Here, the Thruway connects to the cities of Rome and Oneida and serves the Turning Stone Resort & Casino via NY 365. The highway continues onward through a sparsely populated area between Verona and Syracuse, passing roughly 5 miles (8 km) south of Oneida Lake as it connects to the village of Canastota by way of NY 13 at exit 34. As the highway approaches exit 34A (I-481) outside of Syracuse, the surroundings become more developed. The level of development rises sharply west of I-481 as the Thruway enters Salina, a northern suburb of Syracuse. Within Salina, I-90 and the Thruway intersect I-81, which connects the Thruway to both downtown Syracuse and Syracuse Hancock International Airport.

==== Syracuse to Buffalo ====
West of Salina, the Thruway passes north of Liverpool and Onondaga Lake before intersecting I-690 and its northern continuation, NY 690, at exit 39 in Van Buren. At this point, the amount of development along the Thruway sharply declines as it heads generally westward through a marshy area of Onondaga County. I-90 and the Thruway reconnect to the Erie Canal (here part of the Seneca River) at the western county line. Now in Cayuga County, the highway serves Weedsport via exit 40 and NY 34, exit 41 serving Del Lago Resort and Casino in Tyre, New York and passes north of Port Byron prior to entering Seneca County and the Montezuma National Wildlife Refuge. Here, the canal leaves the Thruway for good, turning northwestward to follow the NY 31 corridor to Rochester and beyond.

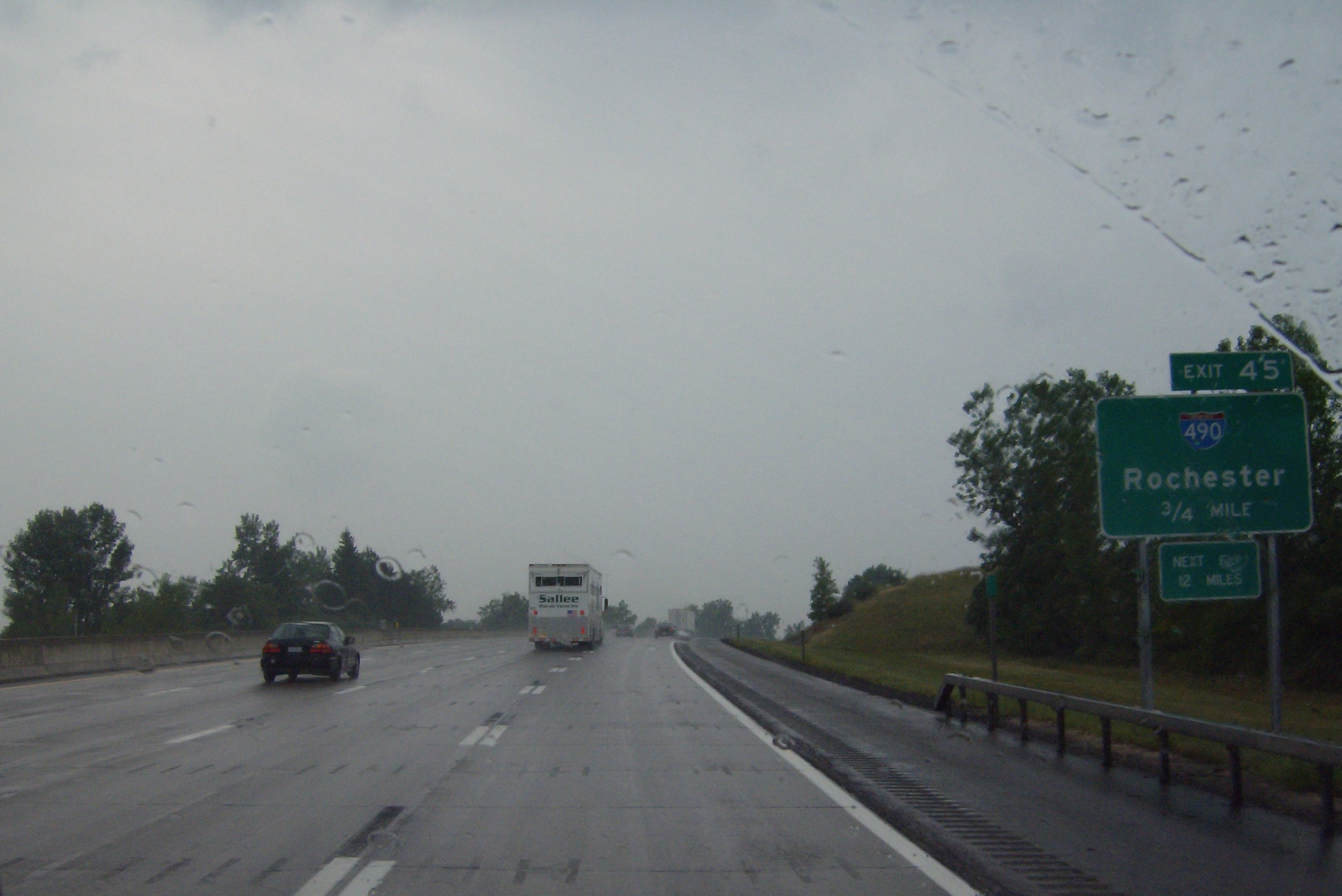
Advance signage for exit 45 (I-490)

The portion of the Thruway between Montezuma and the Rochester area is one of mostly rural nature, with the highway passing through remote, open fields, and for the most part avoiding highly populated areas. Along this stretch, it connects to two cities, both located well to the south of the Thruway: Geneva by way of exit 42 for NY 14 and Canandaigua by way of exit 43 via NY 21. The next exit along the highway, exit 44 for NY 332, also serves Canandaigua; the junction is the primary exit for Canandaigua-bound travelers from the Rochester area. Here, the Thruway temporarily widens from four to six lanes as it continues generally westward to meet I-490 at exit 45 near Victor. As in the vicinity of Schenectady and Utica, an auxiliary route of I-90—here I-490—directly serves a city (Rochester) while the Thruway bypasses it.

It heads northwestward through the city's southern, mostly rural suburbs to Henrietta, where it meets I-390 at exit 46. Henrietta is as close as the Thruway gets to downtown as it proceeds west to Le Roy, where I-490 reconnects to I-90 at exit 47. I-90 continues onward into Genesee County, intersecting with NY 98 at exit 48 north of Batavia and NY 77 at exit 48A in Pembroke. The latter exit provides access to Six Flags Darien Lake, a large amusement park located in the town of Darien. I-90 and the Thruway continue into Erie County and the Buffalo area. It meets NY 78 at exit 49 near Depew before passing to the north of Buffalo Niagara International Airport and reaching the Williamsville toll gantry, which marks the northwestern end of the major closed toll system.

==== West of Buffalo ====
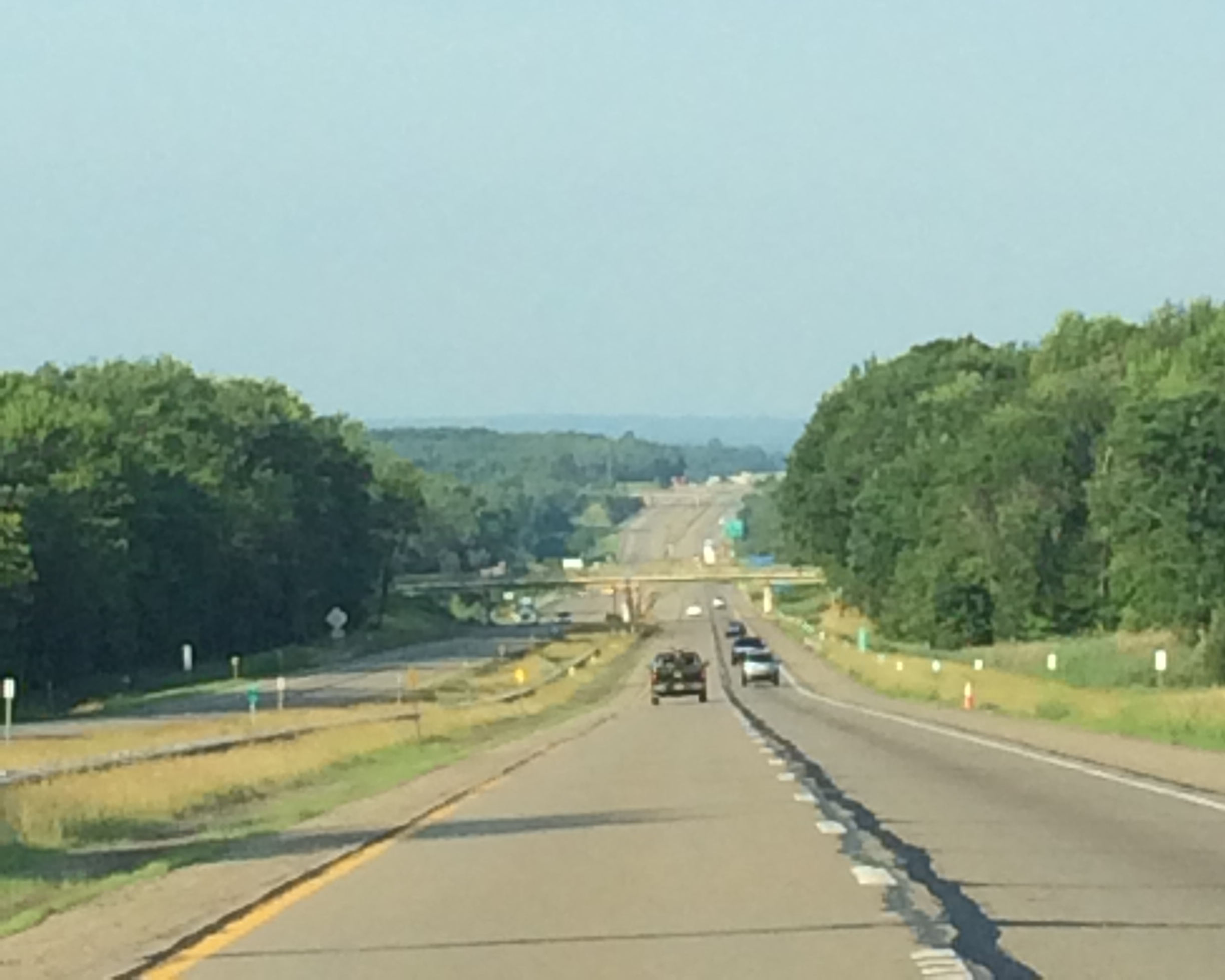
NYS Thruway near Silver Creek

Just west of the toll gantry, I-90 and the Thruway—now toll-free—connect to I-290 via exit 50, a semi-directional T interchange. At this point, the Thruway turns southward, passing through the immediate eastern suburbs of Buffalo. As it heads south, it meets the Kensington Expressway (NY 33) at exit 51 and Walden Avenue at exit 52, both cloverleaf interchanges. At exit 52, it passes to the west of the Walden Galleria, a shopping mall situated at the nearby junction of Walden Avenue and NY 277. Two exits later in southern Cheektowaga, I-90 meets I-190, a spur route leading to downtown Buffalo and Niagara Falls, at exit 53.

South of the city, the Thruway meets the Aurora Expressway (NY 400) and the Southern Expressway (US 219) at exits 54 and 55, respectively, in West Seneca. Just southwest of exit 55, I-90 and the Thruway pass through the Lackawanna toll gantry, which serves as the northeast end of the minor closed toll system. Once again a toll road, the Thruway heads southwestward, roughly paralleling the shoreline of Lake Erie to Blasdell, where it connects to NY 179 (the Milestrip Expressway). Farther southwestward, the Thruway is joined by US 20, which follows a parallel routing to that of the Thruway to the Pennsylvania state line.

As the route passes from Erie County to Chautauqua County, the last on its routing, it cuts through the northwestern portion of the Cattaraugus Indian Reservation, situated on Cattaraugus Creek. The Thruway continues alongside US 20 past Dunkirk and Westfield to the Ripley toll gantry, the southwestern end of the minor closed toll system just northeast of exit 61 for Shortman Road. Travelers heading eastbound from Pennsylvania can access Shortman Road toll-free. The Thruway ends about 1 mile (1.6 km) after exit 61 at the Pennsylvania state line. I-90, however, continues onward into Pennsylvania as a toll-free highway.

=== Berkshire Connector ===
The Berkshire Connector is a 24.28-mile (39.07 km) east–west spur connecting the Thruway mainline in Coeymans to the Massachusetts Turnpike at the Massachusetts state line in Canaan. It is tolled as part of the closed toll system in place on the mainline between exits 16 and 50. The highway begins at exit 21A off the Thruway southwest of Selkirk in the town of Coeymans (south of Albany) as NY 912M, an unsigned reference route. It proceeds eastward over the Hudson River and into Rensselaer County by way of the Castleton Bridge. It navigates through the southern, rural portion of the county to exit B1 in Schodack, where the connector meets I-90. The unsigned NY 912M designation terminates here while I-90 joins the Berkshire Connector and follows the spur east into Columbia County.

While the Rensselaer County segment follows a mostly east–west routing, the Berkshire Connector in Columbia County takes on a northwest-southeast alignment as the roadway heads towards exit B2 in East Chatham. The junction serves as the northern terminus of the Taconic State Parkway, which connects the spur to the New York City area. About 2 miles (3.2 km) to the southeast is the Canaan toll gantry, which marks the end of the Thruway ticket system. The last exit on the Berkshire Connector is exit B3 for NY 22 just west of the Massachusetts state line in Canaan. The spur continues east to the state line, where it becomes the Massachusetts Turnpike.

=== Garden State Parkway Connector ===
The Garden State Parkway Connector is a 2.40-mile (3.86 km) highway that connects the Thruway mainline at exit 14A in Ramapo with the Garden State Parkway at the New Jersey state line. It is designated as NY 982L, an unsigned reference route. The highway begins, in terms of mileposts, at Thruway (I-87 and I-287) exit 14A in Ramapo and heads generally southwestward as a toll-free highway toward the state line. Just north of the state line, the southbound connector meets Red Schoolhouse Road (County Route 41 or CR 41) at a partial diamond interchange. All southbound trucks are forced to exit here, as the Garden State Parkway prohibits trucks north of exit 105. Thus, the final 0.31 miles (0.50 km) of the road south of the Red Schoolhouse Road exit is the only part of the Thruway system that prohibits trucks. The connector continues to the state line, where it becomes the tolled Garden State Parkway.

=== Other components ===
The New York State Thruway system also consists of three other components: the New England Thruway, the Cross Westchester Expressway, and the Niagara Thruway. The New England Thruway (NET) is a 15.01-mile (24.16 km) section of Interstate 95 under the operation and maintenance of the New York State Thruway Authority. It begins at the Pelham Parkway interchange (exit 8) in the Co-op City section of the Bronx and continues northeastward into Westchester County to the Connecticut state line, where it connects to the Connecticut Turnpike. The Cross Westchester Expressway, part of I-287, begins at I-87 exit 8 in Elmsford, where I-287 splits from the Thruway mainline, and travels east across Westchester County to I-95, with connections to both the New England Thruway and the Connecticut Turnpike at exit 12 in Rye. The Niagara Thruway comprises the first 21.24 miles (34.18 km) of I-190 from I-90 in Buffalo to NY 384 in Niagara Falls.

== History ==
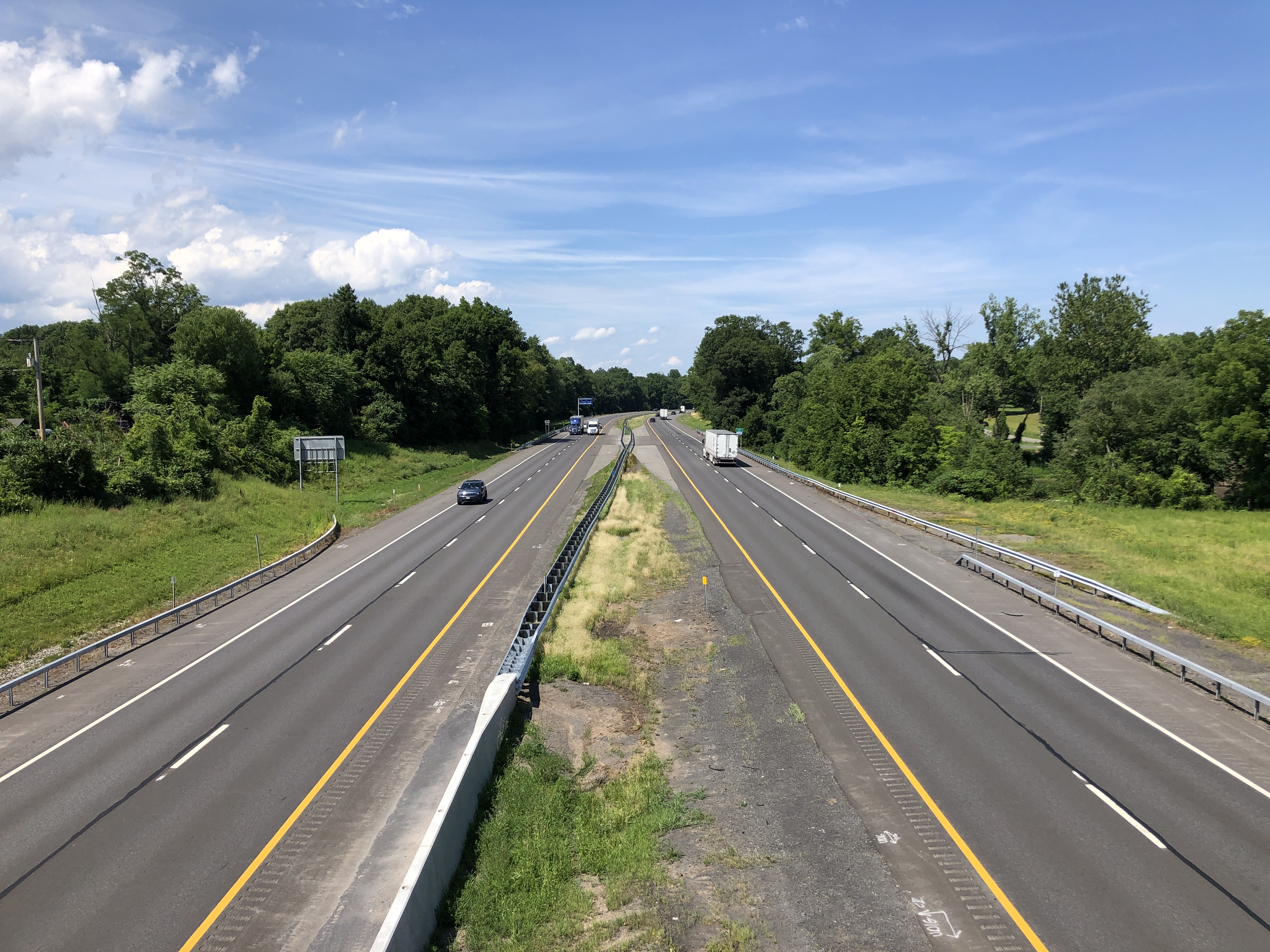
New York State Thruway (I-87) northbound in Ulster

A toll superhighway connecting the major cities of the state of New York that would become part of a larger nationwide highway network was proposed as early as 1949. The following year, the New York State Legislature passed the Thruway Authority Act creating the New York State Thruway Authority (NYSTA), an independent public corporation, which would build and manage the Thruway. The project was to be financed through toll revenue bonds and self-liquidating by receipt of tolls, rents, concessions, and other income. The act also stipulated NYSTA adopt a hybrid system of tolls, with barrier tolls collected in urban areas, and long-distance tickets issued in rural areas.

The first section of Thruway, a 115-mile stretch from Lowell to Rochester, opened on June 24, 1954. Other sections of the 426-mile (686 km) mainline between Buffalo and the Bronx were completed and opened throughout 1954 and 1955. The last segment, from Yonkers south to the Bronx, was completed on August 31, 1956. The total cost was $600 million (equivalent to $5.43 billion in 2025), financed by the sale of $972 million in bonds (equivalent to $8.8 billion in 2025). At the time, it was the longest toll road in the world. In 1957, the mainline was extended 70 miles (113 km) west from Buffalo along Lake Erie to the Pennsylvania state line.

From 1957 to 1960, several spurs of the road were built to connect the road to turnpikes in adjacent states. These include the Berkshire Connector (May 26, 1959), which connects to the Massachusetts Turnpike, the New England Thruway (October 31, 1958) and Cross Westchester Expressway (December 1, 1960), which both connect to the Connecticut Turnpike, and the Niagara Thruway (July 30, 1959), which connects to Canada's Queen Elizabeth Way via a border crossing near Niagara Falls. The Thruway also directly connects to New Jersey's tolled Garden State Parkway, which eventually connects to the New Jersey Turnpike, which is part of a toll road system linking New York City and Chicago that also uses tolled highways in Pennsylvania, Ohio, and Indiana.

On August 14, 1957, the east-west segment of the mainline between the Pennsylvania border on Lake Erie and the Adirondack Northway in Albany became part of I-90 while the north-south portions from the Northway south to Newburgh and from Elmsford south to the New York City line were included in I-87. Between Elmsford and Newburgh, I-87 followed I-287, what is now I-684, and I-84. Upon its completion, the Berkshire Connector east of US 9 also became part of I-90, creating a gap in the I-90 designation around Albany until the completion of the 20-mile-long (32 km) Albany-Schodack Freeway in the early 1970s, which is not part of the Thruway system. The entirety of the New England Thruway became part of I-95 upon completion while the Niagara Thruway became I-90N in 1957 when it was built through downtown Buffalo, and later I-190 in 1959 upon completion. The Elmsford–Suffern section of the mainline was designated as part of I-287 upon completion of the Cross Westchester Expressway (also I-287) in 1960.

The highway was distinctive in that original signage utilized dark blue backgrounds, the same color blue as displayed on the New York state flag. Over time, these signs were replaced with Federal Highway Administration (FHWA)-approved green backgrounds.

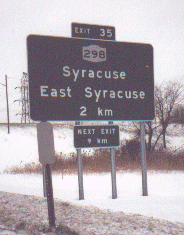
In the late 1970s, NYSTA experimented with all-metric signage in the Syracuse area, such as these signs at exit 35.

On September 1, 1964, the New York State Legislature officially renamed the Thruway in honor of Thomas E. Dewey, the Governor of New York at the time of the Thruway's opening. The official designation is, however, rarely used in reference to the road.

The last section of the mainline to receive a designation—from Suffern to Newburgh—finally received one on January 1, 1970, when I-87 was realigned to follow the Thruway for its entire length south of Albany and the former portion of I-87 between White Plains and Brewster became I-684.

On February 28, 1974, exit 14B was opened.

The closed-toll (originally ticket) system originally began at Spring Valley but was moved to Woodbury on March 3, 1974, allowing interchanges along the Thruway in Rockland County to be free of tolls. The Suffern toll plaza was demolished soon after this change.

In 1984, the New Rochelle toll barrier was widened by four booths.

The Schoharie Creek Bridge was a Thruway bridge over the Schoharie Creek near Fort Hunter and the Mohawk River. On April 5, 1987, it collapsed due to bridge scour at the foundations after a record rainfall. At the time of the collapse, one car and one tractor-semitrailer were on the bridge. Before the road could be blocked off, three more cars drove into the gap. The collapse killed ten people. The replacement bridge was completed and fully open to traffic on May 21, 1988.

In 1994, exit 5 was rebuilt, replacing the original trumpet interchange with a more complex configuration. Part of the old interchange was not entirely demolished however.

The Spring Valley barrier's car toll was removed in July 1997. At the time, the toll was $0.40 (equivalent to $1.00 in 2025).

In August 1993, NYSTA became the first agency to implement the E-ZPass electronic toll collection system. By December 1996, it was implemented at all of the Thruway's fixed-toll barriers and at exits along the Berkshire Connector and the New York City–Buffalo section of the mainline. E-ZPass was installed at all of the mainline exits by March 1998.

In 1999, NYSDOT, the Federal Highway Administration and NYSTA discussed making the entire Berkshire Connector part of I-90 and redesignating the non-toll part of I-90 from Thruway exit 24 to exit B1 as I-88. The Thruway main line would be designated as both I-90 and I-88 between exits 25A and 24, and as I-90 and I-87 from exit 24 to exit 21A. This was never implemented, as the FHWA wished to preserve the I-88 numbering for a potential future corridor connecting Albany and northern interior New England.

When I-84 was built through the Newburgh area in the early 1960s, no interchange was built between I-84 and the Thruway. Instead, the connection was made via a short segment of NY 300, which both I-84 and I-87 meet via interchanges. Construction on a direct connection between the Thruway mainline and I-84 began in August 2003. The portion of the exit carrying traffic from I-84 to the Thruway was opened in July 2009, and the opposite direction was opened two months later on September 23. The connection allows cars to travel between I-87, I-84 and NY 300 via splits in the ramp. The ramps connecting the Thruway's interchange with NY 300 were demolished, and the ramp connecting the interchange with NY 17K was converted into an E-ZPass-only exit for northbound Thruway traffic.

On May 14, 2010, two E-ZPass express lanes in each direction were opened at the Woodbury toll plaza, with concrete barriers separating the faster traffic from the staffed toll lanes utilized by cash customers.

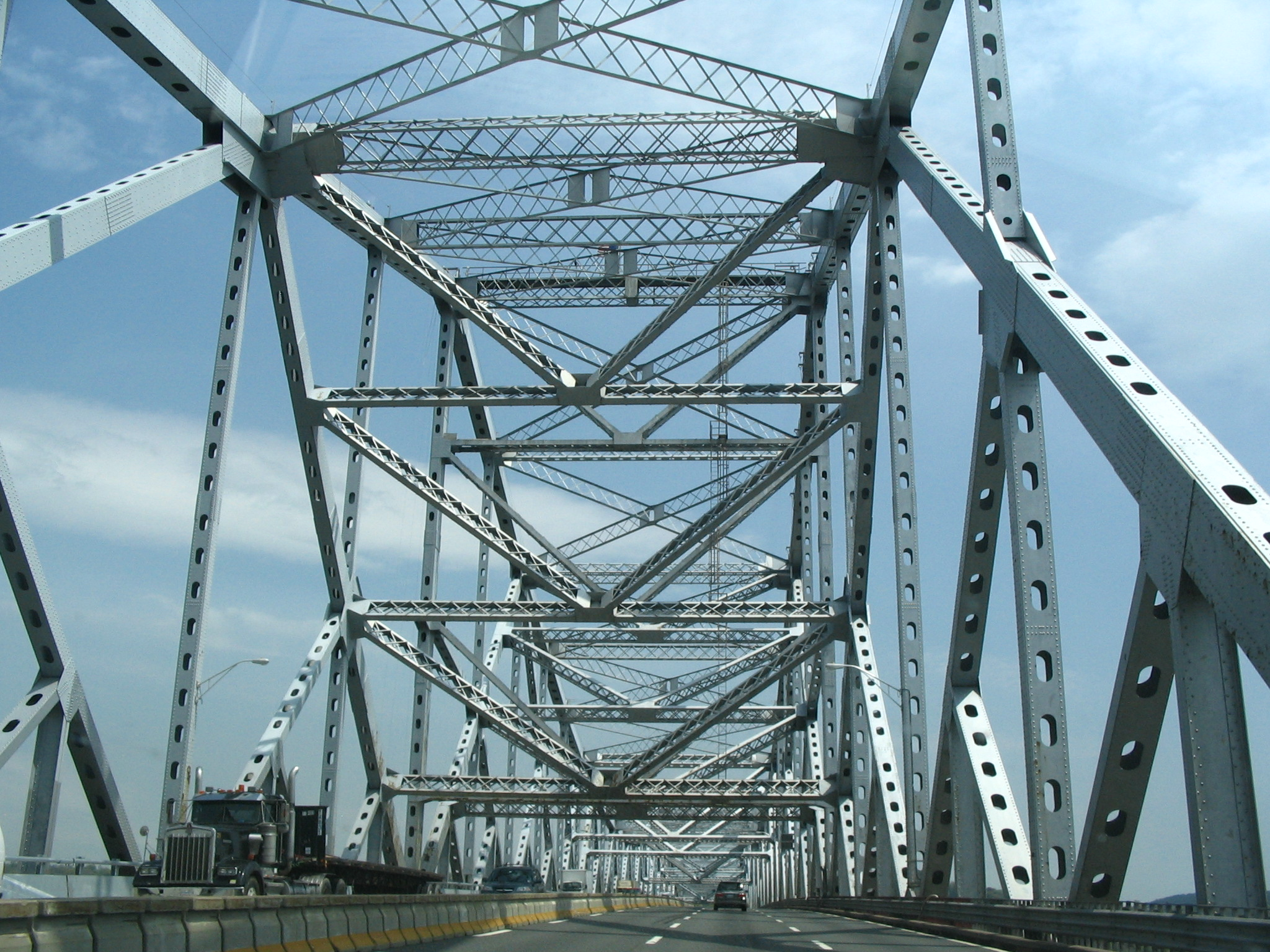
Original Tappan Zee Bridge

The original Tappan Zee Bridge, carrying the concurrency of the New York State Thruway, I-87, and I-287, was a cantilever bridge built during 1952–55. The bridge was three miles (4.8 km) long and spanned the Hudson at its second-widest point. Before its replacement in 2017, the deteriorating structure carried an average of 138,000 vehicles per day, substantially more traffic than its design capacity. During its first decade, the bridge carried fewer than 40,000 vehicles per day. Part of the justification for replacing the bridge stems from its construction immediately following the Korean War on a low budget of only $81 million. Unlike other major bridges in metropolitan New York, the Tappan Zee was designed only to last 50 years. The Federal Highway Administration issued a report in October 2011 designating the Tappan Zee's replacement to be a dual-span twin bridge. Construction officially began in October 2013, with the new spans being built to the north of the existing bridge. The new bridge connects to the existing highway approaches of I-87 and I-287 on both river banks. The northbound/westbound span opened on August 25, 2017. Southbound/eastbound traffic remained on the old bridge until October 6, 2017. At that point, southbound/eastbound traffic shifted to the westbound span of the new bridge and the old bridge closed. The bridge's eastbound span opened to traffic on September 11, 2018. Upon completion, the new Tappan Zee Bridge became one of the longest cable-stayed spans in the nation.

In late 2018, ramp meters were installed on all entrance ramps to the Thruway mainline in Westchester County (exits 1-9) and at all entrances to the entire Cross Westchester Expressway. Ramp meters were activated at exits 11, 12, and 13 in October 2020.

As part of the replacement of the Tappan Zee Bridge, the southbound toll plaza at the east end of the bridge in Westchester County was closed on April 23, 2016 and replaced with an all-electronic toll gantry on the Rockland County side of the bridge. By late 2018, all remaining flat-rate toll barriers on the Thruway were demolished and replaced with electronic toll gantries. As the Harriman interchange was positioned at the southern end of the longer ticket system, a temporary two lane toll plaza was constructed to serve southbound exiting traffic until the ticket systems were converted to open road tolling. In October 2020, it was announced that the transition to cashless tolls would go into effect the following month, which would eliminate all toll booths and their operators. On November 13, 2020, open road tolling was implemented on both of the ticket systems. The cashless tolling project cost $355 million.

== Services ==
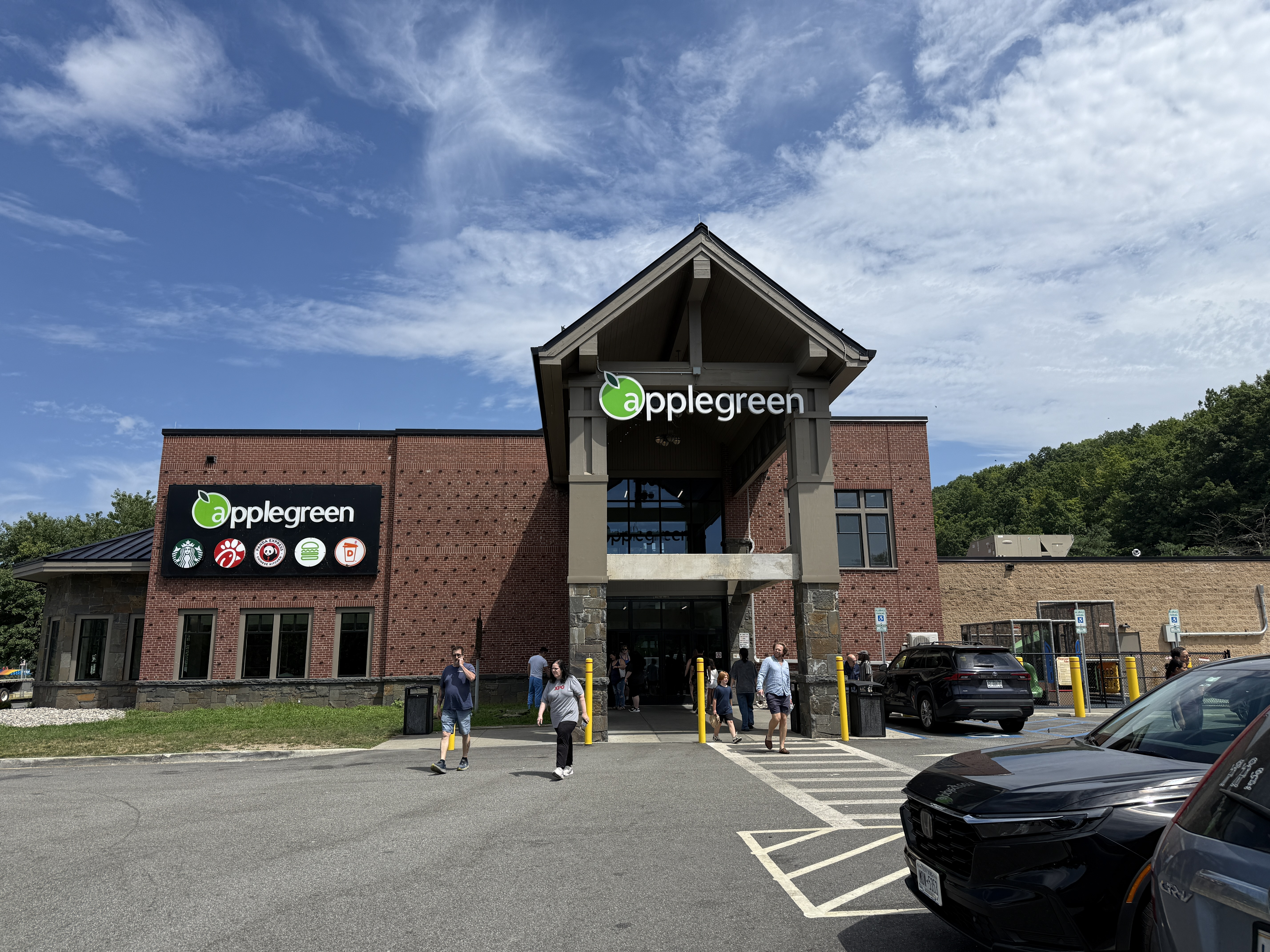
Sloatsburg Service Area

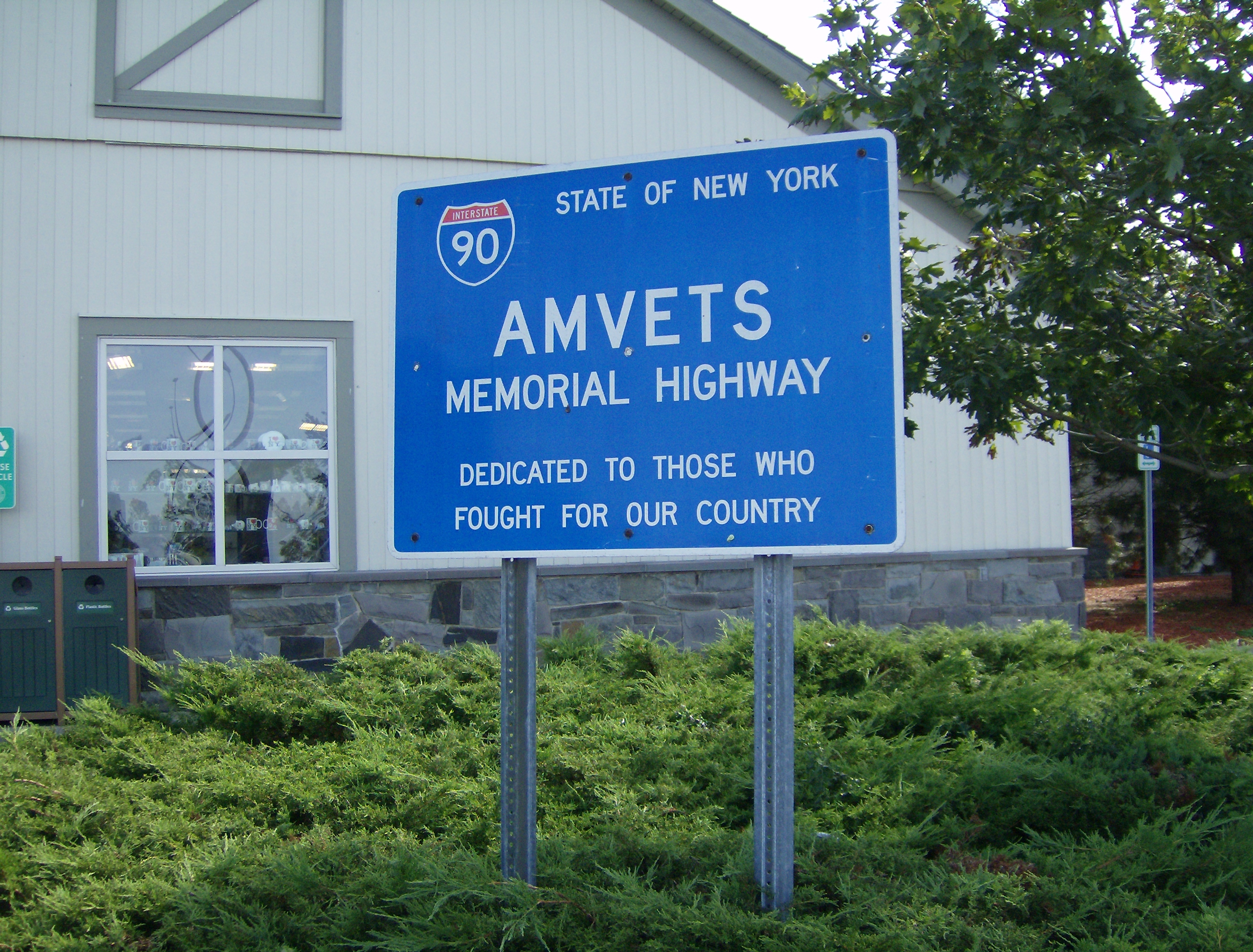
All of I-90 within New York is designated as the "AMVETS Memorial Highway", as indicated by this sign at the Port Byron service area.

There are 27 service areas along the Thruway, all on the New York–Ripley mainline. The service areas, called "travel plazas" by the New York State Thruway Authority (NYSTA), are spaced roughly 30 miles (48 km) apart and are open at all hours of the day. Two plazas—the New Baltimore plaza at milepost 127 and the Angola plaza at milepost 447—are accessible from both directions of the Thruway; the remainder are accessible from only one direction (although the Sloatsburg and Ramapo service plazas at milepost 33 were connected via a pedestrian bridge until 2021). Each plaza features a gas station and a variety of restaurants, at least one of which is open 24 hours. Free Wi-Fi service was added to all 27 service areas on March 1, 2007.

NYSTA also operates the Thruway Authority Highway Advisory Radio (HAR) system, a network of radio stations across the state that broadcast information on traffic conditions along the Thruway. The system broadcasts at 1610 AM in the Rochester, Albany, Kingston, and Newburgh areas, 1620 AM in the Finger Lakes and Syracuse areas, 1630 AM near Buffalo, and 530 AM in the New York City metropolitan area. HAR is also used to broadcast Amber/Silver Alerts if one is issued.

As of August 9, 2023, a check of the FCC's Universal Licensing System (ULS) shows that all of the Highway Advisory Radio stations licensed to the New York State Thruway Authority show a status of "Expired" or "Cancelled".

The New York Thruway Travel Plazas started a redesign and redevelopment program in the middle of 2021. This project is expected to be completed in two phases with one completed in 2023 and the other in 2025. The operators of the rest stops are Empire State Thruway Partners. They plan to include several restaurant options.

=== Travel plazas ===
Name	Location	Direction	mi	km	Restaurants	Services	Fuel
Ardsley	Hastings-on-Hudson	Northbound	6.0	9.7	Applegreen C-Store, Chick-fil-A, Burger King, Starbucks (drive-thru)	E-ZPass On-the-go	High-speed EV charging station, Sunoco
Sloatsburg	Sloatsburg	Northbound	33.0	53.1	Applegreen C-Store, Dunkin' Donuts, Chick-fil-A, Starbucks, Shake Shack, Panda Express	E-ZPass On-the-go	Sunoco
Ramapo	Sloatsburg	Southbound	33.0	53.1	Applegreen C-Store, Panda Express, Panera Bread, Shake Shack, Starbucks (drive-thru)	E-ZPass On-the-go	Sunoco
Plattekill	Walkill	Northbound	65.0	104.6	Applegreen C-Store, Chick-fil-A, Burger King, Starbucks (drive-thru), Panera Bread, Auntie Anne's	E-ZPass On-the-go, Farm Market (seasonal)	High-speed EV charging station, Sunoco
Modena	Walkill	Southbound	66.0	106.2	Applegreen C-Store, Auntie Anne's, Burger King, Dunkin' (drive-thru), Popeyes, Pret A Manger	E-ZPass On-the-go, Farm Market (seasonal)	High-speed EV charging station, Sunoco
Ulster	Ruby	Southbound	96.0	154.5	Applegreen C-Store, Burger King, Starbucks (drive-thru), Panda Express	E-ZPass On-the-Go, farm market (seasonal)	High-speed EV charging station, Sunoco
Malden	Saugerties	Northbound	103.0	165.8	Applegreen C-Store, Popeyes, Dunkin' Donuts (drive-thru), Burger King	E-ZPass On-the-go, Farm Market (seasonal)	High-speed EV charging station, Mobil
New Baltimore	New Baltimore	Both	127.0	204.4	Applegreen C-Store, Starbucks, Chick-fil-A, Panera Bread, Shake Shack	E-ZPass On-the-Go, farm market (seasonal)	High-speed EV charging station, Mobil
Guilderland	Albany/Schenectady	Eastbound	153.0	246.2	Applegreen C-Store, Burger King, Starbucks (drive-thru)	E-ZPass On-the-Go, farm market (seasonal)	Mobil
Pattersonville	Amsterdam	Westbound	168.0	270.4	Applegreen C-Store, Chick-fil-A, Starbucks (drive-thru), Panera Bread	E-ZPass On-the-Go, farm market (seasonal)	Mobil
Mohawk	Amsterdam	Eastbound	172.0	276.8	Applegreen C-Store, Dunkin' Donuts (drive-thru), Burger King		Mobil
Iroquois	Little Falls	Westbound	210.0	338.0	Applegreen C-Store, Burger King, Chick-fil-A, Starbucks (drive-thru)	E-ZPass On-the-go, Farm Market (seasonal)	High-speed EV charging station, Mobil
Indian Castle	Little Falls	Eastbound	210.0	338.0	Applegreen C-Store, Popeyes, Starbucks (drive-thru)	Outdoor Seating, Farm Market (seasonal), Food Truck Space (seasonal), dog walking space	High-speed EV charging station, Mobil
Schuyler	Schuyler	Westbound	227.0	365.3	Applegreen C-Store, Dunkin' (drive-thru)	E-ZPass On-the-Go	High-speed EV charging station, Mobil
Oneida	Westmoreland	Eastbound	244.0	392.7	Applegreen C-Store, Burger King, Panera Bread, Starbucks (drive-thru)	E-ZPass On-the-go, Farm Market (seasonal)	High-speed EV charging station, Sunoco
Chittenango	Canastota	Westbound	266.0	428.1	Applegreen C-Store, Chick-fil-A, Starbucks (drive-thru)	E-ZPass On-the-go	High-speed EV charging station, Sunoco
DeWitt	Syracuse	Eastbound	280.0	450.6	Applegreen C-Store, Starbucks (drive-thru)	E-ZPass On-the-go	Sunoco
Warners	Warners	Westbound	292.0	469.9	Applegreen C-Store, Chick-fil-A, Burger King, Starbucks (drive-thru)	E-ZPass On-the-go, Farm Market (seasonal)	High-speed EV charging station, Mobil
Port Byron	Port Byron	Eastbound	310.0	498.9	Applegreen C-Store, Burger King, Dunkin' Donuts (drive-thru)	E-ZPass On-the-go, Farm Market (seasonal)	Mobil
Junius Ponds	Waterloo	Westbound	324.0	521.4	Applegreen C-Store, Shake Shack, Starbucks, Taste NY Store	E-ZPass On-the-go, Farm Market (seasonal), pet relief area	High-speed EV charging station, Sunoco
Clifton Springs	Clifton Springs	Eastbound	337.0	542.3	Applegreen C-Store, Auntie Anne's, Chick-fil-A, Shake Shack, Starbucks, Taste NY Store	E-ZPass On-the-go, Farm Market (seasonal)	High-speed EV charging station, Sunoco
Seneca	Victor	Westbound	350.0	563.3	Applegreen C-Store, Popeyes, Dunkin' (drive-thru)	E-ZPass On-the-go, Farm Market (seasonal)	High-speed EV charging station, Mobil
Scottsville	Henrietta	Eastbound	366.0	589.0	Applegreen C-Store, Burger King, Dunkin' Donuts (drive-thru)	E-ZPass On-the-go, Farm Market (seasonal)	Mobil
Ontario	Le Roy	Westbound	376.0	605.1	Applegreen C-Store, Starbucks (drive-thru), Burger King	E-ZPass On-the-go, Farm Market (seasonal)	High-speed EV charging station, Sunoco
Pembroke	Pembroke	Eastbound	397.0	638.9	Applegreen C-Store, Popeyes, Burger King, Dunkin' Donuts (drive-thru), Panera Bread	E-ZPass On-the-go, Farm Market (seasonal)	High-speed EV charging station, Sunoco
Clarence	Clarence	Westbound	412.0	663.0	Applegreen C-Store, Popeyes, Burger King, Dunkin' Donuts (drive-thru)	E-ZPass On-the-go, Farm Market (seasonal)	High-speed EV charging station, Sunoco
Angola	Evans	Both	447.0	719.4	Applegreen C-Store, Chick-fil-A, Starbucks (drive-thru), Shake Shack, Panda Express, Auntie Anne's, Cinnabon	E-ZPass On-the-go	High-speed EV charging station, Sunoco

== Tolls ==
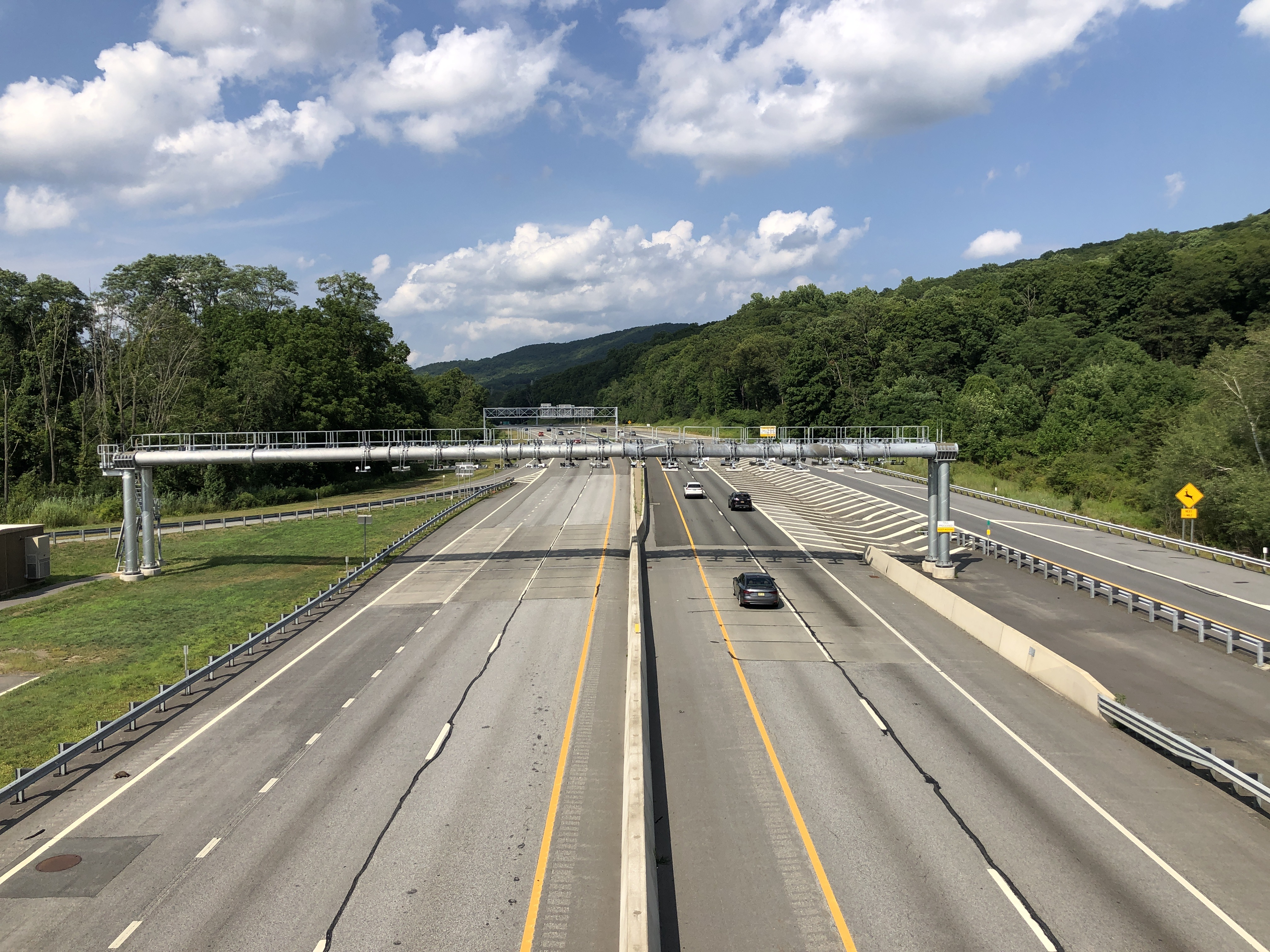
Woodbury Toll Gantry along the mainline

All components of the New York State Thruway system except for the Garden State Parkway Connector and the Cross Westchester Expressway are tolled in some capacity. The entire Thruway has used an all-electronic, open road tolling system since November 14, 2020, with tolls being collected by E-ZPass or Tolls by Mail. Seventy electronic toll gantries comprise the Thruway toll system.

As of 2021, drivers with out-of-state issued E-ZPass transponders pay 15% more than drivers with transponders issued by the New York Customer Service Center. Tolls by Mail rates are 30% higher than New York E-ZPass rates. Tolls by Mail drivers pay an additional fee when receiving their invoice.

=== Component toll sections ===
There are three types of toll sections on the Thruway: closed-toll segments, flat-rate highway gantry segments, and flat-rate bridge/barrier gantry segments. On the closed-toll segments, a driver is electronically recorded when they enter and pay a distance-based toll upon exit. The highway gantry segments are situated between closed-toll segments and are spaced so they require a toll to travel between any pair of exits on each segment. Finally, the barrier/bridge gantries generally contain free exits on either side of the gantry.

==== Closed-toll segments and highway gantries ====
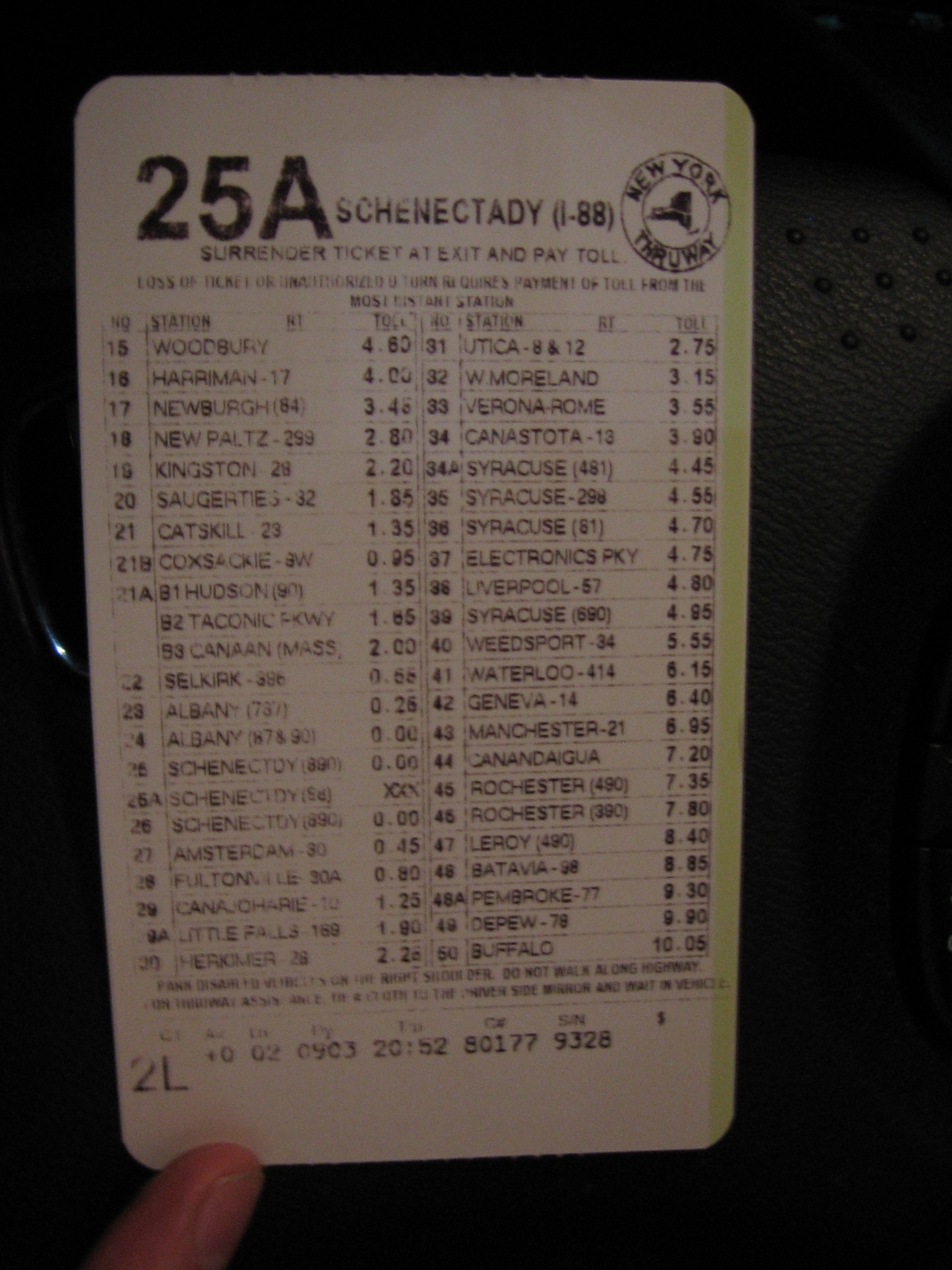
A former New York State Thruway toll ticket obtained at exit 25A

Prior to the implementation of electronic tolling, the longer of the two closed-toll systems began at exit 16 in Woodbury and extended from NY 17 to just east of exit 50 in Williamsville. The Berkshire Connector was enclosed within this system, so traveling between the mainline and the connector via exit 21A did not involve crossing an electronic toll gantry. Under the old ticket system, the connector's exits up to the toll barrier at exit B3 were listed with the mainline exits on tickets for the major closed system. The other system encompassed the portion of the mainline between exit 55 in Lackawanna and exit 61 near the Pennsylvania state line.

Similar to the old system, any travel between exits 15A and 50 and between exits 55 and 61 requires paying a toll, but a mixture of closed-toll segments and fixed-toll gantries are used. There are six closed-toll segments on the Thruway, which are numbered 1 through 6. Within each closed-toll segment, there are highway gantries on the mainline Thruway before the respective start and end of each segment, as well as on the entrance and exit ramps of all interchanges between each of these highway gantries. Cameras or E-ZPass readers record vehicles entering each segment, and a distance-based toll is calculated when vehicles leave that segment. Segments 1 through 5 cover the exits in the old closed-toll system from Woodbury to Williamsville, while segment 6 comprises the shorter system from Lackawanna to Ripley. The segments are as follows:

- Segment 1: exits 50 to 47
- Segment 2: exits 44 to 39
- Segment 3: exits 39 to 36
- Segment 4: exits 34A to 25A
- Segment 5: exits 23 to 15A and the Berkshire Connector (tolls from southbound drivers entering at exit 16 and northbound drivers leaving at exit 16 are flat-rate; see New York State Thruway § Barrier/bridge gantries)
- Segment 6: exits 61 to 55

The eight fixed-rate segment highway gantries are all located between the closed-toll (distance-based) segments. Unlike at the closed-toll segments, a single fixed-rate toll is paid when traveling between adjacent exits, but motorists driving for longer distances pay multiple tolls. These eight toll points on the highway took the place of toll plazas at the adjacent exits, therefore these exits do not need or have their own toll gantries. There was no corresponding old toll point (barrier plaza) on the highway before November 2020, where this class of gantry now stands, since the plazas were at the exits. Also, when the plazas were at the exits, rather than being fixed-rate, there was a distance-based toll, using tickets or being electronically recorded using E-ZPass. The locations on the highway of this class of toll gantry are as follows:

- Three gantries between exits 47 and 44
- Two gantries between exits 36 and 34A
- Three gantries between exits 25A and 23

==== Standalone fixed toll gantries ====
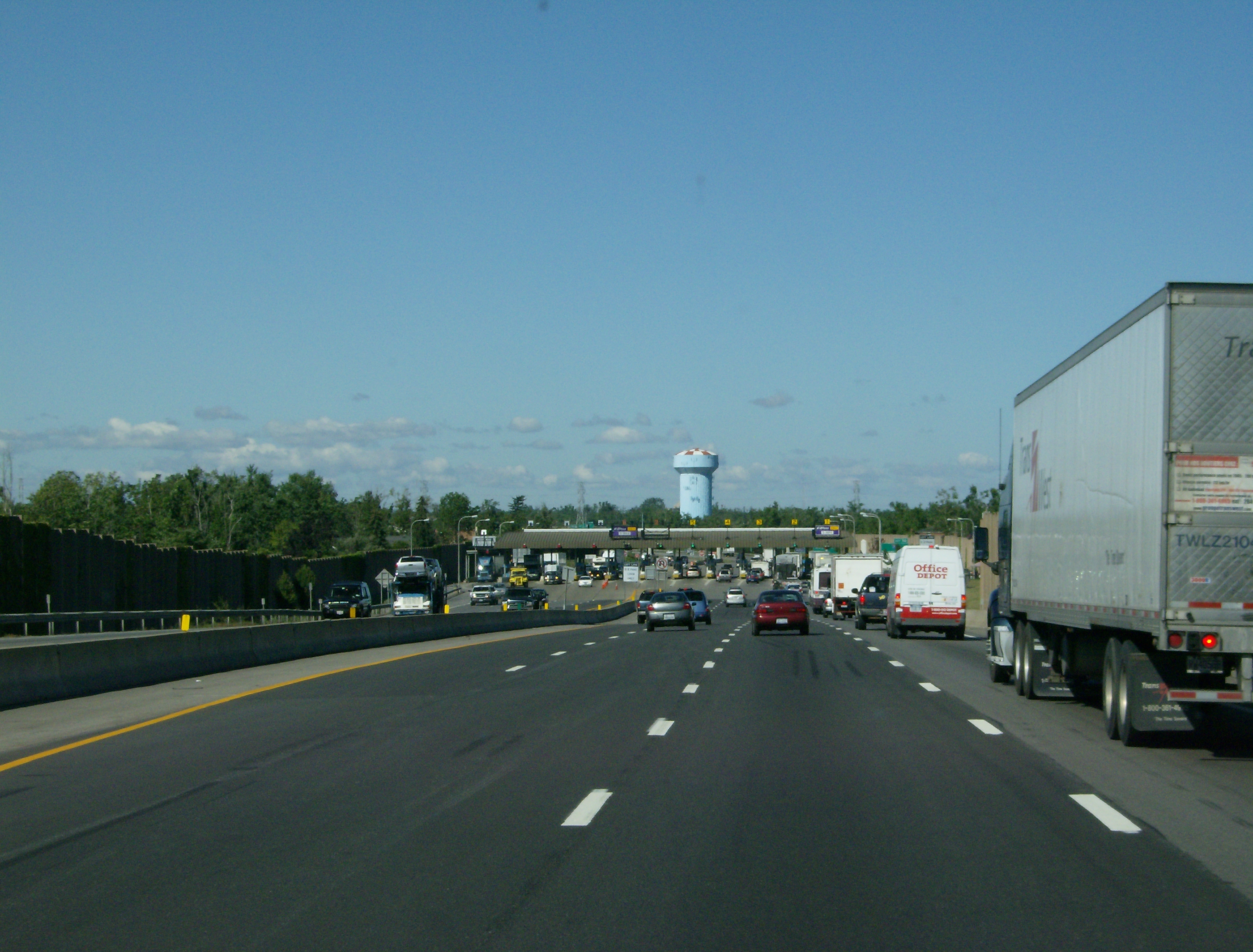
Approaching the Williamsville toll barrier on I-90 / Thruway westbound. This toll plaza was demolished following the conversion of the Thruway to electronic tolling and was replaced with an overhead gantry.

This class of toll gantry on the Thruway system replaced former fixed-rate toll barrier plazas located at bridges and other locations. These particular toll points are their own class because they are not considered segments of the distance-based toll system (former ticket systems), unlike fixed-rate segment highway gantries which are situated between distance-based toll segments. These toll points were made cashless (changed from plazas to gantries) first, from 2016 to 2018, contrasted with fixed-rate segment highway gantries, which were established for tolling in November 2020, when cashless tolling went live on the ticket systems of the Thruway. Even before cashless tolling, which brought more segmentation and the other class of fixed-rate toll point, these toll points were considered standalone due to being outside the ticket systems. This class of toll gantry, and the toll barriers that existed before, are subject to conditions such as direction of travel and not being covered by the E-ZPass annual permit plan.

On the mainline Thruway, there are three flat-rate bridge/barrier gantries. The southernmost of these is in Yonkers, where there is a bi-directional gantry between exits 6A and 7. In South Nyack, there is a southbound-only toll gantry for the Tappan Zee Bridge. Lastly, there is a northbound, commercial traffic-only gantry between exits 14A and 14B near Spring Valley.

The Harriman toll gantry at exit 16 is also a barrier/bridge gantry; it is right next to the Woodbury toll gantry, which forms the southern end of closed-tolling segment 5. The Harriman toll gantry is used by traffic entering the southbound Thruway from future I-86, as well as traffic on the northbound Thruway exiting to future I-86. Traffic entering or continuing on the northbound Thruway, as well as traffic from the southbound Thruway that is exiting or continuing south, use the Woodbury toll gantry. The ticket on the former ticketed system was identical to that given for exit 15A with the exception that the toll for exit 16 is subtracted from all of the prices. To distinguish between exit 16 and the Woodbury toll barrier, Thruway tickets listed the NY 17 interchange as exit 16 and the Woodbury toll plaza as exit 15, although the actual exit 15 is situated almost 15 miles (24 km) to the south.

The other components of the system that are tolled have far fewer tolls. On the New England Thruway (I-95), there is a fixed-rate electronic toll gantry on I-95 northbound between exits 16 and 17 in New Rochelle. Meanwhile, the only tolls along the Niagara Thruway (I-190) are those for the North and South Grand Island Bridges.

=== Cost ===
When the Thruway opened in the mid-1950s, the cost to travel from Buffalo to New York City was $5.60 (equivalent to $53.00 in 2025). The closed ticket system, which at the time extended from Spring Valley to Williamsville, accounted for $5 of the toll, while the remaining $0.60 was charged at the Yonkers ($0.10) and Tappan Zee ($0.50) toll barriers. After the south end of the major closed ticket system was moved from Spring Valley to Woodbury, the Spring Valley toll barrier became a fixed-rate toll for both cars and trucks. As of January 2026, the trip from Buffalo to the New York City line for a two-axle passenger vehicle costs $46.89 with toll-by-plate or an out-of-state E-ZPass, and $26.79 with a New York-issued E-ZPass, calculated at 15 gantries and tolling sections. The return trip costs $34.20 with toll-by-plate or an out-of-state E-ZPass and $19.54 with a New York-issued E-ZPass across 14 gantries and tolling sections, as the Tappan Zee Bridge gantry only charges a southbound/eastbound toll.

As of January 2026, the Berkshire Connector costs $1.45 ($0.83 with New York E-ZPass) to travel between the Massachusetts state line and exit B1. Tolls west of exit B1 vary based on which direction a motorist travels on I-87. The toll on the minor closed ticket system from Pennsylvania to exit 55 south of Buffalo is $5.46 with toll-by-plate or an out-of-state E-ZPass and $3.12 with a New York-issued E-ZPass. The Grand Island Bridges on I-190 cost $1.75 to cross ($1.00 with New York E-ZPass) while the New Rochelle toll gantry on I-95 costs $3.05 ($1.74 with New York E-ZPass). The Black Rock and City Line toll barriers on the Niagara Thruway in Buffalo charged $0.75 at the time of their removal on October 30, 2006.

All tolls along the Thruway were supposed to be abolished when the construction bonds used to build it had been paid off. The last of the bonds was paid off in 1996; however, the tolls remained in place after the New York State Legislature transferred ownership of the New York State Canal System to NYSTA in 1992.

== Exit list ==
For exits on the Cross Westchester Expressway, the New England Thruway, or the Niagara Thruway, see the articles on those highways.

Unlike many interstate highways, exits are identified by a number in ascending sequence, rather than by their mileage (distance) markers, starting with exit 1 on the east, just outside New York City, and ending with exit 61 on the west, near the Pennsylvania state line.

=== Mainline ===
County	Location	mi	km	Exit	Destinations	Notes
Bronx–Westchester county line	Van Cortlandt Park–Yonkers line	0.00	0.00	–	I-87 south (Major Deegan Expressway) – New York City	Continuation south; southern end of I-87 concurrency
Westchester	Yonkers	0.48	0.77	1	Hall Place / McLean Avenue	No northbound access to McLean Avenue
Westchester	Yonkers	0.92	1.48	2	Yonkers Avenue – Raceway	Northbound exit and southbound entrance
Westchester	Yonkers	1.77	2.85	3	Mile Square Road	Northbound exit and southbound entrance
Westchester	Yonkers	2.18	3.51	4	Cross County Parkway to Mile Square Road	Cloverleaf interchange with Central Park Avenue; no southbound entrance; no northbound access to Mile Square Road
Westchester	Yonkers	2.70	4.35	5	NY 100 north (Central Park Avenue) – White Plains	Northbound exit and southbound entrance; southern terminus of NY 100
Westchester	Yonkers	4.00	6.44	6	Tuckahoe Road – Bronxville, Tuckahoe, Yonkers	Signed as exits 6E (east) and 6W (west) southbound
Westchester	Yonkers	5.14	8.27	6A	Ridge Hill Boulevard / Stew Leonard Drive	Last northbound exit before toll
Westchester	Yonkers	5.80	9.33	Yonkers Toll Gantry (E-ZPass or Toll by Mail)		
Westchester	Greenburgh	6.10	9.82	Ardsley Service Area (northbound)		
Westchester	Ardsley	7.58	12.20	7	NY 9A – Ardsley	Northbound exit and southbound entrance
Westchester	Greenburgh	10.33	16.62	7A	Saw Mill River Parkway to Taconic State Parkway north	Same-directional access only; no southbound entrance; exit 20 on Saw Mill Parkway; last southbound exit before toll
Westchester	Greenburgh	11.31– 11.80	18.20– 18.99	8	I-287 east / NY 119 / Saw Mill River Parkway north – White Plains, Rye	Signed as exits 8A (NY 119/Saw Mill) and 8 (I-287) southbound; southern end of I-287 concurrency; exit 22 on Saw Mill Parkway
Westchester	Tarrytown	12.65	20.36	9	To US 9 – Tarrytown, Sleepy Hollow	Northbound exit and entrance; access via NY 119
Westchester	Tarrytown	12.65	20.36	9	US 9 / NY 119 east – Tarrytown, Sleepy Hollow	Southbound exit and entrance; NY 119 not signed
Hudson River		12.80– 14.50	20.60– 23.34	Tappan Zee (Governor Mario M. Cuomo) Bridge (southbound toll; E-ZPass or Toll by Mail)		
Rockland	South Nyack	16.75	26.96	10	US 9W – Nyack, South Nyack	No southbound exit
Rockland	Nyack	17.63	28.37	11	US 9W / NY 59 west – Nyack	Northbound exit and entrance; access via High Avenue; NY 59 not signed
Rockland	Nyack	17.63	28.37	11	To US 9W – Nyack, South Nyack	Southbound exit and entrance; access via NY 59; last southbound exit before toll
Rockland	West Nyack	18.76	30.19	12	NY 303 / Palisades Center Drive – West Nyack	Palisades Center Drive not signed northbound
Rockland	West Nyack	20.94	33.70	13	Palisades Parkway – Bear Mountain, New Jersey	Signed as exits 13N (north) and exit 13S (south); exits 9E-W on Palisades Parkway
Rockland	Nanuet	22.80	36.69	14	NY 59 (CR 35A) – Spring Valley, Nanuet	
Rockland	Nanuet	23.00	37.01	–	CR 35 (Pascack Road) / Old Turnpike Road	Southbound entrance only
Rockland	Chestnut Ridge	23.53	37.87	14A	To G.S. Parkway south – New Jersey	Access via G.S. Parkway Connector
Rockland	Chestnut Ridge	24.30	39.11	Spring Valley Toll Gantry (E-ZPass or Toll by Mail; northbound trucks)		
Rockland	Montebello	27.62	44.45	14B	Airmont Road (CR 89) – Airmont, Montebello	Access to Good Samaritan Regional Medical Center
Rockland	Suffern	30.17	48.55	15	I-287 south / Route 17 south – New Jersey NY 17 begins	Northern end of I-287 concurrency; southern terminus of NY 17; northern terminus of Route 17
Rockland	Hillburn	31.35	50.45	15A	NY 17 north / NY 59 east – Sloatsburg, Suffern	Northern end of NY 17 concurrency; western terminus of NY 59; last northbound exit before toll
Rockland	Sloatsburg	33.20	53.43	Sloatsburg-Ramapo Service Area		
Orange	Woodbury	45.20	72.74	16	Future I-86 west to US 6 / NY 17 – Harriman	Harriman Toll Gantry (E-ZPass or Toll by Mail)
Orange	Woodbury	45.20	72.74	Woodbury Toll Gantry (E-ZPass or Toll by Mail)		
Orange	Town of Newburgh	60.10	96.72	17	I-84 / NY 300 to NY 17K – Scranton, Newburgh	Exit 36A on I-84
Orange	Town of Newburgh	64.8– 65.9	104.3– 106.1	Plattekill-Modena Service Area		
Ulster	Town of New Paltz	76.01	122.33	18	NY 299 – Mid-Hudson Bridge, New Paltz, Poughkeepsie	
Ulster	Ulster	91.37	147.05	19	NY 28 (I-587 east) – Kingston, Rhinecliff Bridge	
Ulster	Ulster	96.30	154.98	Ulster Service Area (southbound)		
Ulster	Town of Saugerties	101.25	162.95	20	NY 32 / NY 212 – Saugerties, Woodstock	Woodstock not signed northbound; NY 212 not signed
Ulster	Town of Saugerties	103.20	166.08	Malden Service Area (northbound)		
Greene	Town of Catskill	113.89	183.29	21	To NY 23 – Catskill, Cairo	Access via CR 23B
Greene	New Baltimore	124.53	200.41	21B	US 9W to NY 81 – Coxsackie, Ravena	
Greene	New Baltimore	127.30	204.87	New Baltimore Service Area / Capital Region Welcome Center		
Albany	Coeymans	133.60	215.01	21A	To I-90 / Mass Pike east – Boston	Access via Berkshire Connector
Albany	Bethlehem	134.93	217.15	22	NY 144 to NY 396 – Selkirk	
Albany	Bethlehem	139.80	224.99	Toll Gantry (E-ZPass or Toll by Mail)		
Albany	Albany	141.92	228.40	23	I-787 north / US 9W – Albany, Troy	Southern terminus of I-787; access to MVP Arena and Albany–Rensselaer station
Albany	Bethlehem	145.60	234.32	Toll Gantry (E-ZPass or Toll by Mail)		
Albany	Albany–Guilderland line	148.15	238.42	24	I-87 north / I-90 east – Albany, Montreal	Northern end of I-87 concurrency; eastern end of I-90 concurrency
Albany	Albany–Guilderland line	149.60	240.76	Toll Gantry (E-ZPass or Toll by Mail)		
Albany	Guilderland	152.80	245.91	Guilderland Service Area (eastbound)		
Albany	Guilderland	153.83	247.57	25	I-890 west / NY 7 to NY 146 – Schenectady	Eastern terminus of I-890
Schenectady	Rotterdam	157.80	253.95	Toll Gantry (E-ZPass or Toll by Mail)		
Schenectady	Rotterdam	158.82	255.60	25A	I-88 west to NY 7 – Schenectady, Binghamton	Eastern terminus of I-88
Schenectady	Rotterdam	161.00	259.10	Toll Gantry (E-ZPass or Toll by Mail)		
Schenectady	Rotterdam	162.22	261.07	26	I-890 east / NY 5S west to NY 5 – Schenectady, Scotia	Western terminus and exit 1B on I-890; access to NY 5 via NY 890
Montgomery	Florida	168.20	270.69	Pattersonville Service Area (westbound)		
Montgomery	Florida	171.80	276.49	Mohawk Service Area (eastbound)		
Montgomery	Florida–Amsterdam line	173.59	279.37	27	NY 30 – Amsterdam	
Montgomery	Fultonville	182.17	293.17	28	NY 30A – Fultonville, Fonda	Access to Fulton County Airport
Montgomery	Root	186.90	300.79	Fultonville Rest Area / Mohawk Valley Welcome Center (westbound)		
Montgomery	Town of Canajoharie	194.10	312.37	29	To NY 10 – Canajoharie, Sharon Springs	Access via NY 5S
Herkimer	Danube	209.90	337.80	Indian Castle-Iroquois Service Area		
Herkimer	Danube	210.62	338.96	29A	To NY 169 – Little Falls, Dolgeville	
Herkimer	Village of Herkimer	219.70	353.57	30	NY 28 – Herkimer, Mohawk	
Herkimer	Schuyler	227.00	365.32	Schuyler Service Area (westbound)		
Oneida	Utica	232.85	374.74	31	I-790 west / NY 8 / NY 12 – Utica, Rome	Rome not signed eastbound; eastern terminus of I-790
Oneida	Westmoreland	243.37	391.67	32	NY 233 – Westmoreland, Rome	Access via Cider Street; Rome not signed eastbound
Oneida	Westmoreland	244.00	392.68	Oneida Service Area (eastbound)		
Oneida	Verona	252.71	406.70	33	NY 365 – Verona, Oneida, Rome	Signed for Oneida westbound, Rome eastbound
Madison	Canastota	261.50	420.84	34	NY 13 – Canastota, Chittenango, Oneida	Signed for Chittenango westbound, Oneida eastbound
Madison	Sullivan	266.20	428.41	Chittenango Service Area (westbound)		
Onondaga	Town of Manlius	276.10	444.34	Toll Gantry (E-ZPass or Toll by Mail)		
Onondaga	DeWitt	276.58	445.11	34A	I-81 to I-690 – Syracuse, Oswego, Chittenango	Exit 90 on I-81; signed for Oswego westbound, Chittenango eastbound
Onondaga	DeWitt	277.50	446.59	Toll Gantry (E-ZPass or Toll by Mail)		
Onondaga	DeWitt	278.93	448.89	35	NY 298 / NY 635 – Syracuse, East Syracuse	
Onondaga	DeWitt	279.40	449.65	DeWitt Service Area (eastbound)		
Onondaga	Salina	281.30	452.71	Toll Gantry (E-ZPass or Toll by Mail)		
Onondaga	Salina	282.93	455.33	36	I-81 – Watertown, Binghamton, Syracuse Airport	Exit 7 on I-81
Onondaga	Salina	283.40	456.09	Toll Gantry (E-ZPass or Toll by Mail)		
Onondaga	Salina	283.79	456.72	37	Electronics Parkway – Liverpool, Syracuse	Signed for Liverpool westbound, Syracuse eastbound
Onondaga	Salina	285.95	460.19	38	CR 57 – Liverpool, Syracuse	
Onondaga	Van Buren	288.80	464.78	Toll Gantry (E-ZPass or Toll by Mail)		
Onondaga	Van Buren	289.53	465.95	39	I-690 east / NY 690 north – Syracuse, Fulton	Western terminus and exit 1A on I-690; southern terminus of NY 690
Onondaga	Van Buren	291.30	468.80	Warners Service Area (westbound)		
Onondaga	Van Buren	294.60	474.11	Toll Gantry (E-ZPass or Toll by Mail)		
Cayuga	Brutus	304.19	489.55	40	NY 34 – Weedsport, Auburn	
Cayuga	Mentz	308.30	496.16	Erie Canal Heritage Park (eastbound)		
Cayuga	Montezuma	310.10	499.06	Port Byron Service Area (eastbound)		
Seneca	Tyre	320.41	515.65	41	NY 414 – Waterloo, Clyde	
Seneca	Junius	323.60	520.78	Junius Ponds Service Area (westbound)		
Ontario	Town of Phelps	327.10	526.42	42	NY 14 / NY 318 east – Geneva, Lyons	Western terminus of NY 318
Ontario	Town of Manchester	336.90	542.19	Clifton Springs Service Area (eastbound)		
Ontario	Town of Manchester	340.15	547.42	43	NY 21 to NY 96 – Manchester, Palmyra	
Ontario	Town of Manchester	340.70	548.30	Toll Gantry (E-ZPass or Toll by Mail)		
Ontario	Farmington	347.13	558.65	44	NY 332 south – Canandaigua, Victor	Victor not signed eastbound; northern terminus of NY 332
Ontario	Town of Victor	348.00	560.05	Toll Gantry (E-ZPass or Toll by Mail)		
Ontario	Town of Victor	349.20	561.98	Seneca Service Area (westbound)		
Ontario	Town of Victor	350.99	564.86	45	I-490 west / NY 96 – Rochester, Victor	Victor not signed westbound; eastern terminus of I-490
Monroe	Pittsford	358.10	576.31	Toll Gantry (E-ZPass or Toll by Mail)		
Monroe	Henrietta	362.44	583.29	46	I-390 / NY 253 to NY 15 – Rochester, Corning	Exit 12B on I-390
Monroe	Henrietta	365.30	587.89	Scottsville Service Area (eastbound)		
Monroe	Chili	368.80	593.53	Toll Gantry (E-ZPass or Toll by Mail)		
Genesee	Town of Le Roy	375.20	603.83	Ontario Service Area (westbound)		
Genesee	Town of Le Roy	378.56	609.23	47	I-490 east / NY 19 – Le Roy, Rochester	Western terminus of I-490
Genesee	Town of Le Roy	379.10	610.10	Toll Gantry (E-ZPass or Toll by Mail)		
Genesee	Town of Batavia	390.13	627.85	48	NY 98 – Batavia	
Genesee	Pembroke	397.00	638.91	Pembroke Service Area (eastbound)		
Genesee	Pembroke	401.72	646.51	48A	NY 77 – Pembroke, Medina	
Erie	Town of Lancaster	411.60	662.41	Clarence Service Area (westbound)		
Erie	Cheektowaga–Amherst line	417.27	671.53	49	NY 78 – Depew, Lockport, Buffalo Niagara International Airport	
Erie	Cheektowaga–Amherst line	418.15	672.95	Williamsville Toll Gantry (E-ZPass or Toll by Mail)		
Erie	Cheektowaga–Amherst line	420.34	676.47	50	I-290 west – Niagara Falls	Eastern terminus of I-290; interchange formerly served NY 5; last eastbound exit before toll
Erie	Cheektowaga	420.93	677.42	50A	Cleveland Drive	Eastbound exit and westbound entrance
Erie	Cheektowaga	421.57	678.45	51	NY 33 – Buffalo, Buffalo Niagara International Airport	Signed as exits 51W (west) and 51E (east); interchange formerly served Maryvale Drive
Erie	Cheektowaga	423.19	681.06	52	Walden Avenue – Cheektowaga, Buffalo	Signed as exits 52W (west) and 52E (east)
Erie	Cheektowaga	424.92	683.84	52A	William Street	
Erie	Cheektowaga	426.17	685.85	53	I-190 north – Downtown Buffalo, Canada, Niagara Falls	Southern terminus of I-190
Erie	West Seneca	427.94	688.70	54	NY 400 south to NY 16 – West Seneca, East Aurora	Northern terminus of NY 400
Erie	West Seneca	429.47	691.16	55	US 219 south – Orchard Park, Springville	Westbound exit and eastbound entrance; northern terminus of US 219; last westbound exit before toll
Erie	West Seneca			55	Ridge Road – Lackawanna, West Seneca	Eastbound exit and westbound entrance; access via US 219
Erie	Lackawanna	431.15	693.87	Lackawanna Toll Gantry (E-ZPass or Toll by Mail)		
Erie	Town of Hamburg	432.45	695.96	56	NY 179 (Milestrip Road) to US 62 – Blasdell, Orchard Park	Orchard Park not signed westbound
Erie	Town of Hamburg	436.22	702.03	57	NY 75 – Hamburg, East Aurora	
Erie	Evans	444.87	715.95	57A	Eden, Angola	
Erie	Evans	446.60	718.73	Angola Service Area		
Chautauqua	Hanover	455.54	733.12	58	To US 20 / NY 5 – Silver Creek, Irving	Access to Lakeshore Hospital
Chautauqua	Town of Dunkirk	467.74	752.75	59	NY 60 – Dunkirk, Fredonia	
Chautauqua	Town of Westfield	485.00	780.53	60	NY 394 – Westfield, Mayville	
Chautauqua	Town of Westfield	488.50	786.16	Ripley Toll Gantry (E-ZPass or Toll by Mail)		
Chautauqua	Ripley	494.92	796.50	61	Shortman Road (NY 950D) to US 20 / NY 5 / NY 76 – Ripley	Last eastbound exit before toll
Chautauqua	Ripley	496.00	798.23	–	I-90 west – Erie	Continuation into Pennsylvania; western end of I-90 concurrency
1.000 mi = 1.609 km; 1.000 km = 0.621 mi: Concurrency terminus; Electronic toll collection; Incomplete access; Route transition

=== Berkshire Connector ===
The Berkshire Connector is a closed toll system that extends east from the Thruway mainline to the Canaan Toll Barrier, connecting the mainline Thruway to the Mass Pike.

County	Location	mi	km	Exit	Destinations	Notes
Albany	Coeymans	0.00	0.00	–	I-87 Toll (New York Thruway) to I-90 – New York City, Buffalo	Western terminus; exit 21A on I-87 / Thruway; former routing of I-90
Hudson River		0.95	1.53	Castleton Bridge		
Rensselaer	Schodack	6.58	10.59	B1	I-90 west to US 9 – Albany, Hudson	Western end of I-90 concurrency
Columbia	Town of Chatham	15.09	24.29	B2	Taconic State Parkway south to NY 295 – Chatham, East Chatham, Canaan	Accees to NY 295 via Upper Cady Road; northern terminus of Taconic State Parkway
Columbia	Canaan	18.1	29.1	Canaan Toll Gantry (E-ZPass or Toll by Mail)		
Columbia	Canaan	23.27	37.45	B3	NY 22 – Austerlitz, New Lebanon, West Stockbridge, Stockbridge	
Columbia	Canaan	24.28	39.07	–	I-90 Toll east / Mass Pike east – Boston, Springfield	Continuation into Massachusetts; eastern end of I-90 concurrency
1.000 mi = 1.609 km; 1.000 km = 0.621 mi: Electronic toll collection

=== Garden State Parkway Connector ===
The entire route is in Chestnut Ridge, Rockland County. All exits are unnumbered.

mi	km	Destinations	Notes
2.40	3.86	G.S. Parkway south – New Jersey	Continuation into New Jersey
2.09	3.36	Red Schoolhouse Road (CR 41) – Chestnut Ridge	Southbound exit and northbound entrance; signed as School House Road; last southbound exit before toll; all trucks must exit
		I-87 north / I-287 west (New York Thruway) – Albany	Northbound exit and southbound entrance; exit 14A on I-87 / I-287 / Thruway
		Nanuet	Northbound exit only; access via CR 35
0.00	0.00	I-87 south / I-287 east (New York Thruway) – Governor Mario M. Cuomo Bridge, New York City	Northern terminus
1.000 mi = 1.609 km; 1.000 km = 0.621 mi: Incomplete access; Tolled

== See also ==
- New York State Department of Transportation
- Schoharie Creek Bridge collapse – bridge collapse along the Thruway in 1987
