= Earlton, New York =

- Hamlet
- Location within New York Location within the United States
- Coordinates: 42°21′20″N 73°54′02″W
- Country: United States
- State: New York
- County: Greene
- Elevation: 417 ft (127 m)
- Time zone: UTC-5 (Eastern (EST))
  - Summer (DST): UTC-4 (EDT)
- ZIP code: 12058
- Area codes: 518 & 838
- GNIS feature ID: 948956

Earlton is a hamlet in Greene County, New York, United States. The community is located along New York State Route 81, in the western part of the town of Coxsackie. Earlton has a post office with ZIP code 12058, which opened on April 29, 1886.
