= New Baltimore, New York =

- Town
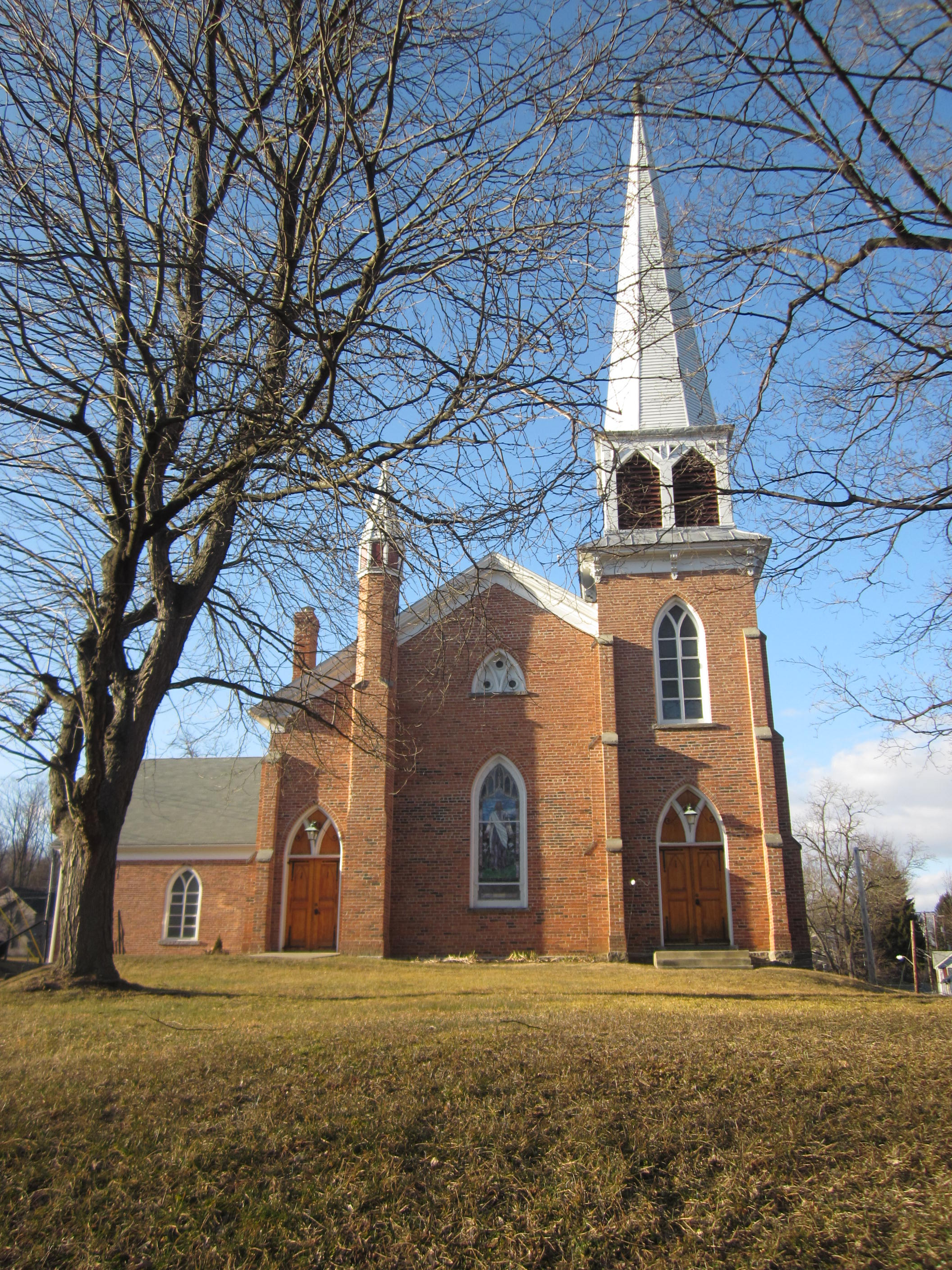
- New Baltimore Reformed Church

- Location in Greene County and the state of New York
- Coordinates: 42°24′54″N 73°50′38″W
- Country: United States
- State: New York
- County: Greene

Government
  - Type: Town Council
  - Town Supervisor: Jeff Ruso (R)
  - Town Council: Members' List: • Shelly Van Etten (R); • Charles Irving (R); • R. Scott Briody (R); • Kelly Downes (R)

Area
  - Total: 43.02 sq mi (111.42 km^{2})
  - Land: 41.42 sq mi (107.28 km^{2})
  - Water: 1.60 sq mi (4.15 km^{2})
- Elevation: 686 ft (209 m)

Population (2020)
  - Total: 3,226
  - Density: 77.88/sq mi (30.07/km^{2})
- Time zone: UTC-5 (Eastern (EST))
  - Summer (DST): UTC-4 (EDT)
- ZIP Codes: 12124 (New Baltimore); 12087 (Hannacroix); 12192 (West Coxsackie); 12042 (Climax); 12046 (Coeymans Hollow); 12051 (Coxsackie); 12058 (Earlton); 12143 (Ravena); 12176 (Surprise)
- Area code: 518
- FIPS code: 36-039-49935
- GNIS feature ID: 0979255
- Website: https://townofnewbaltimore.gov/

New Baltimore is a town in the northeastern part of Greene County, New York, United States. The population was 3,226 at the 2020 United States census, down from 3,370 in the 2010 census.

== History ==
The region was part of the Mahican homeland. The area was settled circa 1700 and was included in early Dutch and English patents. New Baltimore was formed as a town in 1811 from the town of Coxsackie.

In 1900, the town population was 1,536.

=== Street Veiw Anomaly ===
In 2007 a glitched Google Street View capture of New Baltimore led to parts of the town apearing warped and very eerie, this capture would go viral in 2013, with some believeing that what was going on in the image to be real, however this glitch was fixed in 2016 after Street Veiw recaptured the area.

== Geography ==
According to the United States Census Bureau, the town has a total area of 43.1 square miles (112 km^{2}), of which 41.6 square miles (108 km^{2}) is land and 1.5 square miles (3.9 km^{2}), or 3.55%, is water.

The eastern town line is defined by the Hudson River and is the border of Columbia County. The northern town line is the border of Albany County.

The New York State Thruway (Interstate 87) and U.S. Route 9W pass through the town.

== Demographics ==
Historical population
Census	Pop.	Note	%±
1820	2,036		—
1830	2,370		16.4%
1840	2,306		−2.7%
1850	2,381		3.3%
1860	2,512		5.5%
1870	2,617		4.2%
1880	2,620		0.1%
1890	2,455		−6.3%
1900	2,283		−7.0%
1910	1,936		−15.2%
1920	1,536		−20.7%
1930	1,434		−6.6%
1940	1,489		3.8%
1950	1,781		19.6%
1960	1,972		10.7%
1970	2,068		4.9%
1980	3,050		47.5%
1990	3,371		10.5%
2000	3,417		1.4%
2010	3,370		−1.4%
2020	3,226		−4.3%
U.S. Decennial Census 2020

=== 2000 ===
As of the census of 2000, there were 3,417 people, 1,269 households, and 949 families residing in the town. The population density was 82.2 inhabitants per square mile (31.7/km^{2}). There were 1,406 housing units at an average density of 33.8 per square mile (13.1/km^{2}). The racial makeup of the town was 97.40% White, 0.70% African American, 0.12% Native American, 0.38% Asian, 0.03% Pacific Islander, 0.44% from other races, and 0.94% from two or more races. Hispanic or Latino of any race were 1.61% of the population.

There were 1,269 households, out of which 32.2% had children under the age of 18 living with them, 62.6% were married couples living together, 7.5% had a female householder with no husband present, and 25.2% were non-families. 20.1% of all households were made up of individuals, and 7.0% had someone living alone who was 65 years of age or older. The average household size was 2.62 and the average family size was 3.02.

The age distribution of the town was 24.2% under 18, 5.6% from 18 to 24, 27.1% from 25 to 44, 29.6% from 45 to 64, and 13.4% who were 65 or older. The median age was 41 years. For every 100 females, there were 96.6 males. For every 100 females age 18 and over, there were 97.8 males.

The median income for a household in the town was $48,136, and the median income for a family was $50,175. Males had a median income of $36,681 versus $29,327 for females. The per capita income for the town was $20,636. About 5.3% of families and 7.2% of the population were below the poverty line, including 9.7% of those under age 18 and 10.9% of those age 65 or over.

== Communities and locations in New Baltimore ==
- Deans Mill – A hamlet in the northern part of the town
- Grapeville – A hamlet near the western town line on Route 26
- Hannacroix – A hamlet southwest of New Baltimore hamlet
- Houghtaling Island – An island in the Hudson River, which is mostly within the town.
- Medway – A hamlet in the southwestern part of the town
- New Baltimore – The hamlet of New Baltimore in the northeastern part of the town, next to the Hudson River
- Otter Hook – A hamlet in the eastern part of the town
- Paradise Hill – A hamlet near the southern town line, south of Medway
- Roberts Hill – A hamlet in the southeastern part of the town
