= Prattsville Commercial Building =

Historic commercial building in New York, United States

- U.S. National Register of Historic Places
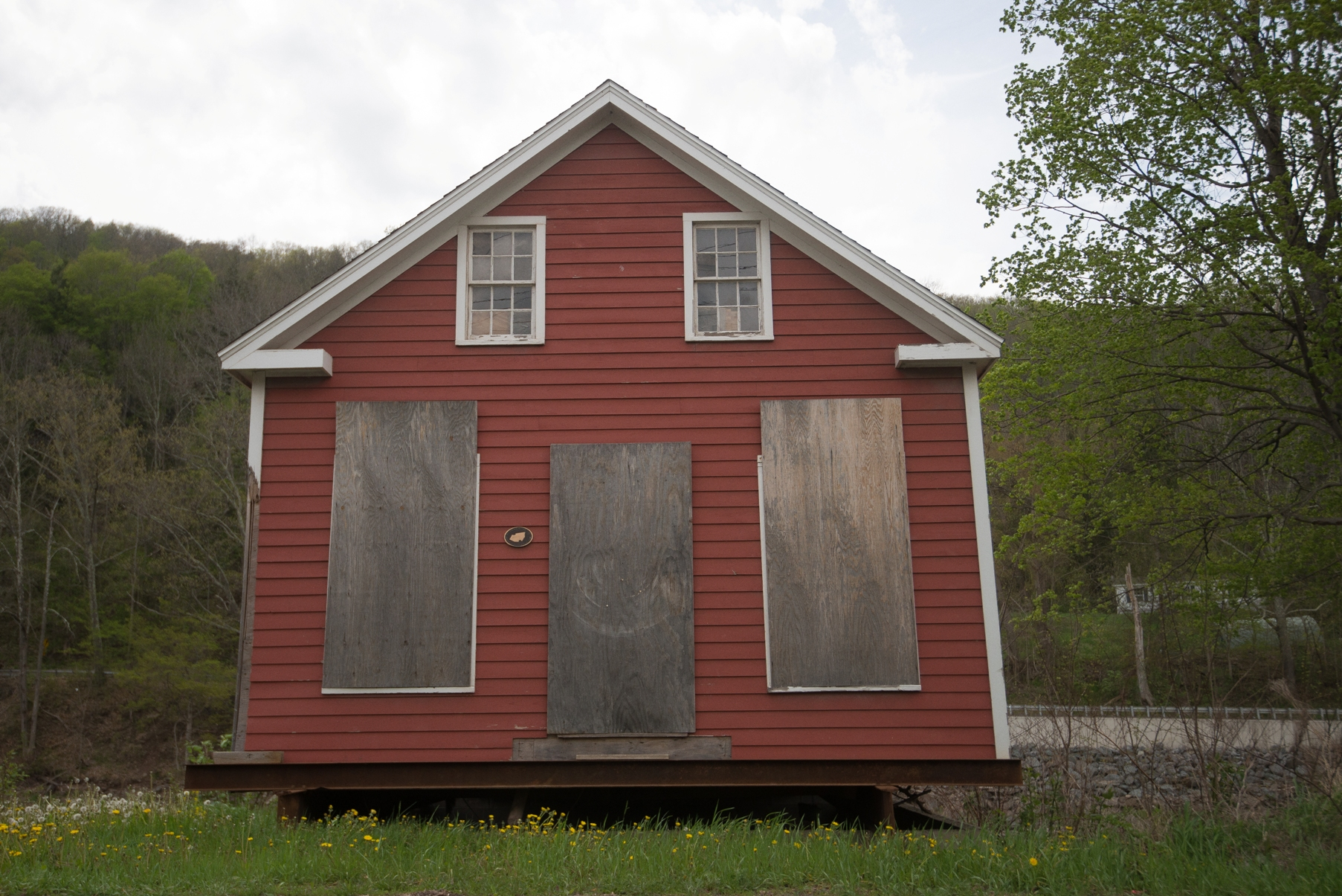
- Front elevation, 2016

- Location within New York Location within the United States
- Location: NY 23, Prattsville, New York
- Coordinates: 42°19′1″N 74°26′6″W
- Area: less than one acre
- Built: 1824
- Architect: Pratt, Zadock
- NRHP reference No.: 96000203
- Added to NRHP: March 1, 1996

The Prattsville Commercial Building is a historic commercial building located at Prattsville in Greene County, New York. It was built about 1824 and is a 1 1/2-story building constructed of massive hemlock timber frame on a dry laid fieldstone foundation. It is built into the side of the east bank of Schoharie Creek. It was built by Zadock Pratt (1790–1871), founder of Prattsville.

It was listed on the National Register of Historic Places in 1996.
