= Zadock Pratt House =

Historic house in New York, United States

- U.S. National Register of Historic Places
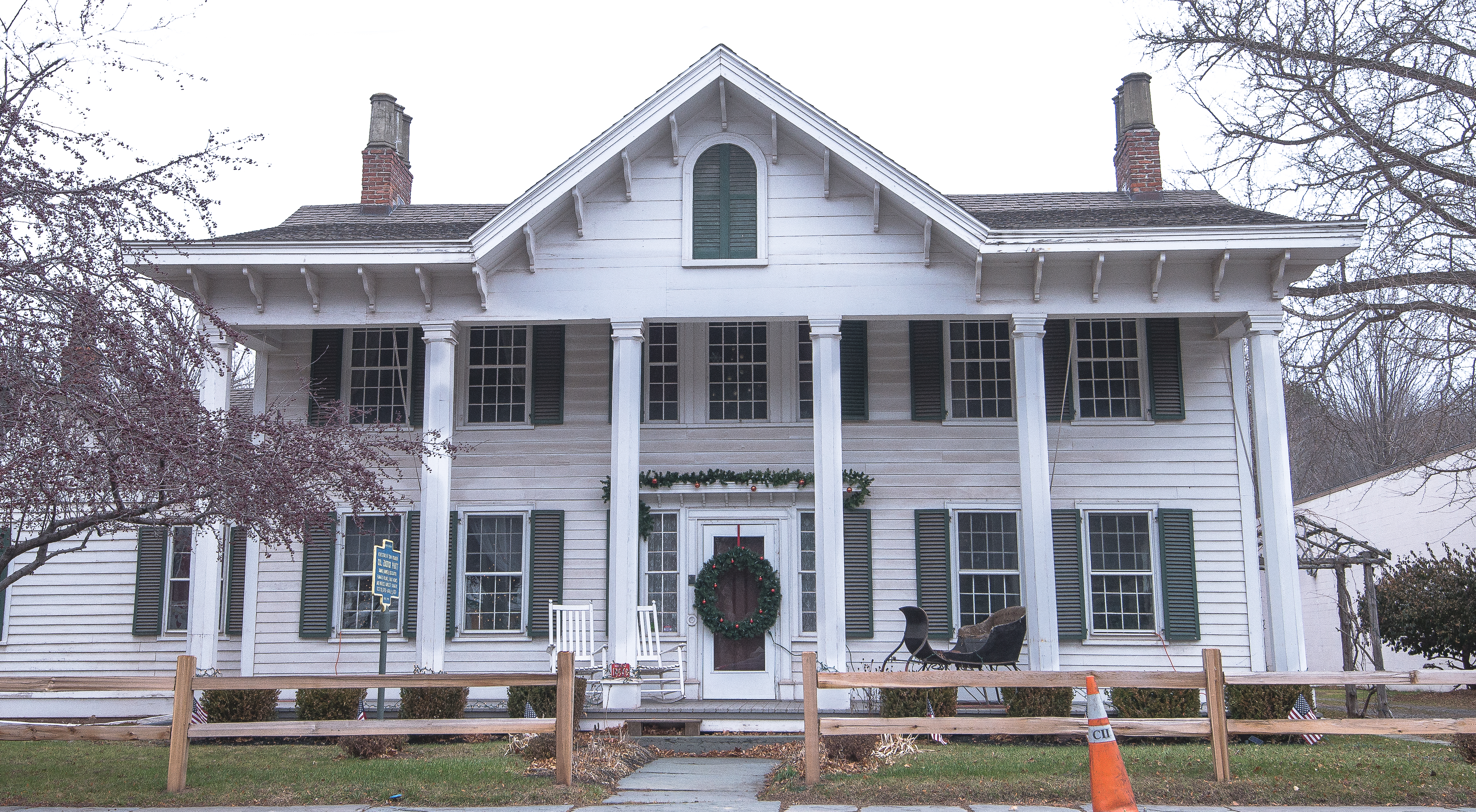
- Zadock Pratt House, December 2015

- Location within New York Location within the United States
- Location: Main St., Prattsville, New York
- Coordinates: 42°18′52″N 74°25′56″W
- Area: 0.5 acres (0.20 ha)
- Built: 1828
- Architect: Wood, David
- Architectural style: Greek Revival, Federal, Picturesque
- NRHP reference No.: 86001654
- Added to NRHP: August 14, 1986

Zadock Pratt House, also known as the Zadock Pratt Museum, is a historic home located at Prattsville in Greene County, New York. It was originally built in 1828 as a two-story, five-bay Federal style residence. It was substantially altered about 1856 with the addition of numerous architectural details reminiscent of the romantic, picturesque tastes in mid-19th century America. It is a frame structure constructed of massive hemlock posts and beams over a stone foundation. It features broadly projecting eaves and a two-story portico supported by octagonal columns. Also on the property is the original well. It was the home of Zadock Pratt (1790–1871), founder of Prattsville. It has operated as a house museum since 1959. In 2011 the ground floor was damaged heavily by Hurricane Irene.

It was listed on the National Register of Historic Places in 1986. To this day there still stands two Ginkgo trees (one male and one female) planted circa 1825 by Pratt. The trees were brought by Pratt from China.

== Gallery ==
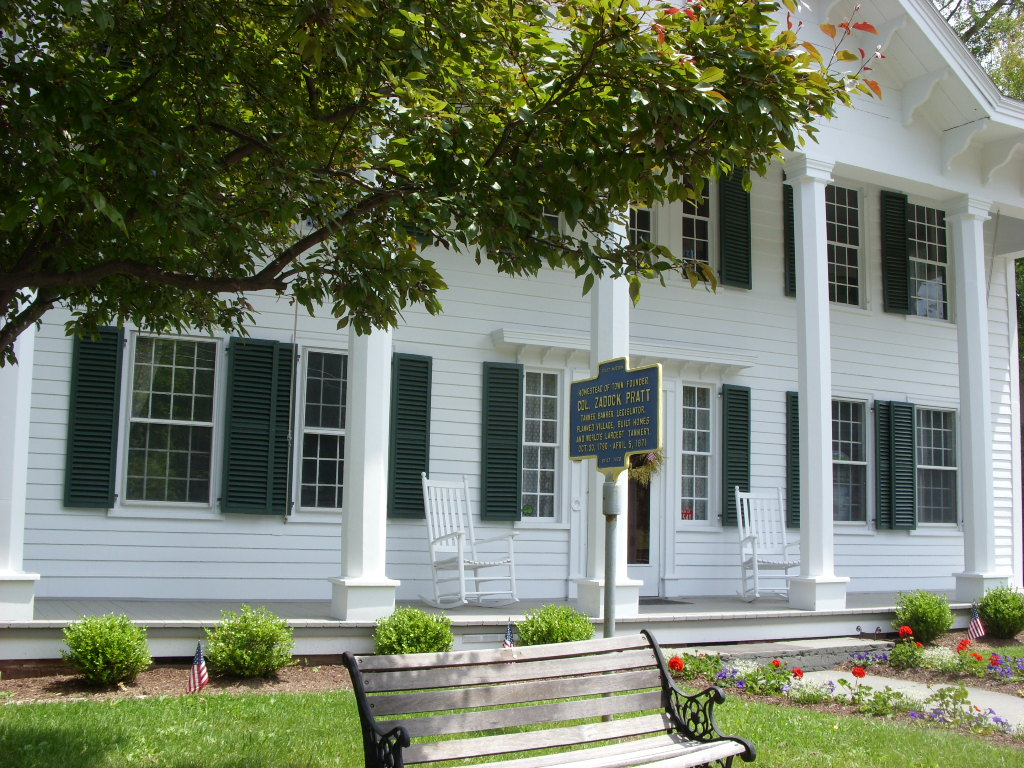
Zadock Pratt House, June 2009
