= Pratt Rock =

- Pratt Rock Park
- U.S. National Register of Historic Places
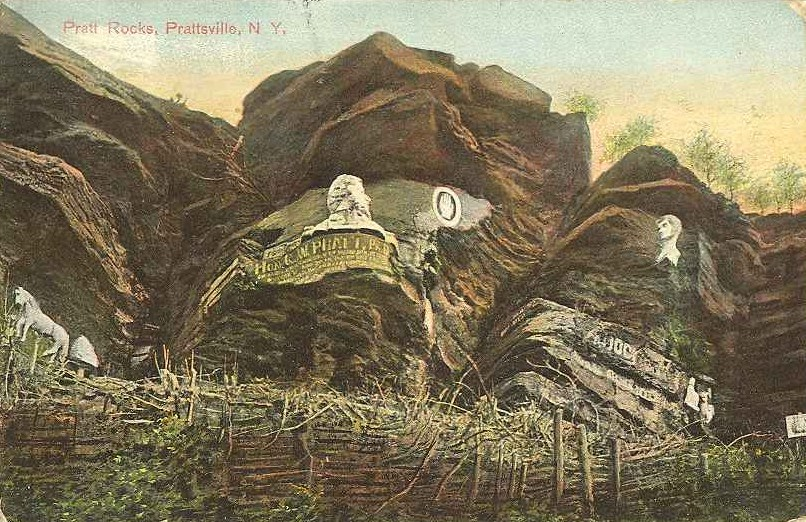
- Location: NY 23 NW of jct. with NY 23A
- Nearest city: Prattsville, New York
- Coordinates: 42°18′43″N 74°24′39″W
- Built: 1843
- NRHP reference No.: 92001645
- Added to NRHP: December 10, 1992

Pratt Rock, also known as Pratt's Rock, is a rockface or other landform that includes a series of stone carvings in Prattsville, New York, depicting the life of Zadock Pratt. Pratt was supposed to be buried in a tomb carved into the stone, but work was stopped after only a small recessed chamber was created because water leaked through the rock overhead, and excavating the stone was proving to be too difficult. The rock was originally a monument for Pratt's son, George W. Pratt, who was killed in the Civil War. It is considered the first memorial for the Civil War.

Ripley's Believe it or Not once called it "New York's Mt. Rushmore".

As Pratt Rock Park, the place was listed on the U.S. National Register of Historic Places in 1992.

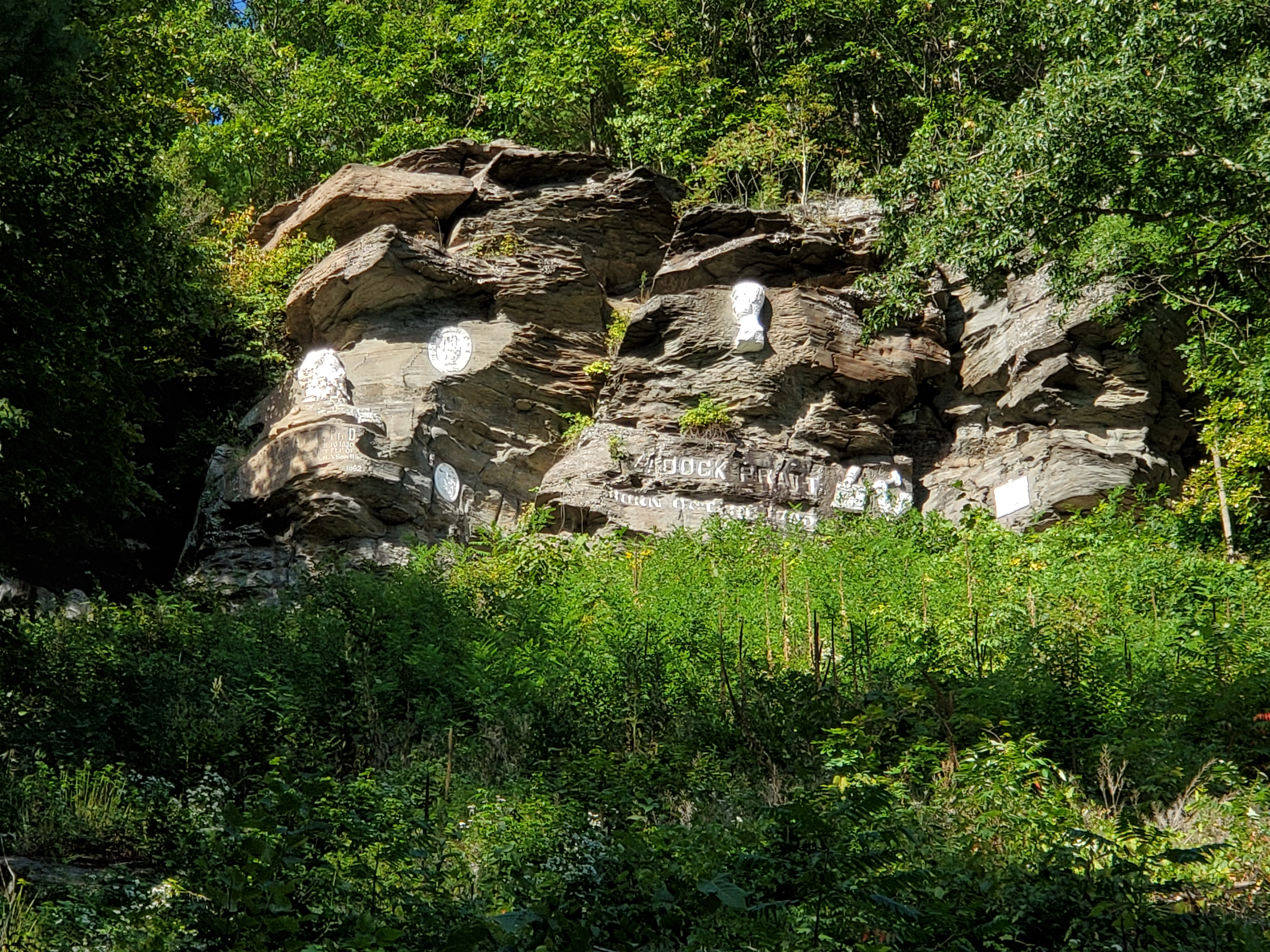
Pratt Rock as viewed from below

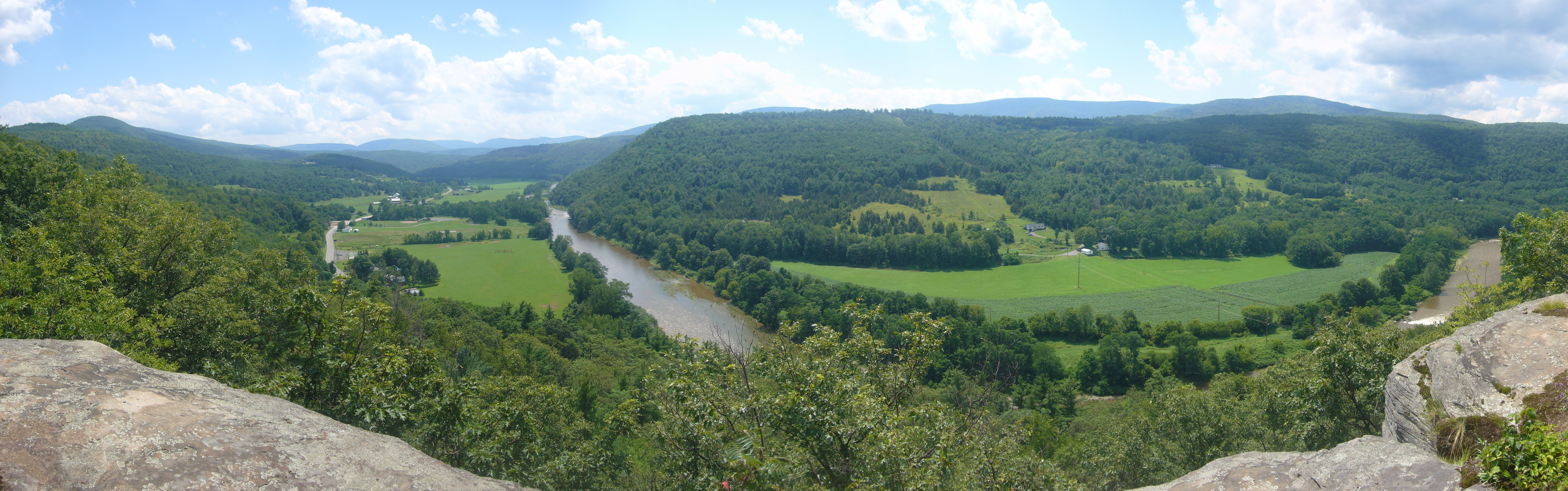
View from the top of Pratt Rock. The Schoharie Creek can be seen in the valley.
