= Carthage, Watertown and Sackets Harbor Railroad =

Map

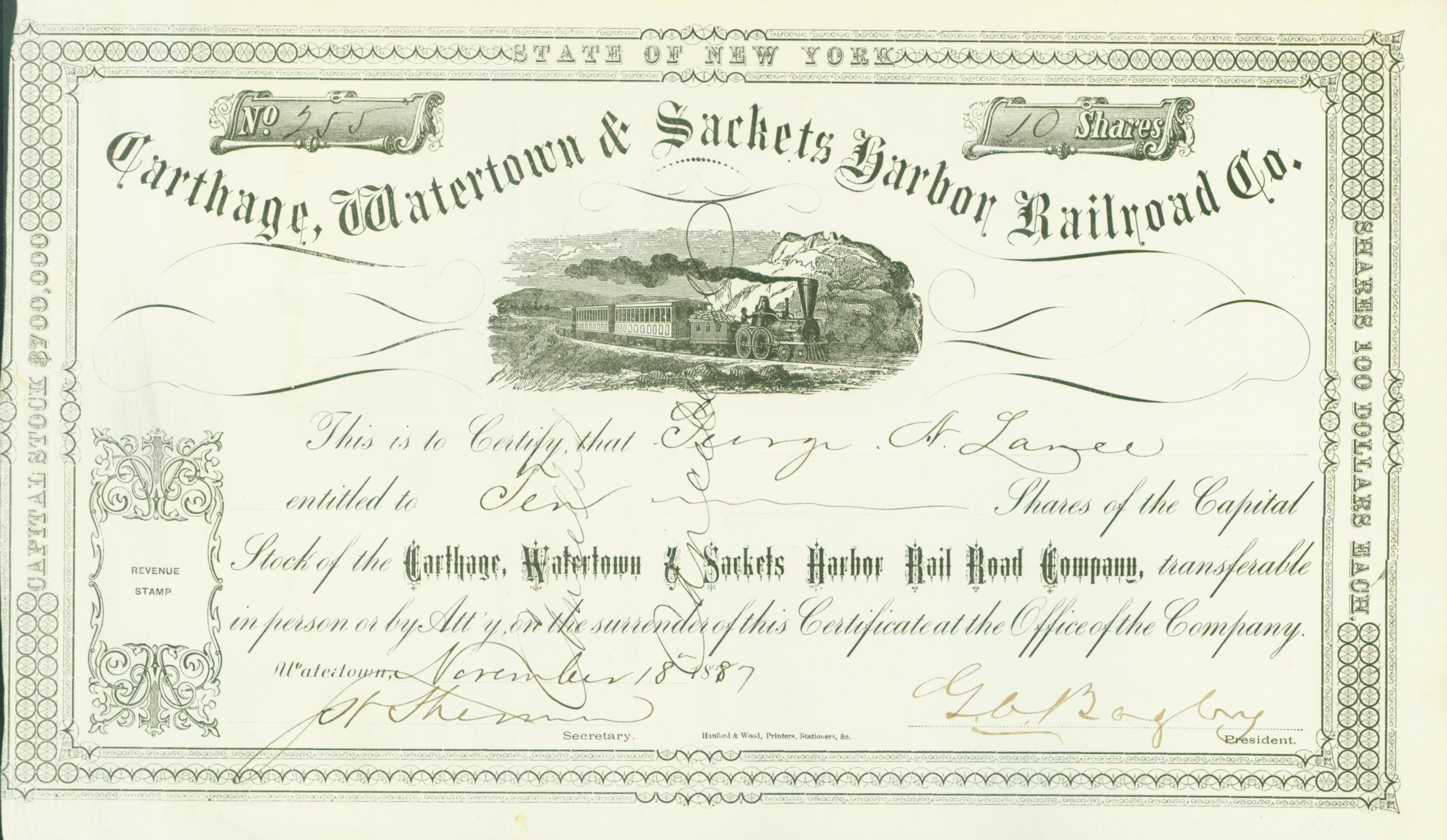
Share of the Carthage, Watertown and Sackets Harbor Railroad Company, issued 18 November 1887

The Carthage, Watertown and Sackets Harbor Railroad was incorporated in 1871 with the route itself opening for operation in 1875. It was built within the village of Sackets Harbor on the railbed of the former Sackets Harbor and Ellisburg Railroad. It was incorporated into the New York Central Railroad in 1893. It ceased operating in 1949. It went from Sackets Harbor eastward to join the Rome, Watertown and Ogdensburg Railroad at Watertown.
