= 23rd New York Infantry Regiment =

- Active: May 10, 1861, to May 22, 1863
- Country: United States
- Allegiance: Union
- Branch: Infantry
- Engagements: Battle of Groveton/Brawner's Farm; Second Battle of Bull Run; Battle of South Mountain; Battle of Antietam; Battle of Fredericksburg; Battle of Chancellorsville

Insignia
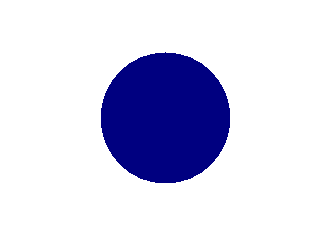
- 3rd Division, I Corps

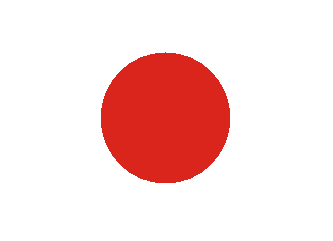
- 1st Division, I Corps

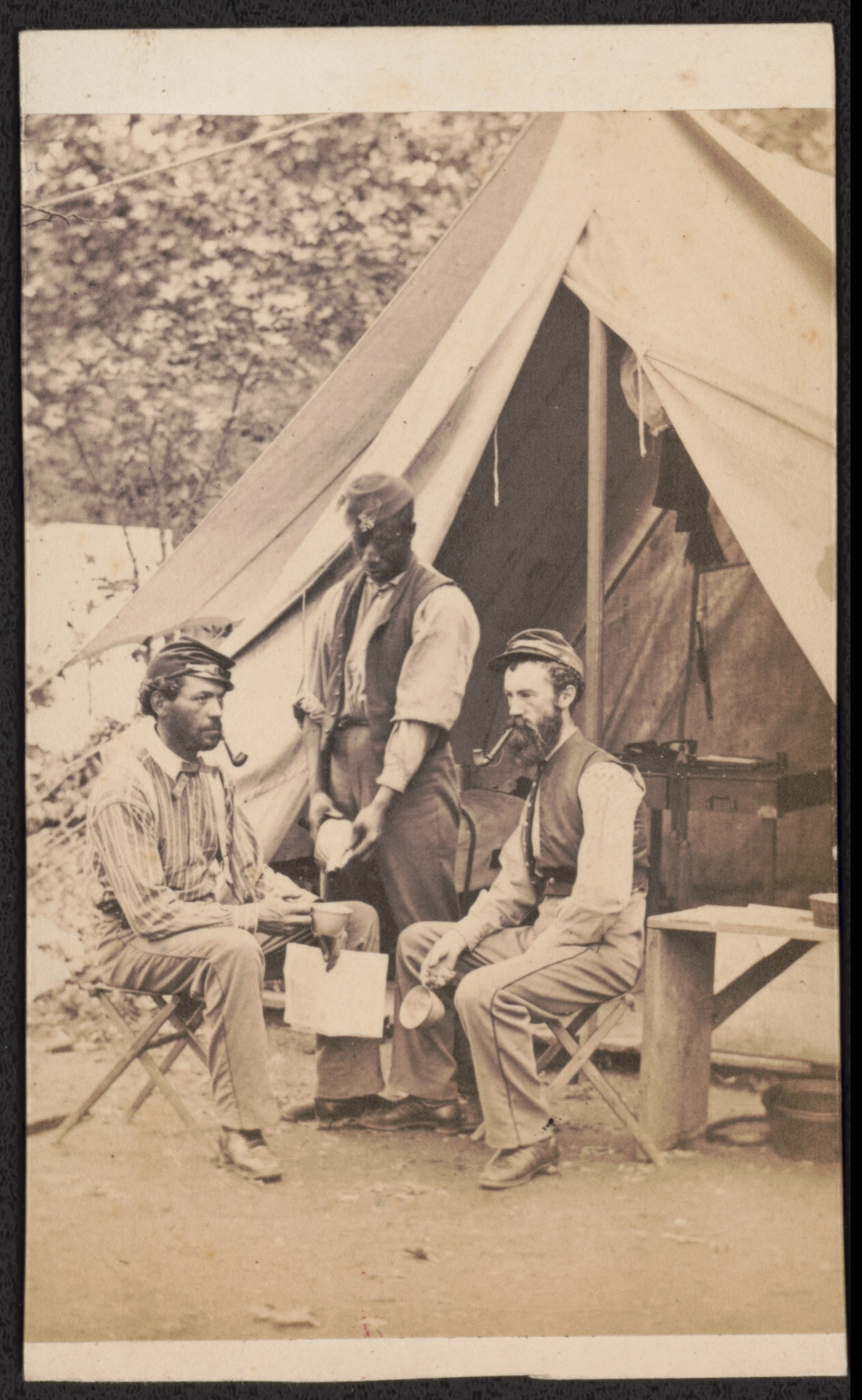
Captain William W. Dingeldy of Co. F, 23rd New York Infantry Regiment and his servant with Sergeant Lucian W. Bingham of Co. K, 23rd New York Infantry Regiment in camp at Arlington, Virginia. From the Liljenquist Family Collection of Civil War Photographs, Prints and Photographs Division, Library of Congress

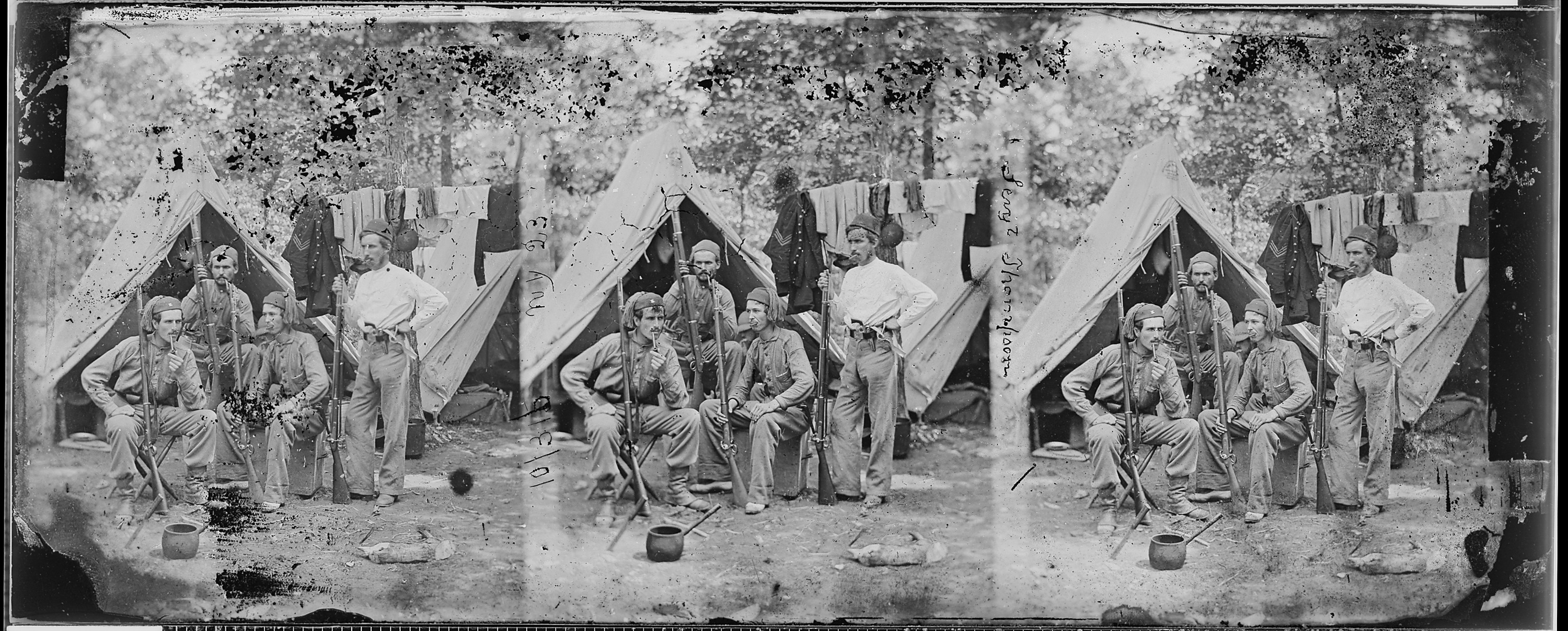
Sergt. Thompson, 23rd N.Y. Volunteers

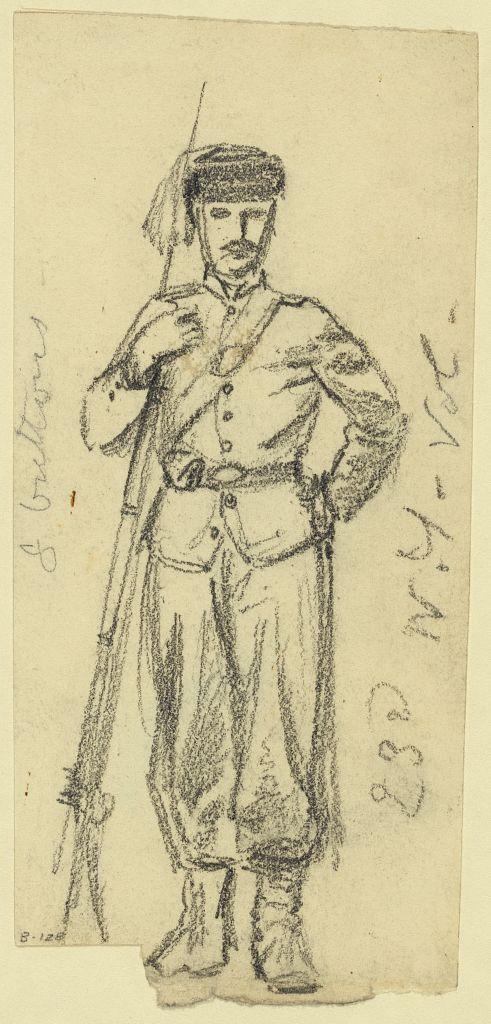
A soldier from the 23rd New York drawn by Alfred Waud.

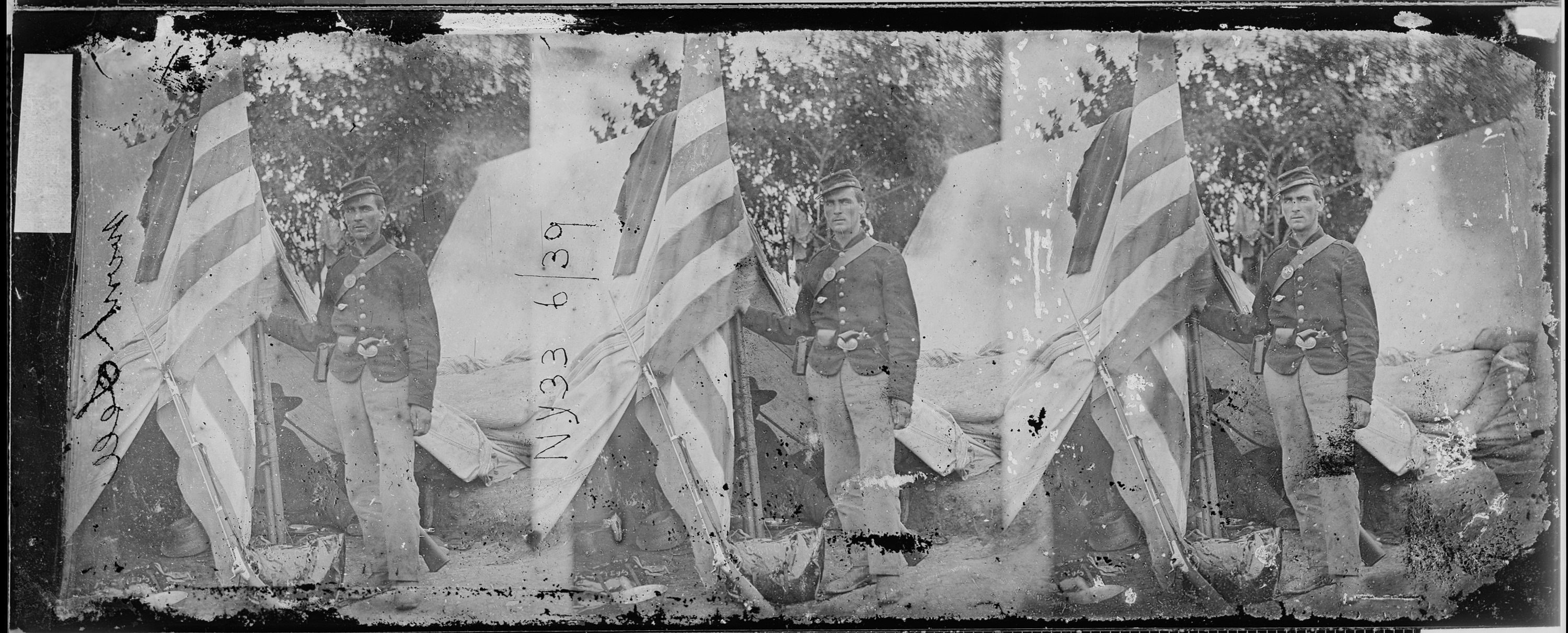
Colors of 23rd Infantry, N.Y - NARA - 529517

The 23rd New York Infantry Regiment, the "Southern Tier Regiment", was an infantry regiment of the Union Army during the American Civil War.

== Service ==
The regiment was organized in Elmira, New York, on May 16, 1861, and was mustered in for a two-year enlistment on July 2, 1861, by Colonel Henry C. Hoffman.

The regiment left the State July 5, 1861; served at and near Washington, D. C., from July 7, 1861; in Hunter's, then Sedgwick's, then Keyes', Brigade, Division of the Potomac, from August 4, 1861; in Wadsworth's Brigade, McDowell's Division, Army of the Potomac, from October 15, 1861; in 2d, Patrick's, Brigade, 3d, King's, Division, 1st Corps, Army of the Potomac, from March 13, 1862; in 2d Brigade, King's Division, Department of the Rappahannock, from May, 1862; in 3d Brigade, 1st Division, 3d Corps, Army of Virginia, from June 26, 1862; in the same brigade and division, 1st Corps, Army of the Potomac, from September 12, 1862; in Patrick's Provost Guard Brigade, Army of the Potomac, from January, 1863; at Aquia Creek, Virginia, from April 29, 1863.

The regiment was mustered out of service on May 22, 1863, and those men who had signed three-year enlistments were transferred to the 80th New York.

== Total strength and casualties ==
The regiment suffered 17 enlisted men killed in action or mortally wounded and two officers and 53 enlisted men who died of disease, for a total of 72 fatalities.

== Commanders ==
- Colonel Henry C. Hoffman
- Lieutenant Colonel Newton T. Colby

== See also ==
- List of New York Civil War regiments
