= Marsena R. Patrick =

Union Army general

Marsena Rudolph Patrick
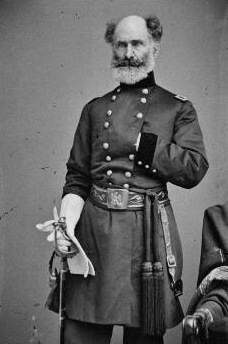
- Marsena R. Patrick
- Born: March 15, 1811; Hounsfield, New York, U.S.
- Died: July 27, 1888 (aged 77); Dayton, Ohio, U.S.
- Burial place: Dayton National Cemetery, Dayton, Ohio
- Military career
- Allegiance: United States of America; Union
- Branch: United States Army; Union Army
- Service years: 1835–1850; 1861–1865
- Rank: Brigadier General; Brevet Major General
- Conflicts: Second Seminole War; Mexican-American War; American Civil War; Jackson's Valley campaign; Northern Virginia campaign; Second Battle of Bull Run; Battle of Chantilly; Maryland campaign; Battle of South Mountain; Battle of Antietam; Gettysburg campaign; Battle of Gettysburg

Marsena Rudolph Patrick (March 15, 1811 – July 27, 1888) was a college president and an officer in the United States Army, serving as a general in the Union volunteer forces during the American Civil War. He was the provost marshal for the Army of the Potomac in many of its campaigns.

== Early life ==
Patrick was born in Hounsfield, Jefferson County, New York (near Watertown). He worked on the Erie Canal and briefly taught school. He was appointed to the United States Military Academy in nearby West Point, and graduated in 1835. Initially appointed a brevet second lieutenant in the infantry, he was promoted to first lieutenant in 1839, serving in the Seminole Wars. Patrick served in the Mexican–American War and was again promoted, this time to captain, in 1847. He was appointed brevet major in 1849 for "meritorious conduct while serving in the enemy's country." However, Patrick decided to resign from the Army in 1850 and returned to New York.

For a time, he was president of the Sackett's Harbor and Ellisburgh Railroad, as well as becoming an expert farmer, studying and using the latest scientific advances to prosper. In 1859, Patrick was appointed President of the New York State Agricultural College, serving in that role for two years before the outbreak of the Civil War, when Patrick enlisted in the New York state militia as inspector general in early 1861.

== Civil War ==
In March 1862, Patrick was appointed as a brigadier general of volunteers. His brigade was assigned to the division of Brig. Gen. Rufus King in the army of Maj. Gen. Irvin McDowell and sent to the Shenandoah Valley in northern Virginia, where Patrick's men occasionally fought against Confederates under Stonewall Jackson. He was subsequently appointed military governor of Fredericksburg, Virginia, in April 1862. Transferred later in the year to the Army of the Potomac under Maj. Gen. George B. McClellan, he commanded the 2nd Brigade, 3rd Division, I Corps in the defenses of Washington, D.C.. Patrick's brigade (renumbered as the 3rd Brigade) suffered hundreds of casualties in the Maryland Campaign, seeing action at the battles of South Mountain and Antietam.

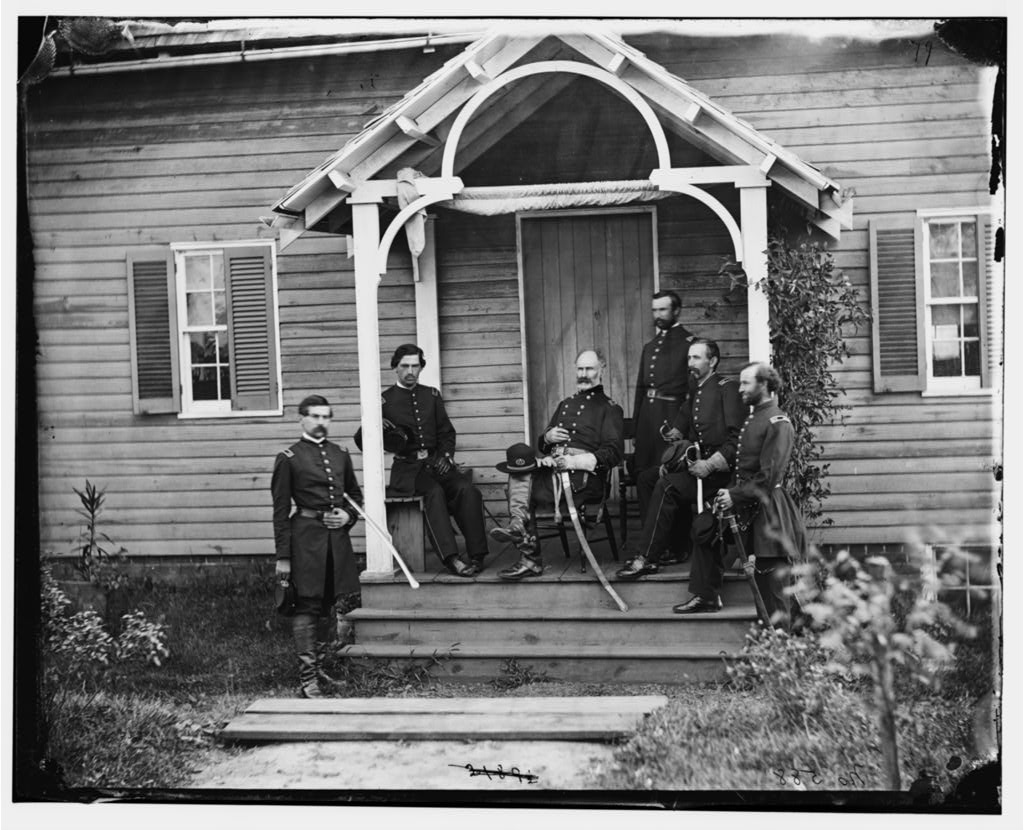
Patrick (center, seated with hat on his knee) and staff at Culpeper, Virginia, in 1863.

In the reorganization of the command structure following Antietam, Patrick was named as the provost marshal for the Army of the Potomac on October 6, 1862. To support his efforts, he had the equivalent of a brigade of troops, including at various times:

- McClellan (Illinois) Dragoons (Companies A & B)
- 9th New York Infantry (Company G)
- 93rd New York Infantry
- 2nd U.S. Cavalry
- 8th U.S. Infantry
- 2nd Pennsylvania Cavalry
- 6th Pennsylvania Cavalry (Companies E&I)
- Regular cavalry
- 21st New York
- 23rd New York
- 35th New York
- 80th New York (20th Militia)
- Maryland Light Artillery, Battery B
- Ohio Light Artillery, 12th Battery

Patrick tried vainly to stop vengeful Union soldiers from sacking and looting Fredericksburg in November, and had to fend off political officials who placed the blame on him, including numerous inquiries from Secretary of War Edwin Stanton. Nevertheless, Patrick continued in the role of provost marshal throughout 1863. New army commander Maj. Gen. Joseph Hooker had Patrick create the Bureau of Military Information, a network of intelligence agents. At the Battle of Gettysburg, Patrick oversaw the processing of thousands of Confederate prisoners of war. In early 1864, when Ulysses S. Grant arrived in the Eastern Theater and assumed authority over multiple armies, Patrick was elevated to provost marshal for the combined forces operating against Richmond, Virginia.

== Postwar career ==
Following the surrender of Robert E. Lee in April 1865, Patrick remained in northern Virginia as provost of the District of Henrico in the Department of Virginia. Although appointed a brevet major general in the volunteer army, Patrick resigned from the Army a second time on June 12, 1865, preferring to return to civilian life rather than accept a role in the smaller Reconstruction era.

In 1865, he ran on the Democratic ticket for New York State Treasurer but was defeated by Republican Joseph Howland.

Patrick moved to Manlius, New York, and from 1867 through 1868, Patrick served as president of the New York State Agricultural Society; then spent the next two years as a state commissioner, a role he again held from 1879 through 1880. He became a widely known public speaker, particularly on topics related to technological advances in agriculture. Interested in the care of former soldiers, Patrick moved to Ohio and became the governor of the central branch of the National Home for Disabled Volunteer Soldiers. A large tombstone bearing his name and rank stands in the Manlius Village Cemetery.

Marsena Patrick died in Dayton, Ohio, and was buried in the Dayton National Cemetery. (See preceding paragraph) His diary (Inside Lincoln's Army: The Diary of Marsena Rudolph Patrick, Provost Marshal General, Army of the Potomac), frequently critical of the Army's commanders, was published in 1964.

== In popular culture ==
Patrick appears briefly in the 2003 Civil War film Gods and Generals, portrayed by Ryan Cutrona. During scenes depicting the Battle of Fredericksburg, he is seen berating soldiers looting the town, and ordering his guard to put a stop to the vandalism.

== See also ==
- List of American Civil War generals (Union)
