= George S. Nichols =

American politician

George Sylvester Nichols

Member of the New York State Senate from the 10th district
- In office 1856–1857
- Preceded by: Eliakim Sherrill
- Succeeded by: George W. Pratt

Personal details
- Born: January 12, 1820 Athens, New York, U.S.
- Died: May 29, 1916 (aged 96)

George Sylvester Nichols (January 12, 1820 – May 29, 1916) was an American politician and Union Army officer from New York.

== Life ==
Nichols was born on January 12, 1820, in Athens, New York. His parents were Sylvester Nichols, a judge and assemblyman, and Lucy Hamilton. In 1832, he entered Lenox Academy. In 1834, he began attending Fairfield Academy. In 1837, he studied in Kinderhook Academy, which was founded by his grandfather.

From 1838 to 1846, Nichols was the captain of his father's sloop Science, which carried goods from Athens to New York City. In 1843, he was commissioned brigade quartermaster of the Thirty-Seventh Brigade of the New York State Militia. In 1845, he was appointed brigadier-general of the Brigade. From 1847 to 1848, he worked as superintendent for Colonel J. Hooker's docks in Troy. In 1849, he travelled to California and worked in packing and training in Sutter's Mill. He returned to Athens in 1851. In 1851, he was elected town supervisor of Athens. In 1855, he was elected to the New York State Senate under the American Party, representing the 10th District. He served in the State Senate in 1856 and 1857. In 1860, he was appointed to the Board of Commissioners of Excise for Greene County.

In November 1861, when the American Civil War began, Nichols enrolled in the Union Army. He was mustered in the 9th New York Volunteer Cavalry Regiment as a major. In May 1863, he was promoted to lieutenant-colonel. After Colonel William H. Sackett died in June 1864, he was promoted to colonel and took command of the Regiment. He was mustered out with the rest of the regiment in July 1865. He took part in more than 60 engagements, including the Siege of Yorktown, the Second Battle of Bull Run, the Battle of Fredericksburg, the Battle of Culpeper Court House, the Battle of the Wilderness, and the Battle of Trevilian Station, where Colonel Sackett was killed. At the end of the war, he was commissioned brevet brigadier general.

In 1867, Collector of the Port of New York Henry A. Smythe appointed Nichols as Inspector of Customs for the New York Custom House. In 1875, Chester A. Arthur appointed him Deputy Collector of Customs. In the 1878 United States House of Representatives election, he was the Republican candidate for the New York's 15th congressional district, but he lost the election. In 1882, Secretary of the Interior Henry M. Teller appointed him Special Examiner in the Pension Office, a position he served in for three years. In 1885, he was elected County Clerk of Greene County.

In 1845, Nichols married Ann Netterville Foster. Their four children were Mary, Foster, Charles E., and Arthur. He was a freemason and an Episcopalian.

Nichols died at home on May 29, 1916. When he died, he was the oldest surviving commanding officer from the Civil War. He was buried in Athens Rural Cemetery.

New York State Senate
Preceded by Eliakim Sherrill	New York State Senate; 10th District; 1856-1857	Succeeded by George W. Pratt
