= George W. Pratt =

American politician

George Watson Pratt

Member of the New York Senate from the 10th district
- In office 1858–1859
- Preceded by: George S. Nichols
- Succeeded by: Joshua Fiero Jr.

Personal details
- Born: April 18, 1830
- Died: September 11, 1862 (aged 32)

Military service
- Allegiance: United States
- Branch/service: Union Army
- Commands: 20th New York State Militia Regiment "Ulster Guards"
- Battles/wars: American Civil War

George Watson Pratt (April 18, 1830 – September 11, 1862) was an American politician and Union Army officer from New York.

== Life ==
He was the son of Congressman Zadock Pratt (1790–1871) and Abigail P. (Watson) Pratt (1807–1834), born in that part of Windham which in 1833 was separated as the Town of Prattsville, in Greene County, New York. In 1855, he married Anna Attwood Tibbits (1833–1921), and they had three children. He removed to Kingston, New York, and became engaged in the manufacture of leather there and in New York City.

He was Quartermaster General of the State Militia from 1853 to 1854.

He was a member of the New York State Senate (10th D.) in 1858 and 1859.

In 1860, he published An Account of the British Expedition Above the Highlands of the Hudson River; And of the Events Connected with the Burning of Kingston in 1777.

He was a colonel of the State Militia, commanding the 20th New York State Militia Regiment "Ulster Guards", and fought with them in the American Civil War. He was shot in the left shoulder and spine at the Second Battle of Bull Run, and died from his wounds about two weeks later in Albany, New York. He was buried at Albany Rural Cemetery in Menands, New York.

== Sources ==
- The New York Civil List compiled by Franklin Benjamin Hough, Stephen C. Hutchins and Edgar Albert Werner (1867; pg. 401 and 442)
- Biographical Sketches of the State Officers and Members of the Legislature of the State of New York in 1859 by William D. Murray (pg. 82ff)

New York State Senate
Preceded by George S. Nichols	New York State Senate; 10th District; 1858–1859	Succeeded by Joshua Fiero Jr.
