= Old Episcopal Manse =

- U.S. National Register of Historic Places
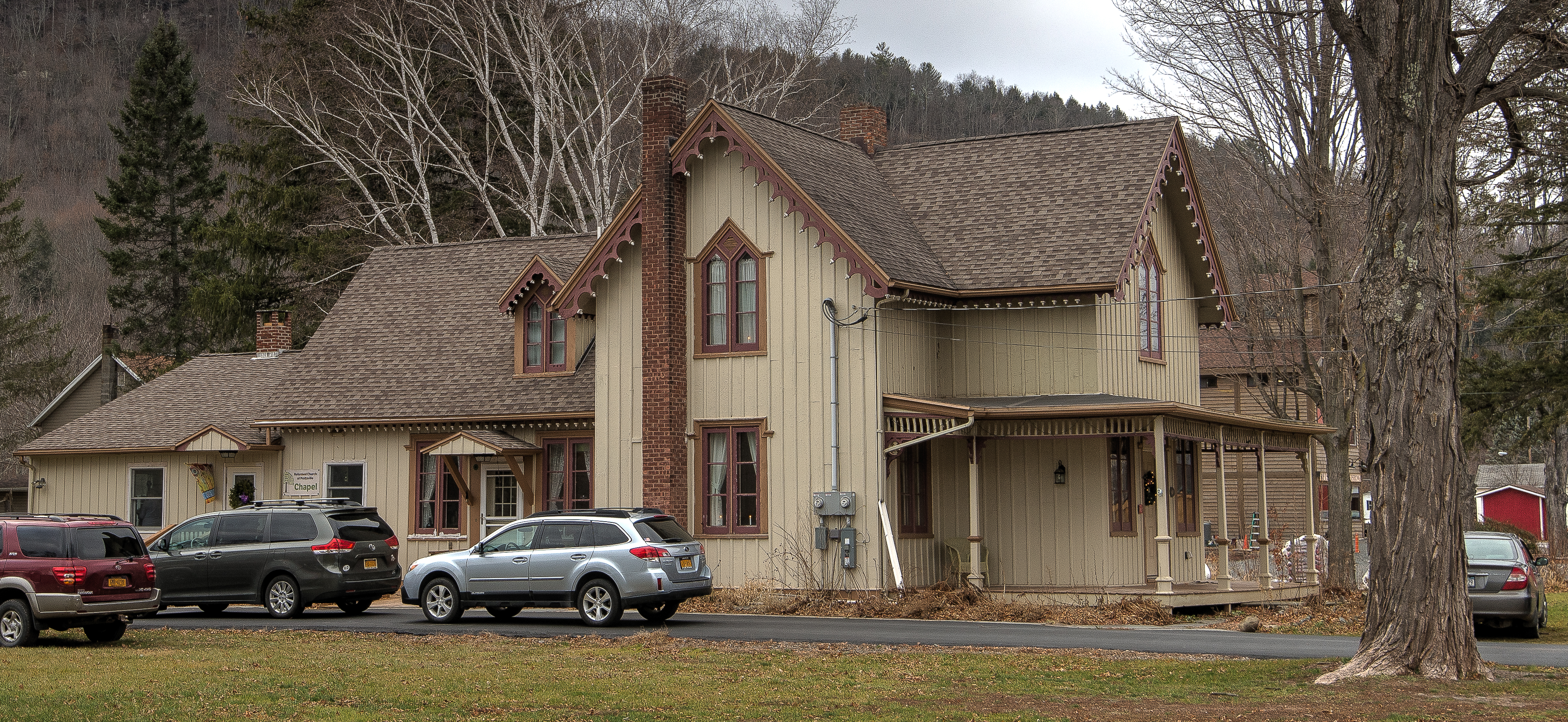
- Old Episcopal Manse, December 2015

- Location within New York Location within the United States
- Location: NY 23, Main St., Prattsville, New York
- Coordinates: 42°18′51″N 74°25′59″W
- Area: less than one acre
- Built: 1845
- Architectural style: Gothic Revival
- NRHP reference No.: 00001415
- Added to NRHP: November 22, 2000

Old Episcopal Manse is a historic Episcopal manse building on New York State Route 23, Main Street in Prattsville, Greene County, New York. It was built about 1845 and is a 1 1/2-story, cross-gable house type with Gothic Revival style features. It features board and batten siding and a steeply pitched gable roof. Also on the property is a carriage house, also built about 1845.

It was added to the National Register of Historic Places in 2000.
