= Eliakim Sherrill =

American politician (1813–1863)

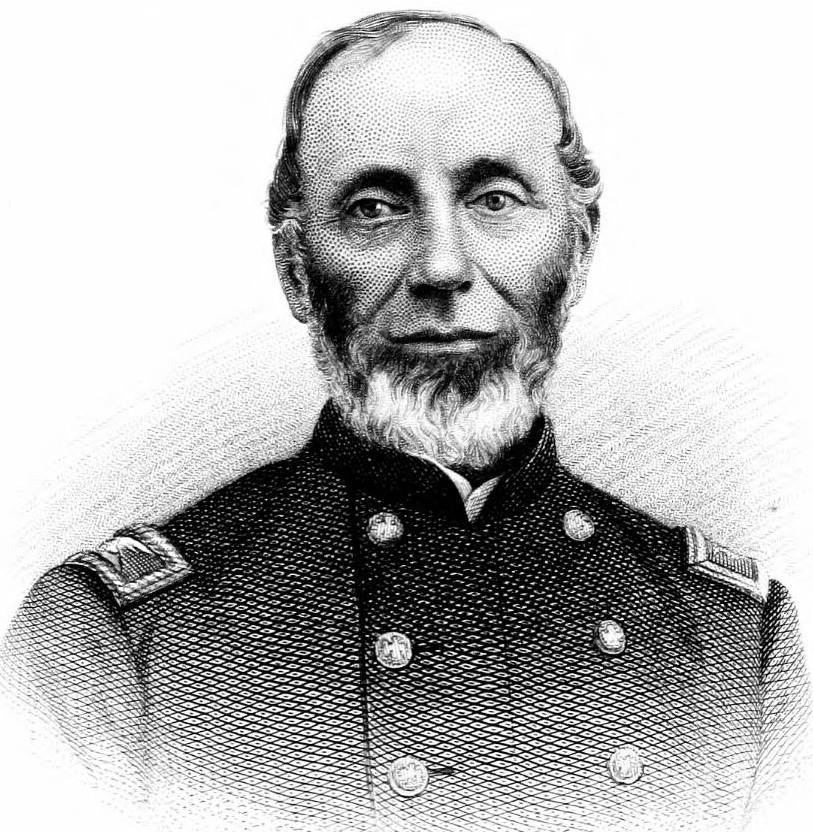

Member of the U.S. House of Representatives from New York's 10th district
- In office March 4, 1847 – March 3, 1849
- Preceded by: Samuel Gordon
- Succeeded by: Herman D. Gould

Member of the New York Senate from the 10th district
- In office 1854–1855
- Preceded by: George T. Pierce
- Succeeded by: George S. Nichols

Personal details
- Born: February 16, 1813 Greenville, New York, US
- Died: July 4, 1863 (aged 50) Gettysburg, Pennsylvania, US
- Resting place: Washington Street Cemetery; 42°51′44″N 76°59′27″W
- Party: Republican
- Other political affiliations: Whig

Military service
- Allegiance: United States (Union)
- Branch/service: Union Army
- Years of service: 1861-1863
- Rank: Colonel
- Commands: 126th New York Volunteer Infantry
- Battles/wars: American Civil War; Battle of Harpers Ferry (WIA); Battle of Gettysburg (DOW)

Eliakim Sherrill (February 16, 1813 – July 4, 1863) was an antebellum United States Congressman from the state of New York and a brigade commander in the Union Army during the American Civil War. He was mortally wounded during the Battle of Gettysburg defending against Pickett's Charge.

== Early life ==
Sherrill was born in Greenville, New York, where he attended public schools. He moved to Herkimer County in 1832. He married Emily Eldridge, a daughter of Judge Eldridge of Madison County. The couple moved to Shandaken in 1838, where Sherrill owned a tannery. He entered local politics, and held several political offices. He served as a major in the State Militia.

He was elected as a Whig to the 30th United States Congress, and held office from March 4, 1847, to March 3, 1849. He was a member of the New York State Senate (10th D.) in 1854 and 1855. Three years later, he moved to Brooklyn, then in 1860 to Geneva, where he had a farm.

== Civil War ==
During the Civil War, he organized the 126th New York Infantry in August 1862 and became its first colonel. His regiment was among the troops defending Harpers Ferry against Joseph B. Kershaw's Confederate brigade of Maj. Gen. Lafayette McLaws's division during the Maryland Campaign. He was severely wounded with a gunshot through his lower jaw in fighting on Maryland Heights during the Battle of Harpers Ferry. Sherrill was captured and later paroled. The wound never healed, but he temporarily rejoined his regiment at Union Mills, Virginia, in October 1862. After a furlough for further recuperation, he returned for duty on January 27, 1863.

He commanded the 3rd Brigade, 3rd Division, II Corps, after Col. George L. Willard's death on July 2, 1863, at the Battle of Gettysburg. Sherrill, in his first full day commanding the brigade, was positioned near Ziegler's Grove on Cemetery Ridge, when he was mortally wounded on July 3 by a musket shot in the bowels. Carried off the field by men of the 39th New York Infantry, he was taken to the XI Corps field hospital, where he died about 8:00 a.m. the next day. His body was sent by the regimental surgeon to Baltimore for embalming. Lt. Col. James M. Bull, 126th New York Infantry, who filed the brigade's report, giving a detailed account of the artillery barrage on July 3 but not much on the repulse of Pickett's Charge, places Sherrill's death at 4 p.m.

His granddaughter, Carrie Babcock Sherman, was Second Lady of the United States, 1909-1912.

== See also ==
- Mount Sherrill, one of the Catskill High Peaks, named in his memory

== Notes ==
U.S. House of Representatives
Preceded by Samuel Gordon	Member of the U.S. House of Representatives from New York's 10th congressional district 1847–1849	Succeeded by Herman D. Gould
New York State Senate
Preceded by George T. Pierce	New York State Senate; 10th District; 1854–1855	Succeeded by George S. Nichols
