= Joshua Fiero Jr. =

American politician

Joshua Fiero Jr. (May 4, 1818 - March 1, 1886) was an American merchant and politician from New York.

== Life ==
He was the son of Conrad Fiero and Catherine Fiero. He was born in that part of the Town of Broome which was separated in 1836 to form the Town of Conesville, in Schoharie County, New York. At age 9, he went to Saugerties, Ulster County, New York, to live with his uncle Joshua Fiero who adopted him. In 1840, Joshua Jr. became a clerk in a dry-goods store in Catskill, Greene County, New York, and a few years later opened his own store there. On July 28, 1842, he married Mary Frances Pierson (1820–1907), and they had several children, among them State Senator William P. Fiero (1843–1912).

He was a member of the New York State Assembly (Greene Co., 1st D.) in 1854; and a member of the New York State Senate (10th D.) in 1860 and 1861.

He died at his home in Catskill, and was buried at the Village Cemetery there.

== Sources ==
- The New York Civil List compiled by Franklin Benjamin Hough, Stephen C. Hutchins and Edgar Albert Werner (1867; pg. 442 and 477)
- Biographical Sketches of the State Officers and Members of the Legislature of the State of New York by William D. Murphy (1861; pg. 51ff)
- OBITUARY; EX-SENATOR FIERO in NYT on
- Catskill Cemetery records at RootsWeb

New York State Assembly
| Preceded by Darius Winans | New York State Assembly; Greene County, 1st District; 1854 | Succeeded by Martin L. Rickerson |
New York State Senate
| Preceded by George W. Pratt | New York State Senate; 10th District; 1860–1861 | Succeeded by Jacob S. Freer |
