= Zadock Pratt =

American politician (1790-1871)

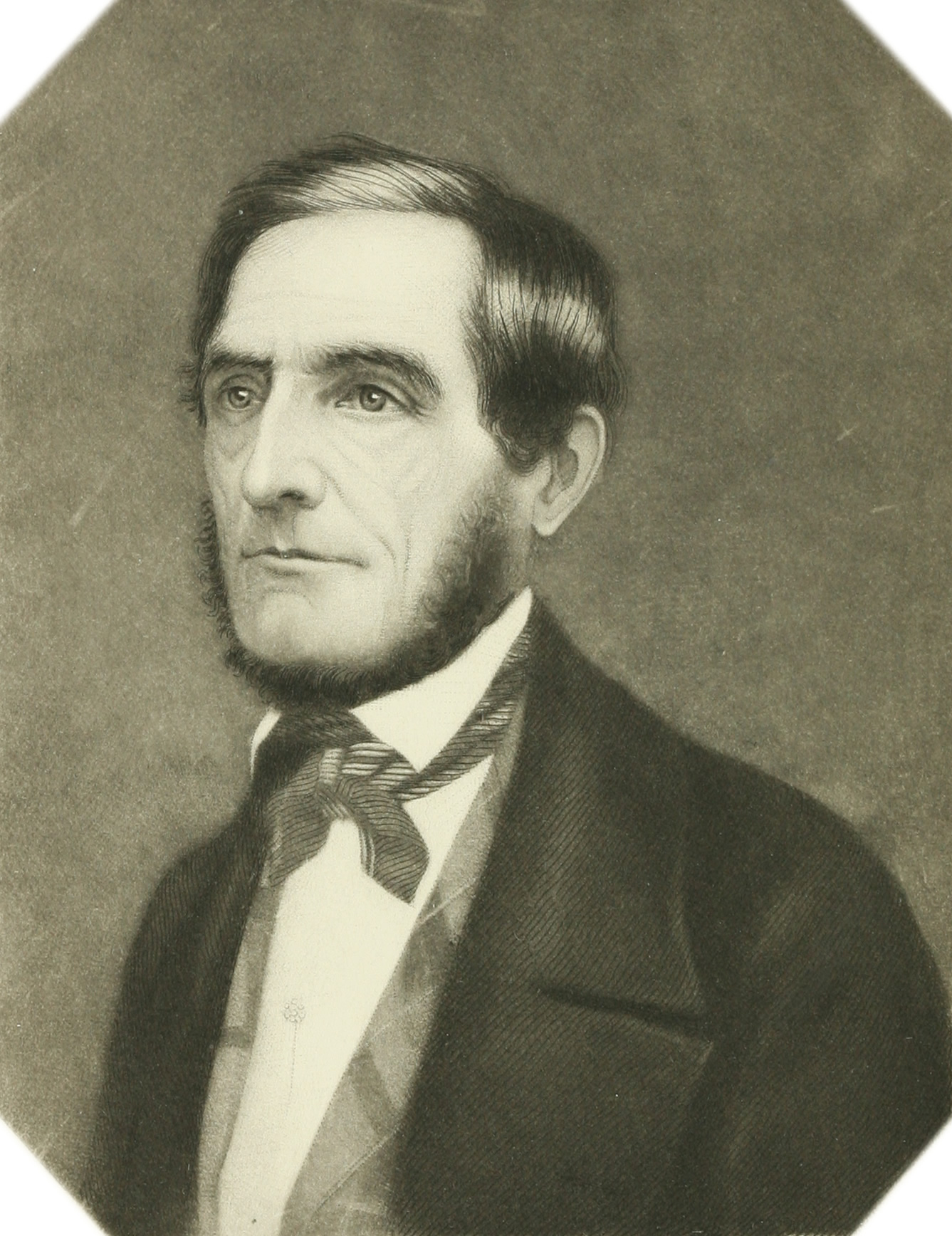

Member of the U.S. House of Representatives from New York
- In office March 4, 1837 – March 3, 1839
- Preceded by: Aaron Vanderpoel
- Succeeded by: Archibald L. Linn
- Constituency: 8th district
- In office March 4, 1843 – March 3, 1845
- Preceded by: Aaron Vanderpoel
- Succeeded by: John F. Collin
- Constituency: 11th district

Member of the New York Senate

Personal details
- Born: Zadock Pratt Jr. October 30, 1790 Stephentown, New York
- Died: April 6, 1871 (aged 80) Jersey City, New Jersey
- Resting place: Prattsville, New York; 42°19′14″N 74°26′7″W
- Party: Democratic
- Spouse(s): Beda Dickerman (m. 1818, d. 1819); Esther Dickerman (m. 1823, d. 1824); Abigail P. Watson (m. 1827, d. 1834); Mary Watson (m. 1835, d. 1868); Susie A. Grimm (m. 1869)
- Children: George Watson Pratt; Julia Harriet Pratt; Abigail Watson Pratt
- Occupation: Tanner, Banker, soldier

Military service
- Allegiance: United States
- Years of service: 1814–1815, 1819–1826
- Rank: Captain 1820–1822; Colonel 1822–1826
- Commands: 5th Regiment New York State Artillery; 116th Regiment New York Militia
- Battles/wars: War of 1812

Zadock Pratt Jr. (October 30, 1790 – April 5, 1871) was a tanner, banker, soldier, and member of the United States House of Representatives for two non-consecutive terms in the mid-19th century.

Pratt served in the New York militia from 1819 to 1826, and was Colonel of the 116th regiment from 1822 until his resignation from the militia on September 4, 1826.

Pratt financed multiple smaller tanneries in the Catskills, and also one in Pennsylvania as a joint venture with Jay Gould.

== Early life and family ==
Zadock Pratt was born on October 30, 1790, in Stephentown, New York, to Hannah Pratt (née Pickett) and Zadock Pratt Sr. He was the 5th of 7 children. In 1797, Pratt moved with his father's family to Middleburgh, New York. In 1802, at age 12, Pratt moved with his parents to Windham, New York (which soon became Lexington, and is current day Jewett). As a child, he received limited schooling at the public school, and instead worked on his father's farm and tannery. In his father's yard there were "two limes" and eight vats, and the bark was ground with a circular millstone by horse power.

In 1810, at age 20, Pratt became an apprentice to Luther Hayes, a sadler in Durham. Following his apprenticeship, he became a traveling saddler for a year, during which he saved $100. In 1812, he returned to Lexington where he continued his work as a saddler, working fourteen-hour days. In 1814, Pratt built a general store in Prattsville where he would barter with residents for goods, and would make periodic trips to New York City to trade the goods.

=== War of 1812 ===
Pratt volunteered for the War of 1812 in 1814. He was a Steward of a company stationed at Brooklyn Heights. He was awarded $11 for his claim of arms and clothing which were destroyed during the war. In 1857, he would receive a warrant of 160 acres (0.65 km^{2}) of land for his service. In 1815, after war ended, he returned to Lexington, sold his store. On May 7, 1817, he entered the tanning business with his older brother (Ezra) and his younger brother (Bennett).

=== Marriage and early business activities ===
On October 18, 1818, Pratt married Beda Dickerman of Hamden, Connecticut, who died of tuberculosis six months later on April 19, 1819. Pratt and his brother Ezra then bought out Bennett's share of the tanning business for $2200.

Wealth makes the man,—and want of it, the fellow.

— Zadock Pratt

In 1821, Pratt was appointed a magistrate of Lexington. In 1823, Pratt married Esther Dickerman, sister of his first wife. Esther died less than a year later on April 22, 1824, also of tuberculosis.

=== Pratt's tannery ===
Pratt had been planning a tanning business much larger than what he was currently engaged in, and Esther's death put him into action. He dissolved his partnership with his brother, and, with $14000 in capital, began seeking a location for his new tannery. He spent the summer of 1824 exploring the surrounding counties with his dog for the best place for his planned operations. He decided on a region in the very western part of Windham, in what is current day Prattsville, for its large forests of hemlock, which was necessary for tanning at the time, as well as its proximity to the Schoharie Creek. The Prattsville Commercial Building, built about 1824, listed on the National Register of Historic Places in 1996.

On October 24, he moved all of his belongings to the site and purchased the large meadow for $1300. The following day he broke ground on the tannery, and with the help of laborers, dammed the creek in the following weeks.

The tannery was 550' long, and 43' wide. There were 350 vats, 6 heaters, 12 leaches, two bark mills driven by a great wheel, and three hide mills.

Tannery foreman Osmer B. Wheeler later went on to open his own tannery, in Forestburgh, New York, and became a member of the New York State Senate.

=== Military and remarriages ===
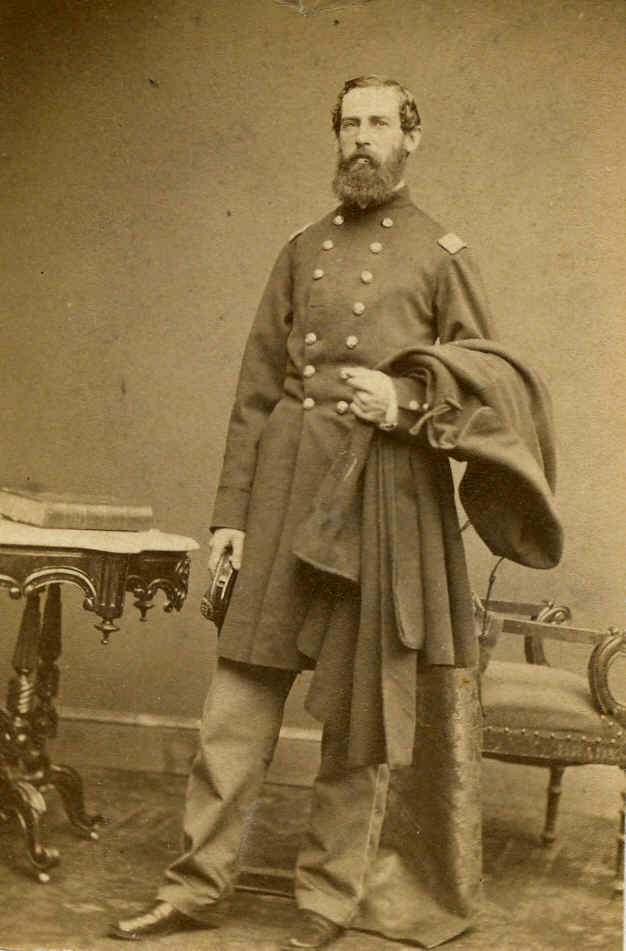
Zadock Pratt's first son, George, died of wounds suffered in the Second Battle of Bull Run.

On April 25, 1820, Pratt was chosen as Captain of the Fifth regiment of New York State Artillery, which consisted of 130 men. Acquired a cannon that had been used at the Battle of Plattsburgh for the regiment. On July 12, 1822, he became a Colonel for New York's 116th Infantry. In 1825, he commanded the escort of Lafayette into Catskill.

On October 12, 1827, Pratt married his third wife, Abigail P. Watson, of Rensselaer. Their son was State Senator George W. Pratt (1830–1862).

On November 20, 1832, he applied to the State Legislature to divide Windham, and on March 8, 1833, Prattsville was divided off from Windham. At the time it had a population of around 1500.

On January 26, 1834, Pratt's second daughter, Abigail, was born. Pratt's wife died 10 days later on February 5, aged 26. On March 16, 1835, Pratt married his fourth wife, Mary E. Watson, sister of his third wife. Mary Pratt died in Providence, New York on July 17, 1868.

In 1836, he was elected to New York's 8th District, and in the same election, was voted to be and elector for New York.

In 1839, Westkill Lexington tannery burned down. He lost $10,000 but was only insured for $7,000.

Pratt offered to endow Prattsville Academy with $5,000 if the sum were matched by a Christian church.

In 1842, he was elected to New York's 11th District. That same year, he established the Prattsville Advocate newspaper. J. L. Hackstaff was the editor. In the same year, the Prattsville Academy was built. The land was donated by Pratt, and he provided half of the building costs.

In 1848, he received an honorary Master of the Arts degree from Union College. In 1852, he was elected as a delegate to the 1852 Democratic Convention.

== Prattsville and his Tannery ==
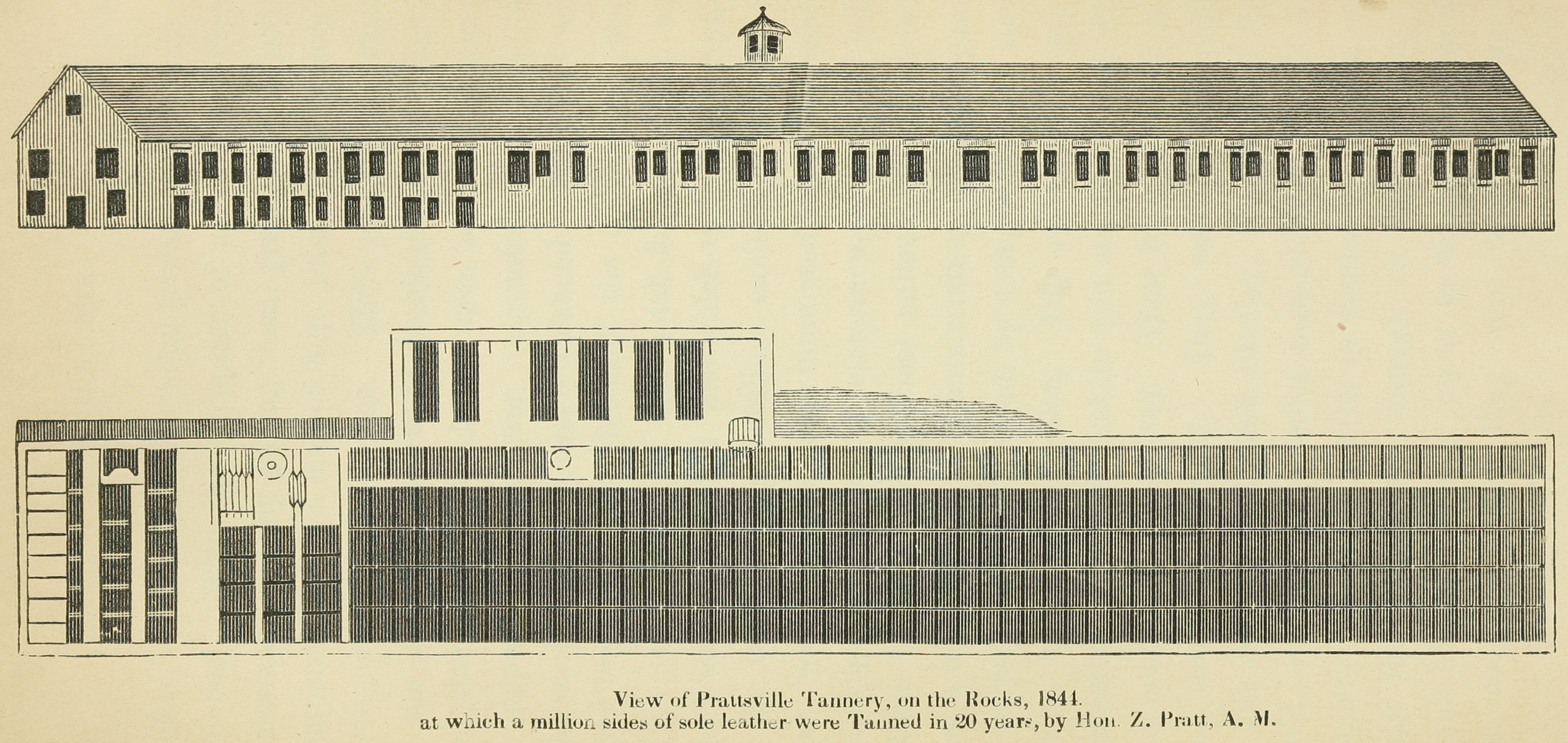
A drawing of Pratt's tannery from 1844.

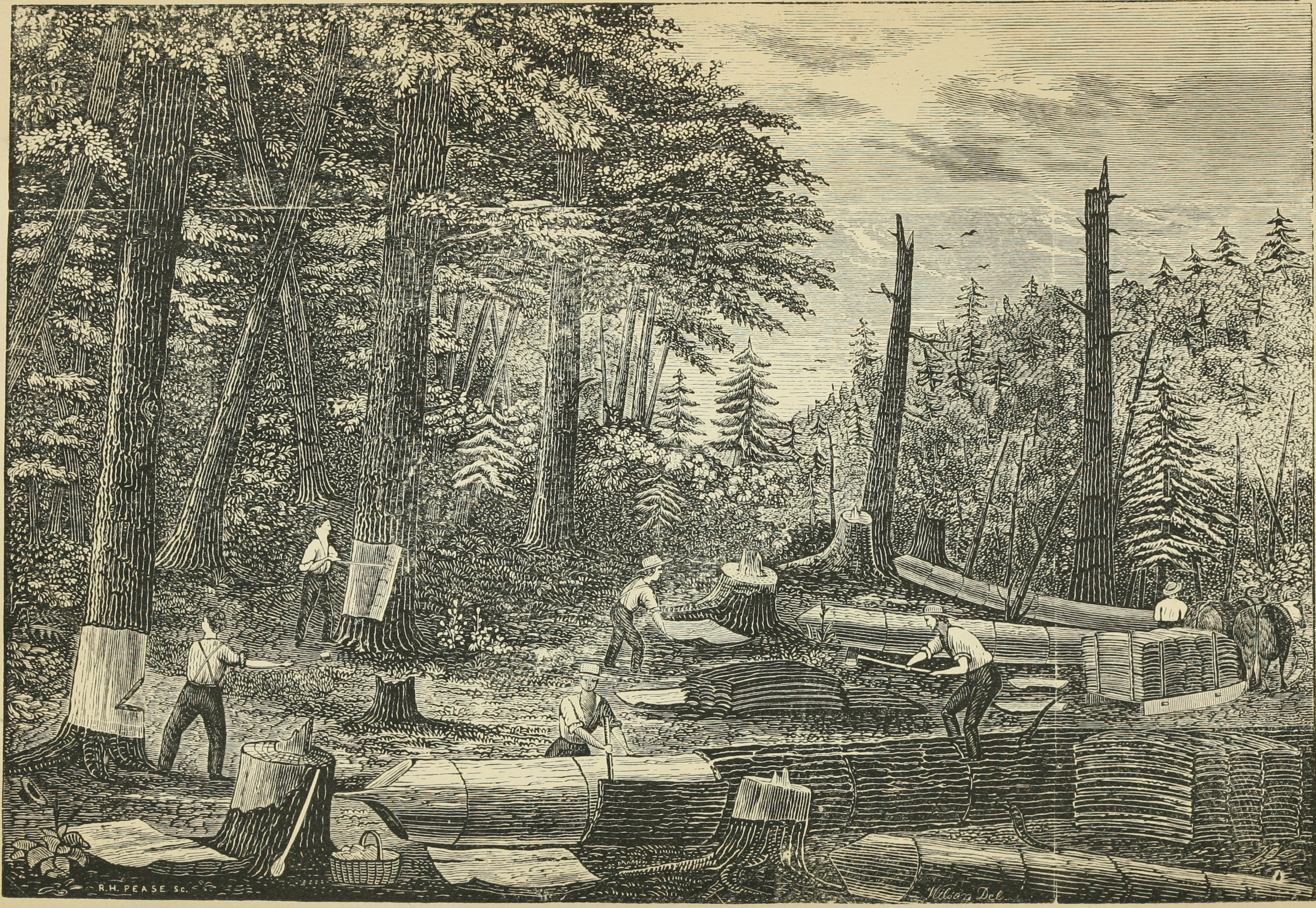
Workers peeling hemlock bark for the tannery in Prattsville.

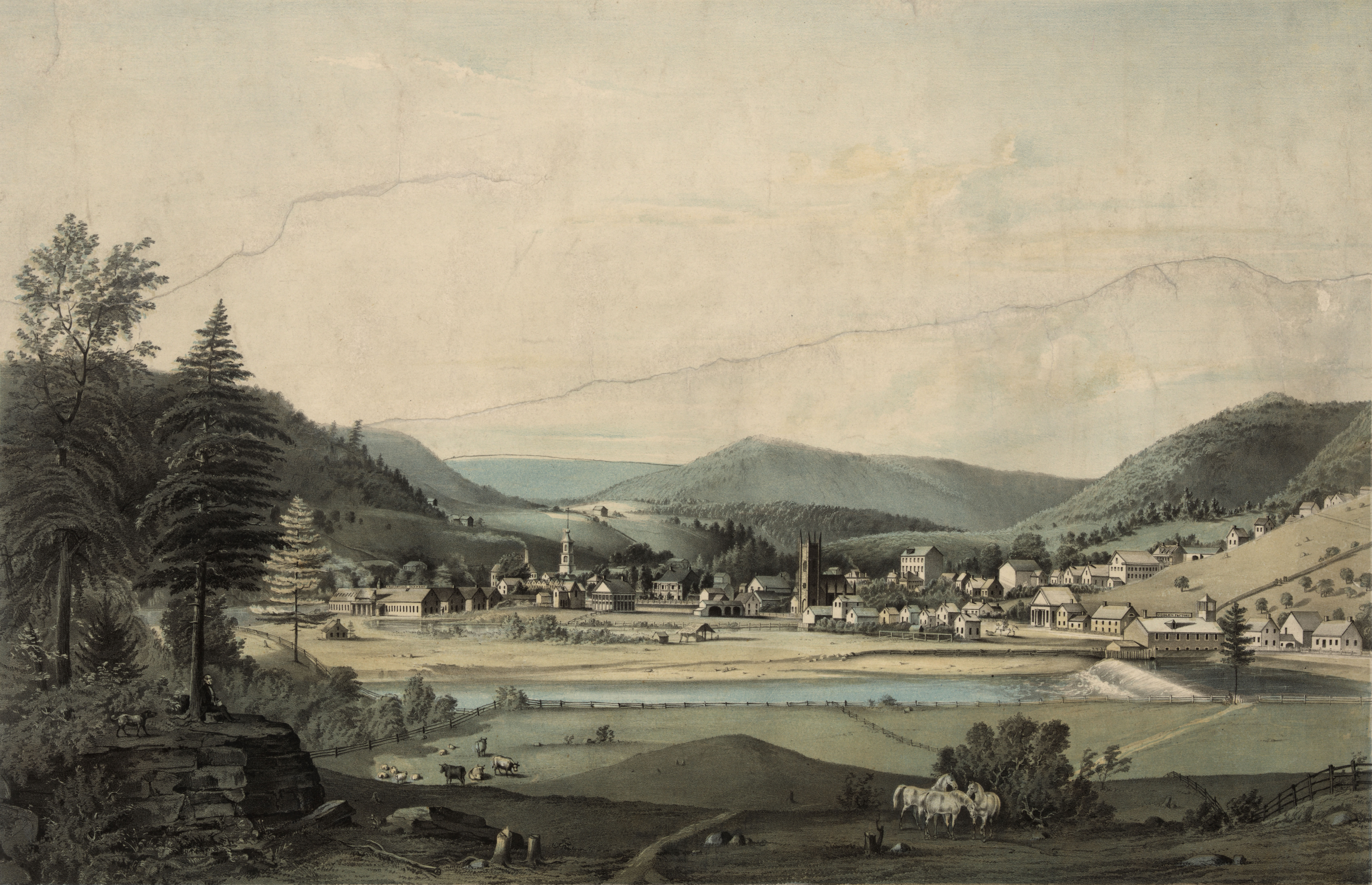
An 1844 drawing of Prattsville.

== First term as Congressman ==
In 1836, Pratt earned the Democratic nomination for New York's 8th congressional district. He won general election by just short of 3,000 votes. On September 10, 1837 Pratt was appointed to the Committee of the Militia, and on December 11, was appointed to the committee on public buildings.

On March 19, 1838, Pratt introduced a bill to drastically lower postage rates, and argued that high postage costs disproportionately affected the poor, and that it was effectively a tax on intelligence, as it hindered the free passage of information. The bill was passed. He felt so strongly about the price of postage that on his grave he had inscribed "WHILE MEMBER OF CONGRESS; MOVED THE REDUCTION OF POSTAGE; A.D. 1838".

On February 25, 1839, Pratt suggested that public buildings no longer be built out of sandstone, but instead granite of marble, because they absorb very little water compared to sandstone, and therefore required less maintenance He also noted that marble was cheaper than granite, when including building costs.

On July 4, 1838, he announced that he declined re-election, although his constituents strongly wanted him to serve another term.

March 18, 1839, Dry Dock in Brooklyn vs. Philadelphia.

Mint in New York vs. Philadelphia.

During his first term, Pratt never missed a session.

== Second term as Congressman ==
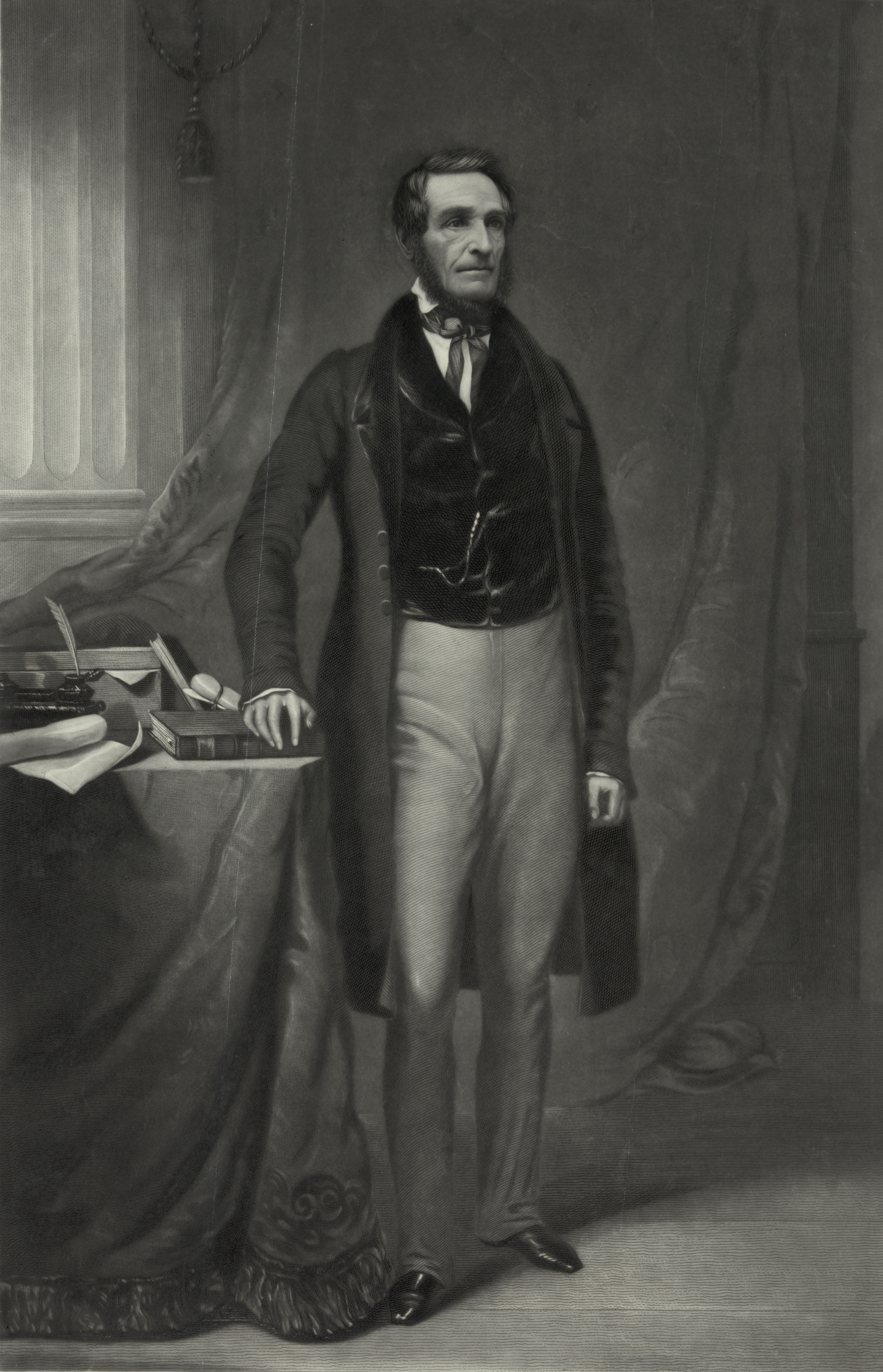
A full-length portrait of Pratt that was engraved on steel in 1845.

Pratt did not intend to run for Congress again after declining to run for re-election following his first term as Congressman. However, in 1842 he accepted the nomination.

== Legacy as a Congressman ==
The business of life is to be useful.

— Zadock Pratt

As a congressman, Pratt pushed for legislation.

- Reduce the cost of postage from $.25 to $.05 in 1838.
- Create the Bureau of Engraving and Printing.
- Construct public buildings in Washington, DC, of marble or granite, not sandstone.
- Construct the Dry Dock in Brooklyn.
- Initiate first survey for the Transcontinental Railroad 1844.
- While in Congress he began a movement to complete the Washington Monument, and he also started a practice of hanging the Presidential Portraits in the Rotunda.

The epitaph on Pratt's gravestone reads:

WHILE MEMBER OF CONGRESS
MOVED THE REDUCTION OF POSTAGE
A.D. 1838
AND THE SURVEY FOR A RAILROAD
TO THE PACIFIC A.D. 1844

member of the State Senate in 1830; elected as a Democrat to the Twenty-fifth Congress (March 4, 1837 – March 3, 1839); elected to the twenty-eighth Congress (March 4, 1843 – March 3, 1845); chairman, Committee on Public Buildings and Grounds (twenty-eighth Congress).

== Marriages and children ==
Pratt married five times.

His first wife was Beda Dickerman, whom he married in 1818. She died of tuberculosis seven months later.

In 1821 Pratt married his first wife's sister, Esther Dickerman. Esther died two and a half years later, also from tuberculosis.

Pratt married his third wife, Abigail P. Watson of Rensselaerville, on January 12, 1829. Pratt had his only children with Abigail:

- George Watson Pratt, born April 18, 1830
- Julia P. Pratt, born in 1832
- Abigail Watson Pratt, born on January 26, 1834

On February 5, 1834, Abigail, Pratt's third wife, died at twenty-eight years old due to complications from the birth of her daughter, who also died shortly thereafter at age 3 months.

Some time later, Pratt married Abigail's sister Mary. They were married until July 17, 1868 when Mary died of unknown causes.

One year later Pratt married his fifth wife, Susie A. Grimms of Brooklyn, October 16, 1869. They were married in Grace Episcopal Church, Prattsville; Zadock had given the land and half the money to build the church. They remained married until Zadock's death.

== Later life ==
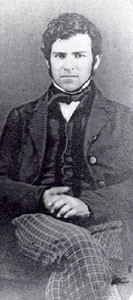
Jay Gould in 1855, one year before he met Pratt.

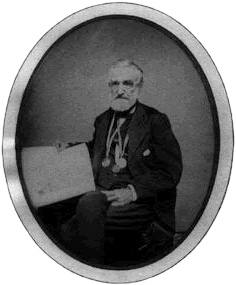
An undated photo of an aged Zadock Pratt.

In 1856, Zadock Pratt, at 66 years old, met a teenage Jay Gould, and hired him to survey a tanning site in Pennsylvania. Gould found large tracts of hemlock forest for sale, which impressed Pratt, who then made Gould a partner and manager of the new tannery. By another account, Gould decided that he wanted to build a tannery, found a site, and then sought out Pratt's assistance.

There was $120,000 capital for the project, all of which came from Pratt. He left the tannery to Gould, which expanded rapidly, and the surrounding settlement was called Gouldsboro (also spelled Gouldsborough). However, Pratt became dissatisfied with the returns on his investment, and was concerned that Gould was embezzling. Gould had become acquainted with Charles M. Leupp, a rich merchant from New York City, and had convinced Leupp to loan him the money to buy out Pratt's share. Gould offered Pratt $60,000 for his share of the tannery, which Pratt accepted, transferring Pratt's stake to Leupp.

In 1861, Pratt donated to Prattsville the 20 acres (8.1 ha) where Pratt Rock now is.

=== Death ===
Pratt became ill with a fever while he and his wife were visiting relatives in Bergen, New Jersey, which had recently been annexed by Jersey City. While recovering he fell down stairs and broke one of his femurs. He died due to the injury on April 6, 1871. He is buried in the City Cemetery in Prattsville. Pratt Rock depicts his life through a series of stone carvings. His former home at Prattsville, the Zadock Pratt House, was listed on the National Register of Historic Places in 1986, and has operated as a house museum since 1959.

== Notes ==
U.S. House of Representatives
Preceded by Aaron Vanderpoel	Member of the U.S. House of Representatives from New York's 8th congressional district March 4, 1837 – March 3, 1939	Succeeded by Aaron Vanderpoel
Preceded by Archibald L. Linn	Member of the U.S. House of Representatives from New York's 11th congressional district March 4, 1843 – March 3, 1945	Succeeded by Aaron Vanderpoel
