= John and Martinus Laraway Inn =

Historic inn in New York, United States

- U.S. National Register of Historic Places
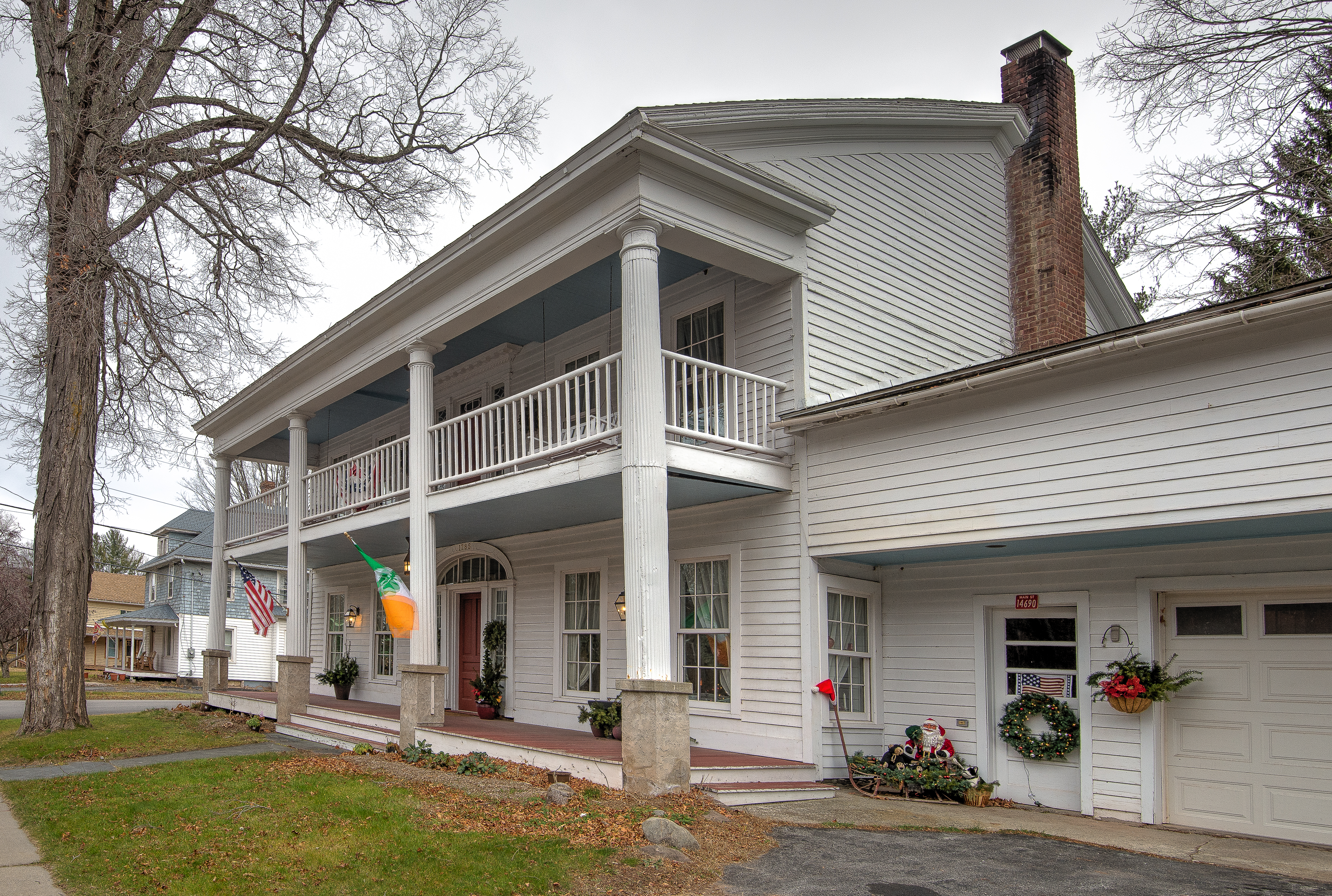
- John and Martinus Laraway Inn, December 2015

- Location within New York Location within the United States
- Location: Main St, Prattsville, New York
- Coordinates: 42°19′07″N 74°26′08″W
- Area: Less than 1 acre (0.40 ha)
- Built: c. 1785, c. 1830
- Architectural style: Federal, Greek Revival
- NRHP reference No.: 12000419
- Added to NRHP: July 17, 2012

John and Martinus Laraway Inn, also known as the O'Hara Home, is a historic home located at Prattsville, Greene County, New York. It was built about 1785 and altered about 1830, and is a two-story, five-bay, single pile, Greek Revival style frame dwelling. It features a two-story, full-width front porch with fluted Doric order columns. The building served as a hotel and social hall into the early-20th century.

It was added to the National Register of Historic Places in 2012.
