= Herman D. Gould =

American politician (1799–1852)

Member of the U.S. House of Representatives from New York's 10th district
- In office March 4, 1849 – March 3, 1851
- Preceded by: Eliakim Sherrill
- Succeeded by: Marius Schoonmaker

Personal details
- Born: Herman Day Gould; January 16, 1799 Sharon, Connecticut, U.S.
- Died: January 26, 1852 (aged 53) Delhi, New York, U.S.
- Resting place: Woodland Cemetery
- Party: Whig
- Spouse: Ann Eliza Sherwood
- Children: 4
- Profession: Politician, businessman

Herman Day Gould (January 16, 1799 – January 26, 1852) was a U.S. representative from New York.

== Biography ==
Born in Sharon, Connecticut, Gould pursued an academic course. He engaged in mercantile pursuits in Kingston, and Delhi, New York. He married Ann Eliza Sherwood, the daughter of Samuel Sherwood, and they had four children.

Gould served as president of the Delhi National Bank from 1839 to 1849.

He was an unsuccessful candidate for election in 1840 to the Twenty-seventh Congress and in 1844 to the Twenty-ninth Congress.

Gould was elected as a Whig to the Thirty-first Congress (March 4, 1849 – March 3, 1851). He was not a candidate for renomination in 1850.

Gould resumed business interests in Delhi, New York, and died there January 26, 1852. He was interred in Woodland Cemetery. Gould had served as Vice President of the Woodland Cemetery Association.

U.S. House of Representatives
Preceded by Eliakim Sherrill	Member of the U.S. House of Representatives from New York's 10th congressional district 1849–1851	Succeeded by Marius Schoonmaker
