= 80th New York Infantry Regiment =

- Active: April 23-May 11, 1861 (mustered in) to August 2, 1861 (three months' militia service), then September 20-October 20, 1861 (mustered in) to January 29, 1866
- Country: United States
- Allegiance: Union
- Branch: Infantry
- Nickname(s): Ulster Guard
- Engagements: Second Battle of Bull Run; Battle of Chantilly; Battle of South Mountain; Battle of Antietam; Battle of Fredericksburg; Battle of Gettysburg; Mine Run Campaign; Battle of the Wilderness; Battle of Spotsylvania Court House; Battle of North Anna; Battle of Totopotomoy Creek; Battle of Cold Harbor; Siege of Petersburg

Insignia
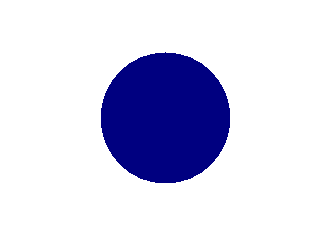
- 3rd Division, I Corps

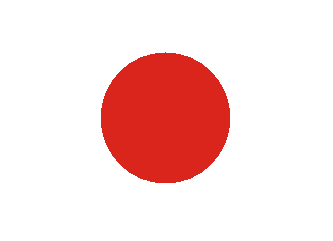
- 1st Division, I Corps

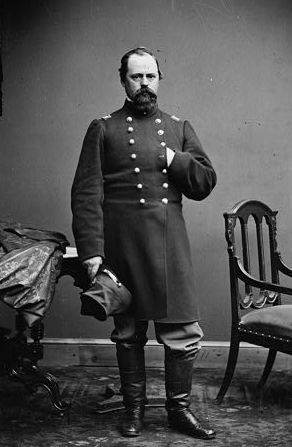
Col, Theodore B. Gates

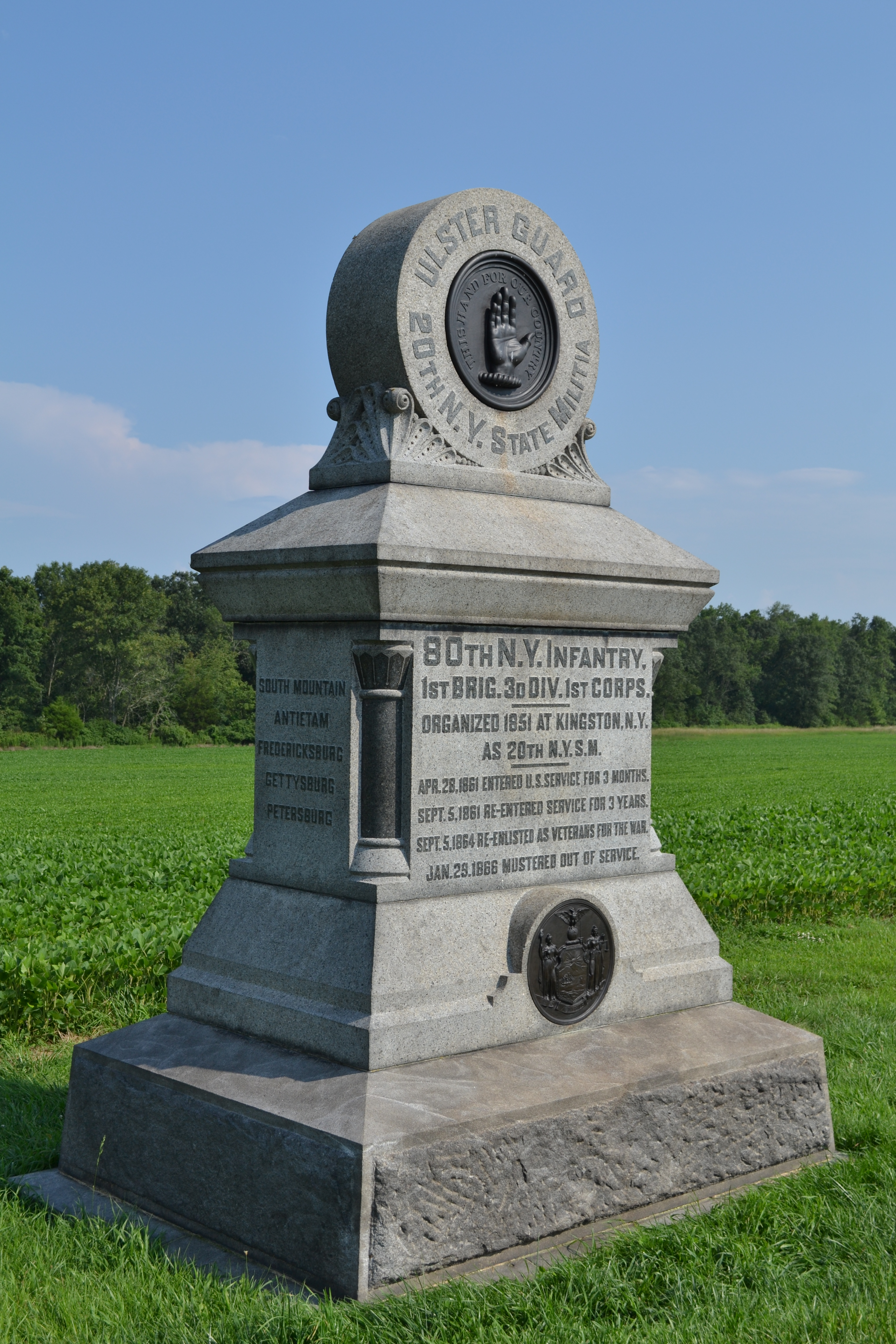
Monument to the 80th New York Volunteer Infantry at Gettysburg

The 80th New York Infantry Regiment, originally designated the 20th New York State Militia Regiment, "Ulster Guard", was an infantry regiment of the Union Army during the American Civil War.

== Service ==
On the return of the 20th New York State Militia Regiment from its three months' service, Col. George W. Pratt reorganized it at Kingston, New York, as a regiment of volunteers, and it was mustered in the service of the United States for three years between September 20 and October 20, 1861. On December 7, 1861, it received its State numerical designation, and on June 5, 1863, the men of the 35th New York Volunteer Infantry Regiment joined the regiment. On November 6, 1864, a new company joined the regiment.

The companies were recruited principally in Ulster County; men from neighboring counties also joined the regiment.

The regiment left the State October 26, 1861; served in Wadsworth's Brigade from October, 1861; in Irvin McDowell's Division, Army of Potomac, from November, 1861; in 2d Brigade, McDowell's Division, Army of Potomac, from January, 1862; in Marsena R. Patrick's, 1st, Brigade, King's, 3d, Division, 1st Corps, Army of Potomac, from March, 1862; in 2d Brigade, same division, Department of the Rappahannock, from May, 1862; in 3d Brigade, 1st Division, 3d Corps, Army of Virginia, from June, 1862; in same brigade and division, 1st Corps, Army of Potomac, from September 12, 1862; in Patrick's Provost Guard Brigade, Army of Potomac, from January 7, 1863; in 1st Brigade, 3d Division, 1st Corps, Army of Potomac, from June, 1863; in Provost Guard Brigade, Army of Potomac, from July 16, 1863; in the Independent Brigade, 9th Corps, Army of Potomac, from March, 1865; on provost duty at City Point, Virginia, from April 7, 1865; at Richmond, Virginia, from April 22, 1865; at Norfolk, Virginia, from November 27, 1865; and it was honorably discharged and mustered out, under Col. Jacob B. Hardenbergh, January 29, 1866, at Portsmouth, Virginia.

The regiment left for Washington, D.C., and performed picket duty along the Potomac in the vicinity of Upton's Hill, during the first winter. It fought in Gen. John Pope's Virginia campaign. At the second Bull Run the 80th lost 279 in killed, wounded and missing, and Col. Pratt died a few weeks later of the wounds received in that battle. It was active at South mountain and Antietam, encamped at Sharpsburg for one week and marched through Crampton's Gap, Leesburg, Warrenton and Stafford Court House to Fredericksburg, where it participated in the battle. Winter quarters were established soon after near Hall's Landing and occupied until Jan 7, 1863, when the 80th was assigned, to the provost guard brigade, with headquarters at Brooks' Station and remained on duty at army headquarters until after the battle of Chancellorsville. In July, 1863, the regiment was closely engaged at Gettysburg, where it lost 170 killed, wounded or missing out of 287 engaged. It suffered most severely in the repulse of George Pickett's charge on the last day. After the battle of Gettysburg, the 80th was again ordered to headquarters for provost guard duty and continued in this service until the end of the siege of Petersburg, when it shared in the final assault, April 2, 1865. From April 22 to November 27, 1865, it was stationed at Richmond and then ordered to Norfolk, where it remained until mustered out on January 29, 1866. The regiment early became known for its fine fighting qualities and sustained a reputation for courage and steadiness under fire throughput its long term of service, which lasted, including its militia service, from the spring of 1861 to Jan., 1866. The regiment is classed among the "three hundred fighting regiments," which includes every regiment in the Union Armies which lost over 130 in killed and died of wounds and were considered among the most gallant fighting forces during the Civil War.

== Total strength and casualties ==
The total enrollment of the regiment was 2,103, of whom 128 died of wounds and 156 from accident, imprisonment or disease. During its service the regiment lost by death, killed in action, 5 officers, 81 enlisted men; of wounds received in action, 3 officers, 39 enlisted men; of disease and other causes, 156 enlisted men; total, 8 officers', 276 enlisted, men; aggregate, 284; of whom 22 enlisted men died in the hands of the enemy; by the explosion of ammunition at City Point, Virginia, August 9, 1864, the regiment lost, by death, 6 enlisted men.

== Commanders ==
- Colonel Jacob B. Hartenberg
- Colonel George W. Pratt
- Colonel Theodore B. Gates

== See also ==
- List of New York Civil War regiments
