= Sackets Harbor and Ellisburg Railroad =

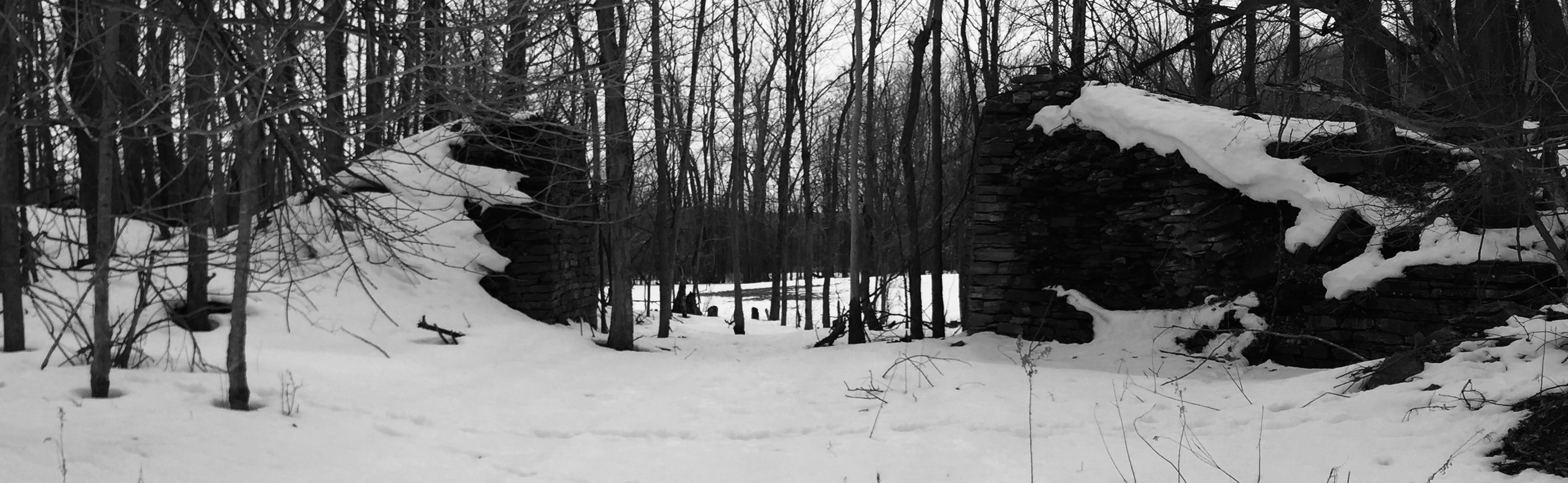
Remains of a railroad bridge near Bedford Creek in Hounsfield, New York (March 2015)

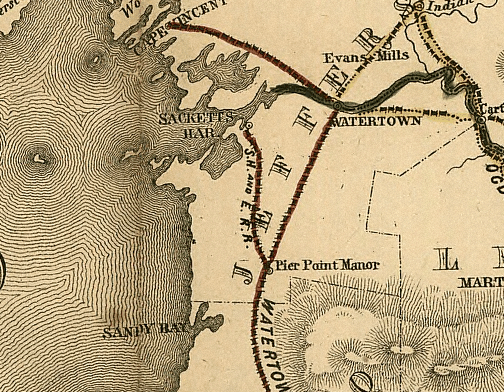
Jan 1855 map of the state of New York showing its water and rail road lines, by direction of John T. Clark State Engineer & Surveyor

Sackets Harbor & Ellisburgh Railroad was incorporated on April 19, 1850, and opened on June 1, 1853 (173 years ago).

On March 30, 1860, it was re-organized into Sackets Harbor, Rome & New York Railroad before ceasing operation in 1862 (164 years ago). Its route took it from Sackets Harbor through Smithville, Henderson, and Belleville, joining the Rome, Watertown and Ogdensburg Railroad at Pierrepont Manor.
