= Van Loon =

Van Loon (Dutch pronunciation: [vɑn ˈloːn]) is a Dutch language toponymic surname.

Loon, an Old Dutch dative plural of Lo meaning 'near/in the woods', is part of the name of multiple towns (e.g. Borgloon and Loon op Zand) and two medieval counties in the Low Countries.

Notable people with the surname include:

- Van Loon (family), Dutch noble family
- Agnes van Loon (1150–1191), duchess consort of Bavaria
- Annewies van Loon (1793–1877), Dutch art collector better known as Annewies van Winter
- Antonius van Loon (1888–1962), Dutch tug of war competitor
- Borin Van Loon (born 1976), British illustrator
- Emmo van Loon (died 1078 AD), count of the County of Loon
- Gerardus van Loon, an alternate name for Olympic sport shooter Dirk Boest Gips
- Giselbert van Loon (c. 980 – c. 1045), count of the County of Loon
- Hendrik Willem van Loon (1882–1944), Dutch-American historian and journalist
  - Van Loon's Lives, his 1942 book
- Johan van Loon (1934–2020), Dutch ceramist and textile artist
- Jordy van Loon (born 1993), Dutch child singer
- Jorn Van Loon (born 1994), Belgian para-cyclist
- Julienne van Loon (born 1970), Australian writer
- Larry Van Loon, member of The Shaun Murphy Band
- Lawrence Gwyn van Loon (1903–1985), American general practitioner, historical linguist and forger
- Louise Van Loon (1905–1987), American wife of Reginald Sheffield
- Maria van Loon-Heinsberg (1424–1502), countess consort
- Martine van Loon (born 1972), Dutch singer
- Peeter van Loon (ca. 1600–1660), Flemish painter
- Patrick van Loon (born 1974), Dutch judoka
- Paul van Loon (born 1955), Dutch children's author and singer
- Richard J. Van Loon (born 1940), Canadian academic and civil servant
- Theodoor van Loon (1581 or 1582–1649), Flemish Baroque painter
- Ton van Loon (born 1956), Dutch general
- Willem van Loon (1891–1975), Dutch tug of war competitor

== See also ==
- Van Loan, a variant spelling
- Albertus Van Loon House, historic building in Athens, New York
- Atlas van Loon, a 17th-century 18-volume atlas by Frederik Willem van Loon
- Dirk Van Loon House, historic home in Pella, Iowa
- Jan Van Loon House, historic building in Athens, New York
- Museum Van Loon, museum in Amsterdam, Netherlands
- Slag Boom Van Loon, musical act and eponymous album featuring Mike Paradinas
- Van Loon Glacier, glacier in Antarctica
- Van Loon Wildlife Area, La Crosse County, Wisconsin
  - Bridge No. 4 (Van Loon Wildlife Area), a bridge on the U.S. National Register of Historic Places
- Van Loon's law, an aphorism attributed to Hendrik Willem van Loon
- Who Killed Van Loon?, a 1948 film noir produced by Hammer Films of England
