= Athens, New York (disambiguation) =

Athens, New York, can refer to:

- Athens (town), New York
- Athens (village), New York

Not to be confused with Athens, Pennsylvania, which is near the New York border and part of the interstate Penn-York Valley.
