= Murderers Creek =

Murderers Creek Mudenaer's Creek, Mudder Creek

Location
- Country: United States
- State: New York
- Region: Hudson Valley
- County: Greene
- Towns: Athens, New York,

Physical characteristics
- Source: Sleepy Hollow Lake
  - location: Athens, New York
  - coordinates: 42°16′51.80″N 73°48′22.40″W
- Mouth: Hudson River at Athens, New York
  - location: Athens, New York
  - coordinates: 42°16′20.00″N 73°48′4.00″W
- Length: 0.68 mi (1.09 km)

Basin features
- River system: Hudson River

Murderers Creek (or Murderer's Creek) is a creek in upstate New York, United States, that flows into the Hudson River in Greene County, New York, just north of the town of Athens. It should not be confused with Moodna Creek, which is in Orange County and is also sometimes called "Murderer's Creek".

== Name ==
The first reference to the name "Murderer's Kill" is from July 18, 1673, in a deed of land to Wyntje Harmense. First governmental reference to the creek is in the New York State Act of March 7, 1788, as "...at the South Bank of the Mouth of the Murderer’s-Kill, at Lunenburgh" (Lunenburgh was the original name of Athens). The name is thought to derive from Middle Dutch, "Mother's Creek", moeder and kille. It may have also been from the Middle Dutch modder meaning "muddy" similar to the river of the same name in Delaware, although the possessive apostrophe indicates otherwise.

In 1813, the body of a young woman named Sally Hamilton was found in the creek about half a mile north of its mouth. Local lore has it that the modern name of the creek originated from this event. Although the name predated the event by 140 years.
