= Athens (village), New York =

Athens, New York
- Village
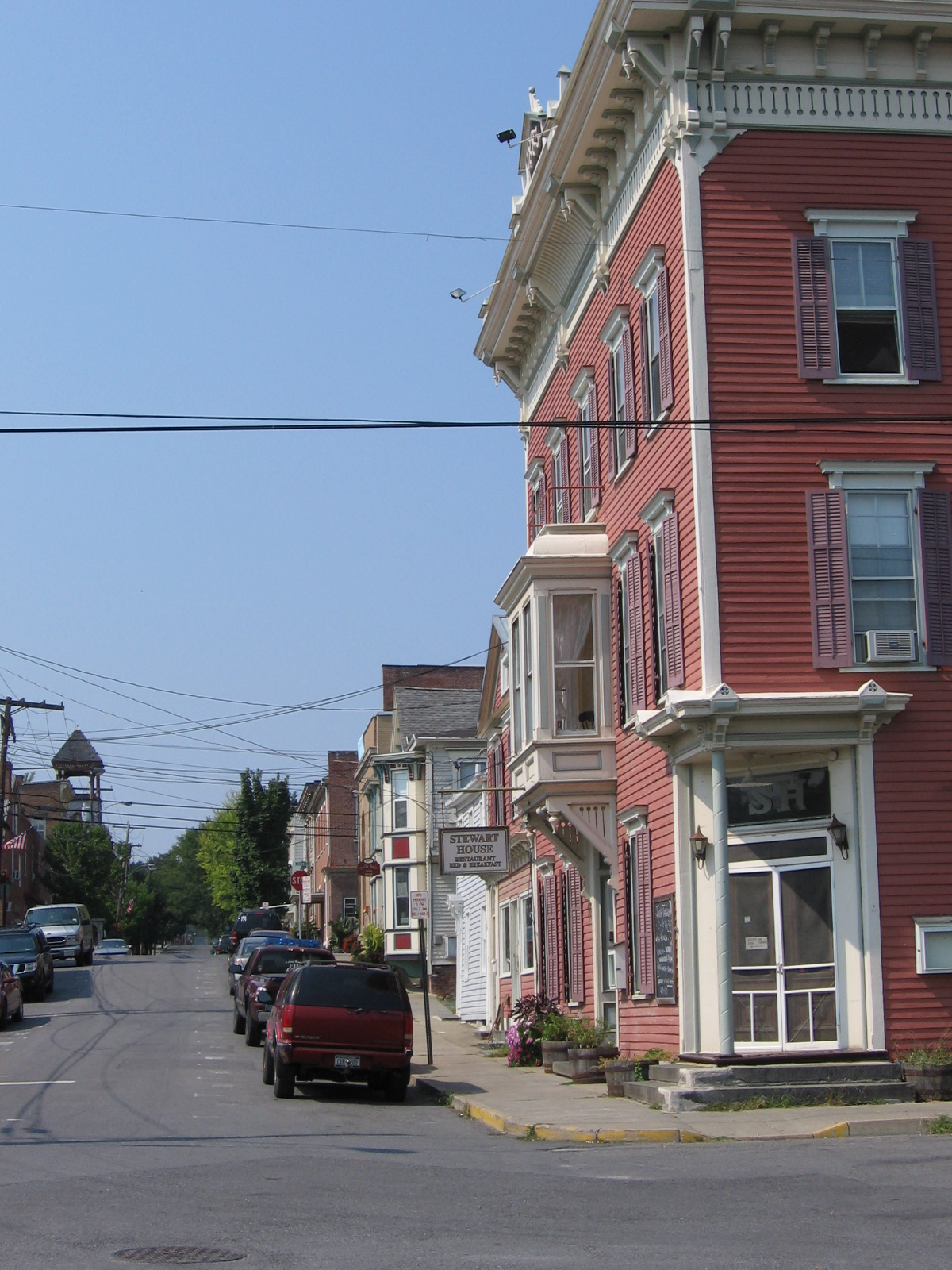
- Village of Athens, Sept. 2007

- Location within New York Location within the United States Location within North America
- Coordinates: 42°16′2″N 73°48′45″W
- Country: United States
- State: New York
- County: Greene
- Town: Athens

Area
  - Total: 4.61 sq mi (11.93 km^{2})
  - Land: 3.42 sq mi (8.86 km^{2})
  - Water: 1.19 sq mi (3.07 km^{2})
- Elevation: 26 ft (8 m)

Population (2020)
  - Total: 1,586
  - Density: 463.8/sq mi (179.07/km^{2})
- Time zone: UTC-5 (Eastern (EST))
  - Summer (DST): UTC-4 (EDT)
- ZIP Code: 12015
- Area code: 518
- FIPS code: 36-02902
- GNIS feature ID: 0942663
- Website: athensvillageny.gov/m

Athens is a village in Greene County, New York, United States, with 1,586 people in the 2020 census. It is named after the classical city of Athens and is the eastern part of the town of Athens, across the Hudson River from the city of Hudson.

== History ==
The history of the village and historic sites worth preservation are detailed in a New York State study, "Village of Athens Multiple Resource Area".

Historic sites in Athens listed on the National Register of Historic Places in or near the village include:

- Athens Lower Village Historic District, roughly bounded by Hudson River, NY 385, Vernon and Market Sts.
  - Jan Van Loon House, built in 1706
- Brick Row Historic District, Off NY 385
- Hudson–Athens Lighthouse, S of Middle Ground Flats in Hudson River
- Stranahan-DelVecchio House, N. Washington St.
- Albertus Van Loon House, N. Washington St.
- West Athens Hill Site, Address Restricted, Athens
- Zion Lutheran Church, N. Washington St.

The land was purchased from the native Mohican people in 1665. The area was once called "Loonenburgh" (alternately, "Lunenburgh"). In the late 18th century, a planned community called "Esperanza" was envisioned by French émigrés north of the current village, but financial troubles doomed the project. The village of Athens began developing at the turn of the 19th century and was incorporated in 1805.

In the late 1830s, Athens had a horse-powered ferry, or "team boat" built for crossing the Hudson. "This was a single hull vessel of the treadmill type requiring six horses for power. The treadmills, on either side, were each trod by three horses always facing in the same direction. To reverse the paddlewheels it was only necessary to stop the horses a minute, and withdraw a drop pin that would reverse the gearing."

The 1935 completion of the Rip Van Winkle Bridge several miles to the south put an end to ferry service across the Hudson, until the summer of 2012 when weekend service resumed. It is anachronistically portrayed in the 2005 film, War of the Worlds, when Martian tripods attack New York City refugees using it to flee across the river.

== Geography ==
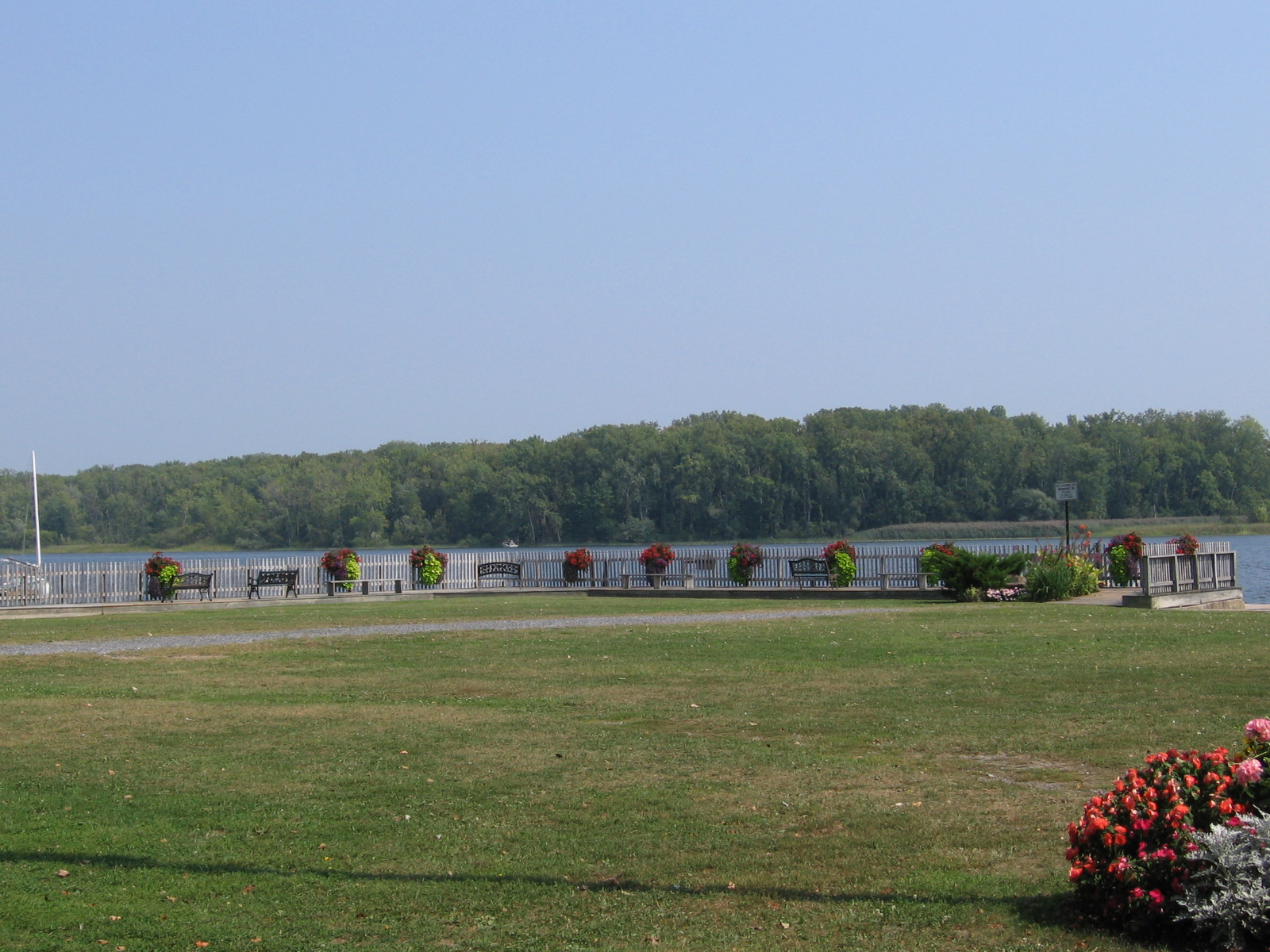
Athens Riverfront Park, September 2007

Athens is located along the eastern edge of Greene County, in the eastern part of the town of Athens, at 42°16′1″N 73°48′44″W (42.267151, −73.812487). The village is situated on the west bank of the Hudson River, and the village limits extend to the center of the river, which in this location is the eastern of two channels. The village contains the portion of Murderers Creek that joins the Hudson River to Sleepy Hollow Lake. Middle Ground Flats, an uninhabited island in the Hudson, is within the village limits. The village is bordered to the east across the Hudson River by Columbia County and the city of Hudson.

New York State Route 385 passes through the village as Washington Street, running roughly parallel to the river. The state highway leads north (upriver) 6 miles (10 km) to Coxsackie and southwest (downriver) 5 miles (8 km) to Catskill.

According to the United States Census Bureau, the village has a total area of 4.6 square miles (11.9 km^{2}), of which 3.4 square miles (8.9 km^{2}) is land and 1.2 square miles (3.1 km^{2}), or 25.73%, is water.

== Demographics ==
Historical population
Census	Pop.	Note	%±
1810	1,000		—
1830	1,000		—
1840	1,300		30.0%
1850	1,400		7.7%
1860	1,747		24.8%
1870	1,793		2.6%
1880	2,106		17.5%
1890	2,024		−3.9%
1900	2,171		7.3%
1910	1,956		−9.9%
1920	1,844		−5.7%
1930	1,618		−12.3%
1940	1,655		2.3%
1950	1,545		−6.6%
1960	1,754		13.5%
1970	1,718		−2.1%
1980	1,738		1.2%
1990	1,708		−1.7%
2000	1,695		−0.8%
2010	1,668		−1.6%
2020	1,586		−4.9%
U.S. Decennial Census

As of the census of 2000, there were 1,695 people, 687 households, and 450 families residing in the village. The population density was 503.0 people per square mile (194.2 people/km^{2}). There were 793 housing units at an average density of 235.3 per square mile (90.8/km^{2}). The racial makeup of the village was 95.46% White, 1.06% Black or African American, 0.24% Native American, 0.71% Asian, 0.12% Pacific Islander, 0.94% from other races, and 1.47% from two or more races. Hispanic or Latino of any race were 1.00% of the population.

There were 687 households, out of which 29.5% had children under the age of 18 living with them, 48.8% were married couples living together, 11.2% had a female householder with no husband present, and 34.4% were non-families. 29.7% of all households were made up of individuals, and 17.5% had someone living alone who was 65 years of age or older. The average household size was 2.44 and the average family size was 3.01.

In the village, the population was spread out, with 24.1% under the age of 18, 6.2% from 18 to 24, 27.6% from 25 to 44, 23.4% from 45 to 64, and 18.6% who were 65 years of age or older. The median age was 41 years. For every 100 females, there were 87.7 males. For every 100 females age 18 and over, there were 85.0 males.

The median income for a household in the village was $36,927, and the median income for a family was $43,636. Males had a median income of $34,125 versus $22,400 for females. The per capita income for the village was $21,282. About 9.2% of families and 10.8% of the population were below the poverty line, including 12.3% of those under age 18 and 11.7% of those age 65 or over.

== Notable person ==
Philip A. Goodwin was a United States Congressman.
