= Stranahan-DelVecchio House =

Historic house in New York, United States

- U.S. National Register of Historic Places
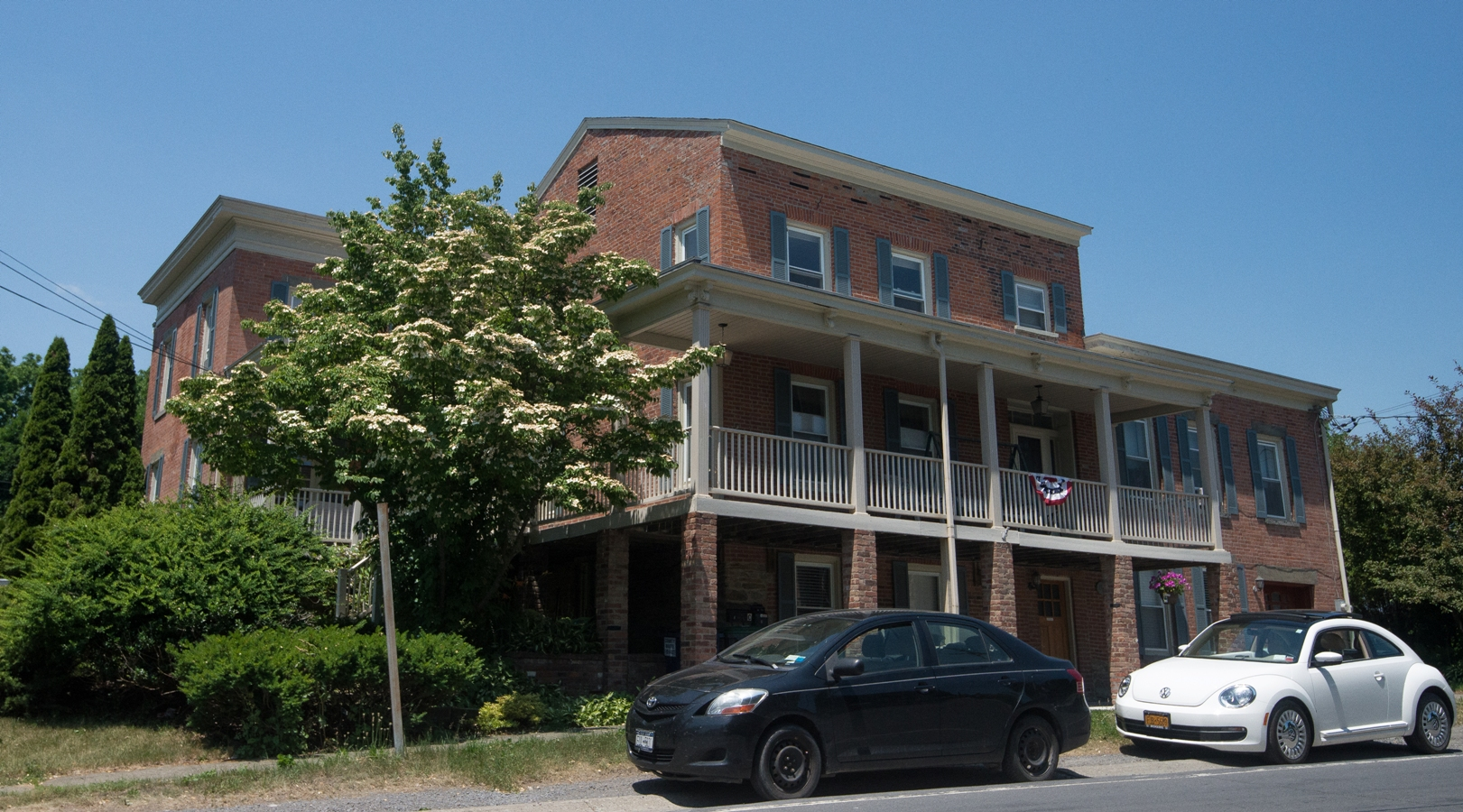

- Location within New York Location within the United States
- Location: N. Washington St., Athens, New York
- Coordinates: 42°16′7″N 73°48′18″W
- Area: less than one acre
- Built: 1852
- Architectural style: Greek Revival
- MPS: Village of Athens MRA
- NRHP reference No.: 80002618
- Added to NRHP: November 28, 1980

Stranahan-DelVecchio House is a historic home located at Athens in Greene County, New York. It was built in 1852 and is a majestic Greek Revival–style structure. It has a 2 1/2-story central block with 2-story symmetrical wings. It features a 3-story portico supported by Ionic columns.

It was listed on the National Register of Historic Places in 1980.
