= Lawrence Gwyn van Loon =

American general practitioner, amateur historical linguist and forger

L.G. Van Loon
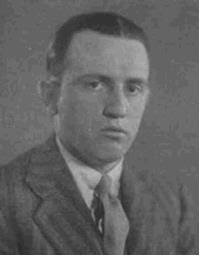
- Van Loon (1931)
- Born: Lawrence Gwyn Van Loon; 1903; New York City
- Died: November 7, 1985 (aged 81–82); Gloversville, New York
- Occupations: physician, linguist, forger

Lawrence Gwyn Van Loon (1903, New York City - 7 November 1985, Gloversville, New York) was an American general practitioner, amateur historical linguist and forger.

== Biography ==
Van Loon was possibly a direct descendant of Jan Van Loon, who had emigrated from Liège to New Netherland in the seventeenth century.

At the age of ten he went to Reading, New York, for a journey to the Mohawk Valley. He allegedly learned the remains of the Mohawk Dutch language, the tawl, from his maternal grandfather, Walter Hill (1856-1925), a schoolteacher. It is higly unlikely that he actually spoke the language, as he only raised his claims of being able to after discovering the language had gone extinct. Van Loon claimed to have found original documents containing the Tawl, but they were proven to be forgery in the 1980's, shortly before his death. Later research also pointed out that his forgeries contained too many errors for him to be a native speaker. Some of his forgery contain traces of Afrikaans, a language directly related to Dutch spoken in current-day South Africa, which Van Loon had visited.

During the summers of 1930 and 1932 he spent an internship at the Wilhelmina Hospital in Amsterdam. In 1932 he married a Dutch woman, Grietje Prins. Between 1955 and 1967 he was medical director on Hawaii.

He was a member of the Holland Society and of the Dutch Settlers Society of Albany. Van Loon was also keeper of the records and translator of the Association of Blauvelt Descendants, descendants of Gerrit Hendrickszen (Blauvelt), who moved from Deventer to New Netherland in 1638.

His lifelong relationship with the Dutch language made him an authority on the old Dutch language spoken on the East Coast of the United States. However, several of his publications seemed to be suspect.

In 1980 it was established that work of Van Loon was based on forged documents. Among his suspect findings is the Tawagonshi treaty, which Van Loon claimed he had received from a native from the Mississauga First Nation in Canada, which allegedly contained the original agreement between the Dutch settlers and the Lenape people. It was proven to be fake, as (among other reasons) the spelling of the native names was in English, whilst the treaty would have used Dutch spelling. Other discoveries by Van Loon that proved to be false before publication were an early deed to Manhattan, a map of Albany from 1701, and a map of the Hudson River.

== Personal life ==
Van Loon married to Grietje Prins in Aalsmeer on 25 August 1932. He retired and moved to Gloversville in 1982, and died there in 1985.

== Publications ==
- Bachman, Van Cleaf, Alice P. Kenney & Lawrence G. Van Loon. 1980. ‘ “Het Poelmeisie”. An introduction to the Hudson Valley Dutch dialect’. New York History 61, 161-185.
- Van Loon, L.G. 1938. Crumbs from an old Dutch closet. The Dutch dialect of Old New York. The Hague: Martinus Nijhoff.
- Van Loon, L.G. 1939. 'Ave atque Vale, Jersey Lag Duits Verdwijnt'. Onze Taaltuin 8, 91-95, 107-119.

== Bibliography ==
- Sijs, Nicolien van der (2009) Cookies, Coleslaw, and Stoops. The influence of Dutch on the North American languages Amsterdam: Amsterdam University Press
