= West Athens Hill Site =

- U.S. National Register of Historic Places
- Nearest city: Athens, New York
- Area: 2.5 acres (1.0 ha)
- NRHP reference No.: 73001194
- Added to NRHP: March 20, 1973

West Athens Hill Site is an archaeological site located at Athens in Greene County, New York.

It was listed on the National Register of Historic Places in 1973.
