= Albertus Van Loon House =

Historic house in New York, United States

- U.S. National Register of Historic Places
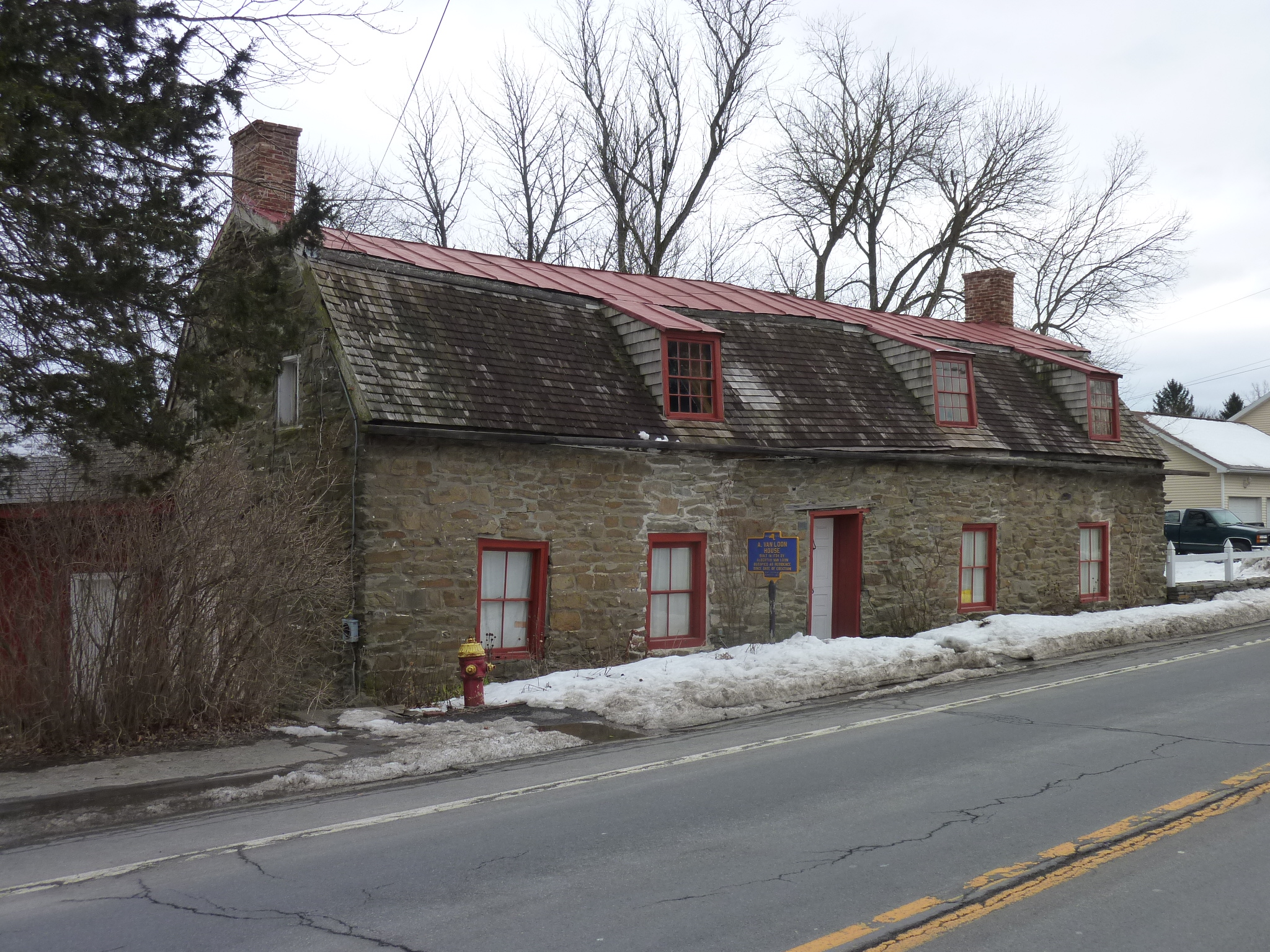

- Location within New York Location within the United States
- Location: 85 North Washington Street, Athens, New York
- Coordinates: 42.266946°N 73.805299°W
- Built: 1724
- Architect: Albertus Van Loon
- Architectural style: Dutch Colonial
- MPS: Village of Athens MRA
- NRHP reference No.: 80002619
- Added to NRHP: 28 November 1980

The Albertus Van Loon House (/væn ˈloʊn/, like van loan) is a 1.5 story native stone home in the village of Athens, New York, United States. Built in 1724 by Albertus Van Loon, one of eight children of Jan Van Loon, it is one of the oldest extant buildings in its part of New York State.

It is located at 85 North Washington Street (also known as New York State Route 385), inside the Village of Athens Multiple Resource Area (MRA).

== History ==
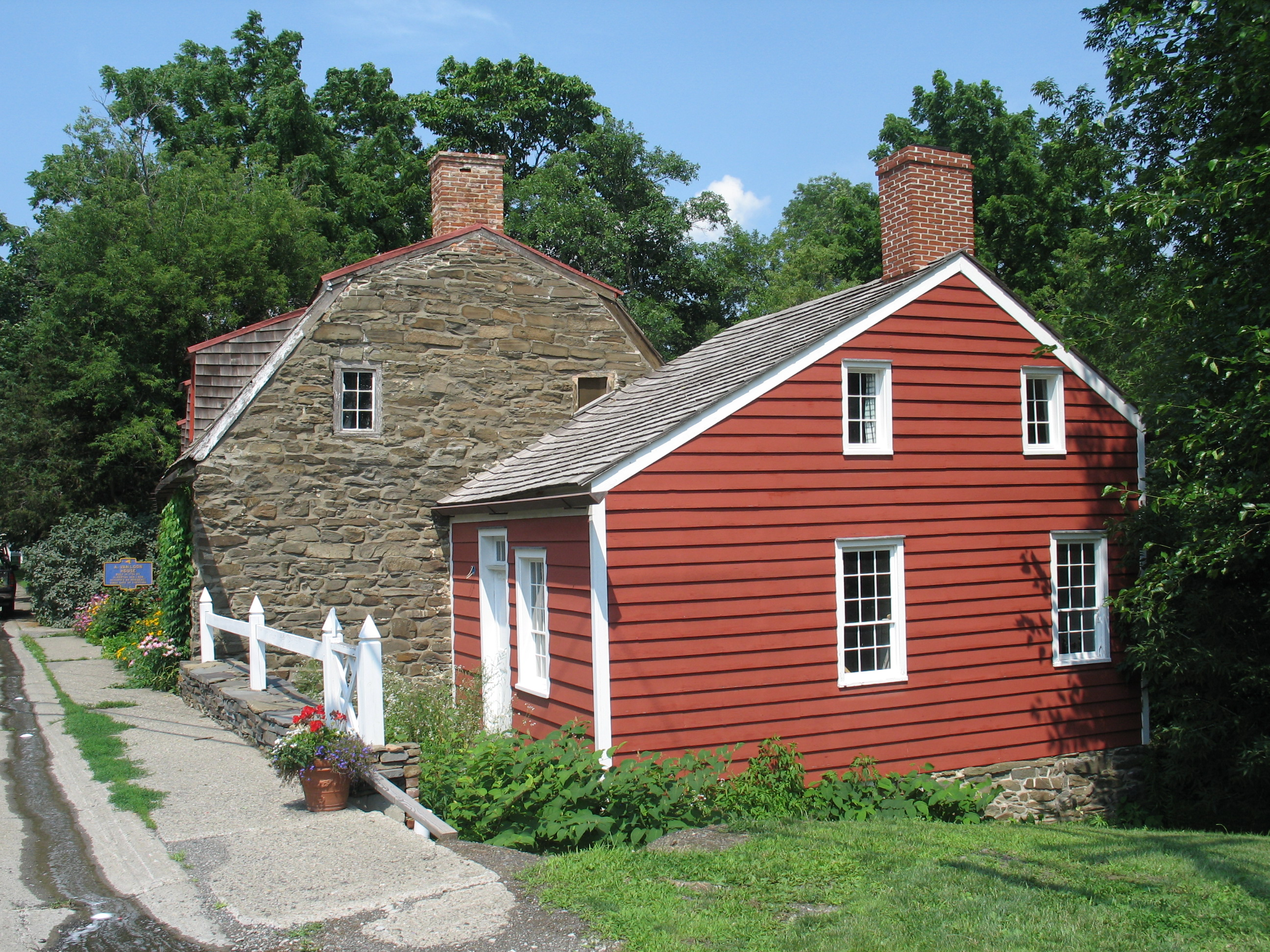
Partial view of the home's gambrel roof

Jan was the earliest European settler to the area, and gave the settlement its first name: Loonenburg. Only one wall of his house remains in the current structure, at 39 South Washington Street.

Albertus was among those who donated land for the town church, today occupied by the Zion Lutheran Church in Athens in 1853. His house is in what was called the Upper Village. The home is an elongated rectangle; a gambrel roof was added between 1775–1800. After Albertus died in 1754, the Van Loon family lived in the house for three generations and moved out in the early 19th century.

== See also ==
- List of the oldest buildings in New York
