= Sleepy Hollow Lake, Greene County, New York =

Sleepy Hollow Lake
- Location within New York Location within the United States

Sleepy Hollow Lake is a recreational lake and residential community (and census-designated place) in Greene County, New York, United States, located 120 miles north of New York City and 28 miles south of Albany in the Hudson River Valley. The lake is a two and one-half mile long, 324 acre, 70 foot deep man-made, Class “A” drinking water reservoir for the neighboring communities. It is surrounded by a 2,200 acre residential community, also known as “Sleepy Hollow Lake”, which is a Planned Unit Development (PUD) that self-governs residential land use, maintains common roads, parks, beaches, and other recreational facilities, operates most of the development's sewer and water services, and provides community security and code enforcement. The community is within the viewshed of the Taconic Mountains to the east and the Catskill Mountains to the west. The community was featured in a 2015 episode of the HGTV series Lakefront Bargain Hunt.

== Lake ==
Sleepy Hollow Lake
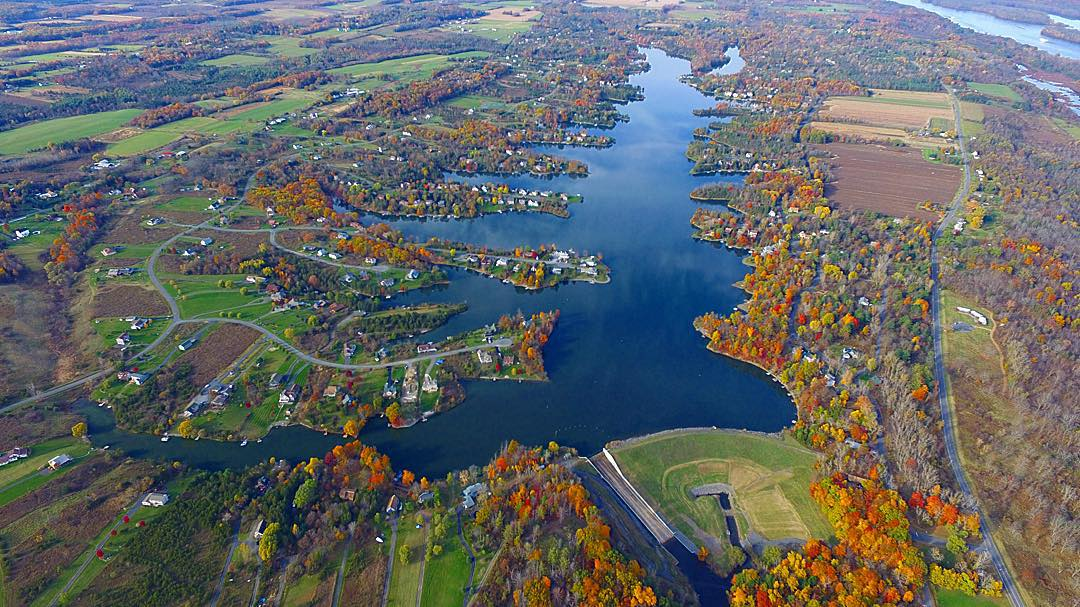
- Sleepy Hollow Lake from Drone

- Location within New York
- Location: Greene County, New York
- Coordinates: 42.294°N 73.807°W
- Type: Reservoir, Man made
- Basin countries: United States
- Max. length: 2.5 mi (4.0 km)
- Surface area: 324 acres (1.31 km^{2})
- Average depth: 29 ft (8.8 m)
- Max. depth: 70 ft (21 m)
- Water volume: 4.22 billion US gallons (0.0160 km^{3})
- Shore length^{1}: 17 mi (27 km)
- Surface elevation: 59 ft (18 m)
- ^{1} Shore length is not a well-defined measure.

== Towns ==
The Sleepy Hollow Lake community is located within the boundaries of three municipalities – the town of Coxsackie, NY, the town of Athens, NY and the Village of Athens, NY. The postal zip code for the community is 12015, as mail is serviced through the local post office in the Village of Athens. The nearest larger communities are Catskill, NY about 7 miles south, Kingston, NY and Rhinebeck, NY, both about 30 miles south, and Hudson, NY, just 2.5 miles directly across the Hudson River from the community, but reached by car via the Rip Van Winkle Bridge, about 10 driving miles away, or via a Hudson River ferry on Friday and Saturday evenings during summer months. An Amtrak passenger rail station, which some residents use to commute to New York City, is located in Hudson, NY.

== Fish ==
The lake is home to various game fish, including largemouth bass, smallmouth bass, and crappie. The New York State record white crappie (4 lbs 7 oz) was caught at Sleepy Hollow Lake in 2021.

== Birds ==
Sleepy Hollow Lake has many types of birds both seasonal and migratory. Bald Eagles, Peregrine Falcons, Red Tailed Hawks, Pileated Woodpeckers, Northern Harrier, Green Heron, Double-crested Cormorant, Great Blue Heron, Belted Kingfisher to name a few. Instagram account of wildlife at SHL.
