= Brick Row Historic District =

Historic district in New York, United States

- U.S. National Register of Historic Places
- U.S. Historic district
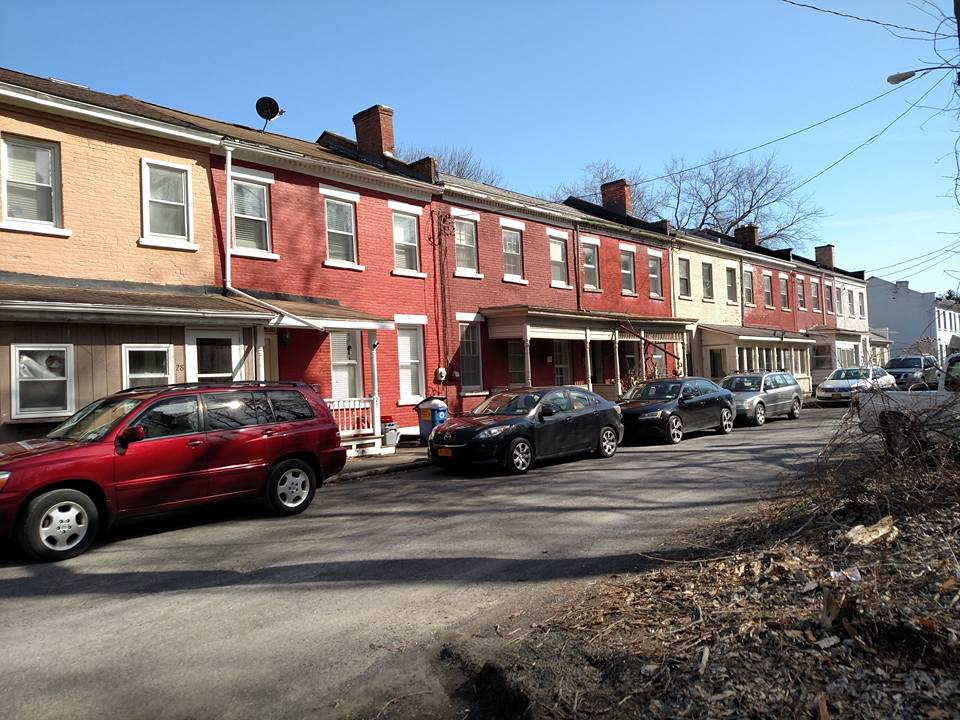
- Houses in the Brick Row Historic District

- Location within New York Location within the United States
- Location: Off NY 385; Athens, New York
- Coordinates: 42°16′39″N 73°47′55″W
- Area: 4 acres (1.6 ha)
- Built: 1864
- Architect: Saratoga & Hudson River Railroad
- Architectural style: Greek Revival
- MPS: Village of Athens MRA
- NRHP reference No.: 80002617
- Added to NRHP: November 28, 1980

The Brick Row Historic District in the village of Athens, New York is a small row of brick row houses that were built as apartments for the workers of the booming clay mining industry in the late 19th century to early 20th century. The row houses are found on Brick Row St. off route 385 just north of the village of Athens. The rows are close to the Hudson River.

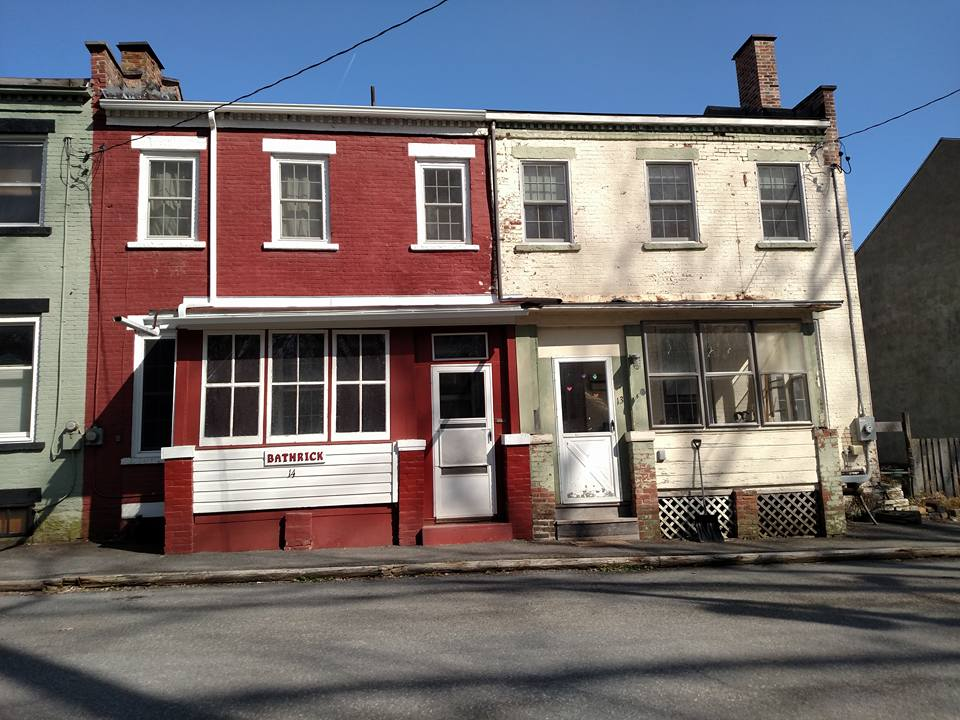
Detail of two houses in the district

It was listed on the National Register of Historic Places in 1980.
