= Stepping Stones Light =

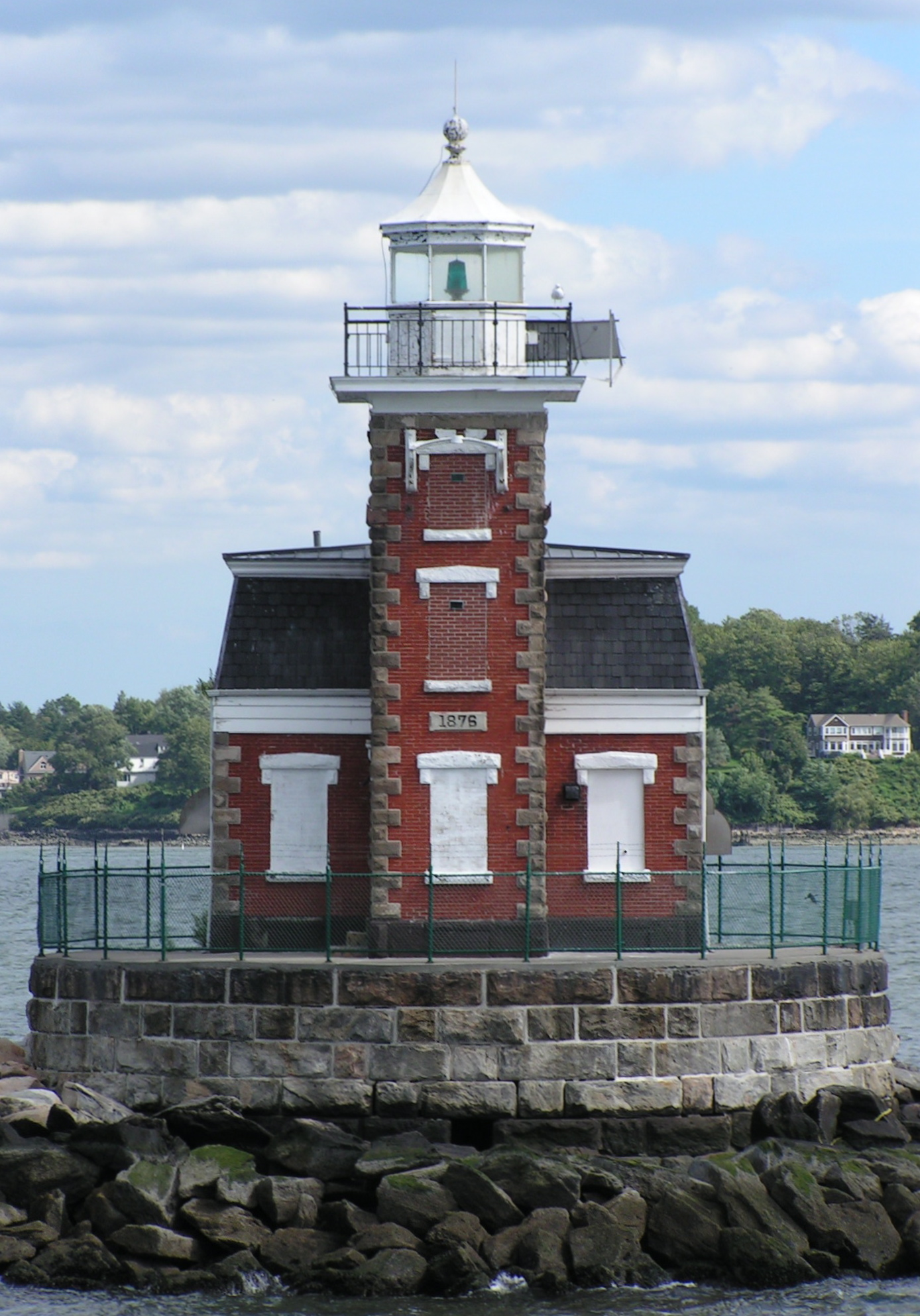
- Location: Long Island Sound, in Nassau County, New York. Marks outer end of reef
- Coordinates: 40°49′27.6″N 73°46′29.1″W

Tower
- Constructed: 1877
- Foundation: Granite and concrete pier
- Construction: Red brick
- Automated: 1967
- Height: 46 feet (14 m)
- Shape: Square, red brick, granite trim, black and white lantern
- Markings: White band on southwest face of pier
- Heritage: National Register of Historic Places listed place

Light
- First lit: 1877
- Focal height: 46 feet (14 m)
- Lens: Fifth order Fresnel, 1877 (original), 12 inches (300 mm) (current)
- Range: 8 nautical miles (15 km; 9.2 mi)
- Characteristic: Green light occulting every 4 sec
- Stepping Stones Light Station
- U.S. National Register of Historic Places
- Area: less than one acre
- Architect: U.S. Lighthouse Board
- Architectural style: Second Empire
- MPS: Light Stations of the United States MPS
- NRHP reference No.: 05001026
- Added to NRHP: September 15, 2005

Stepping Stones Light is a Victorian-style lighthouse in Long Island Sound, in Nassau County, New York. The lighthouse is square-shaped and made of red brick, standing one-and-a-half stories high. The Hudson-Athens Lighthouse is a virtual twin of this structure. The light is currently in use under the management of the United States Coast Guard. It is not open to the public.

The reef upon which it sits was given its name by Siwanoy (Minnefords) Native American legends. According to the legend, the tribe used warriors, medicine, and magic to chase the devil out of present-day Westchester County, New York onto City Island (formerly Greater Minneford Island), surrounding him at Belden Point. The devil then picked up huge boulders lying there and tossed them into Long Island Sound, using them as stepping stones to make his escape. The natives named the rocks "The Devil's Stepping Stones".

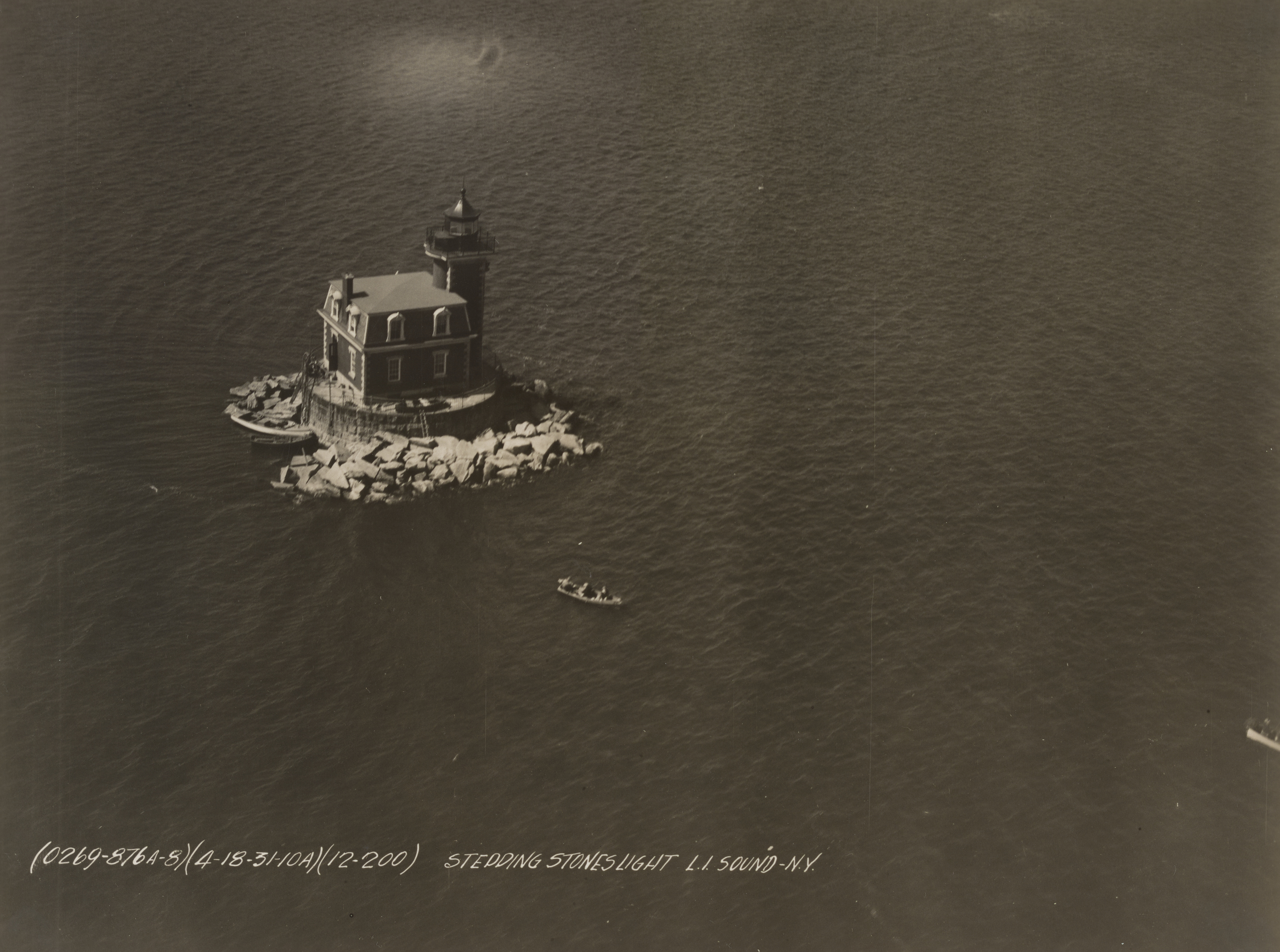
Historical photo, 1930

It was added to the National Register of Historic Places as Stepping Stones Light Station on September 15, 2005, reference number 05001026. The light station has been declared surplus, and the application for transfer under the National Historic Lighthouse Preservation Act of 2000 is under review. In 2008, the light station was transferred to the Town of North Hempstead. In 2014, the Town of North Hempstead entered into a partnership with the Great Neck Historical Society and the Great Neck Park District to raise funds to rehabilitate the Lighthouse. The National Park Service and New York State Senator Jack Martins provided $165,000 and $100,000 in grant funding, respectively, to support the restoration efforts.
