= Athens Lower Village Historic District =

Historic district in New York, United States

- U.S. National Register of Historic Places
- U.S. Historic district
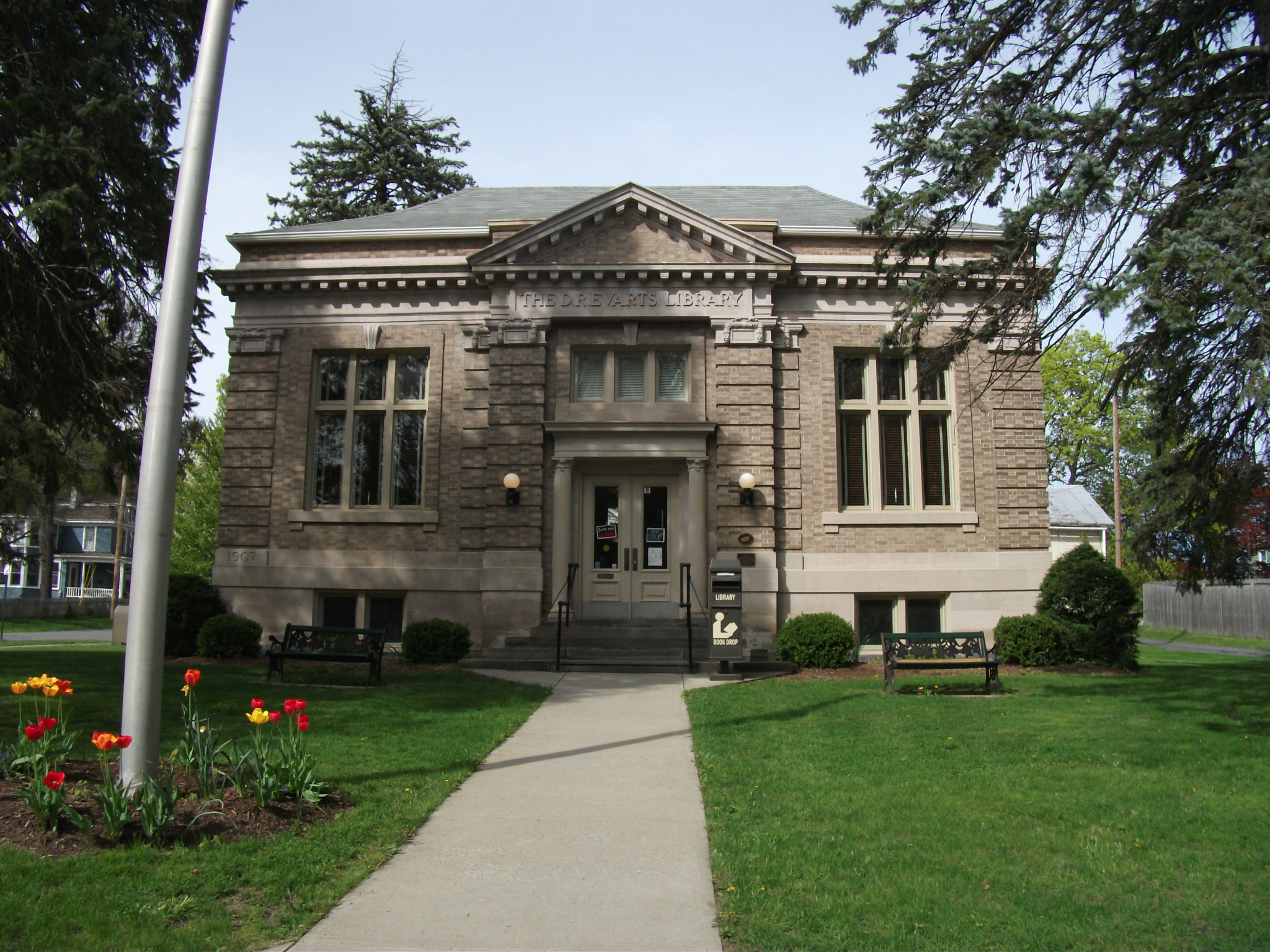
- Athens Public Library, May 2011

- Location within New York Location within the United States
- Location: Roughly bounded by Hudson River, NY 385, Vernon and Market Sts., Athens, New York
- Coordinates: 42°15′34″N 73°48′46″W
- Area: 175 acres (71 ha)
- Architect: Multiple
- Architectural style: Greek Revival, Late Victorian, Federal
- MPS: Village of Athens MRA
- NRHP reference No.: 80002616
- Added to NRHP: November 28, 1980

Athens Lower Village Historic District is a national historic district located at Athens in Greene County, New York. The district contains 267 contributing buildings, including the Jan Van Loon House built in 1706. It includes residential, commercial, and ecclesiastical structures built primarily during the 19th century in a variety of popular architectural styles.

It was listed on the National Register of Historic Places in 1980.

== See also ==
- National Register of Historic Places listings in Greene County, New York
