= Lucretia Johanna van Winter =

Dutch art collector

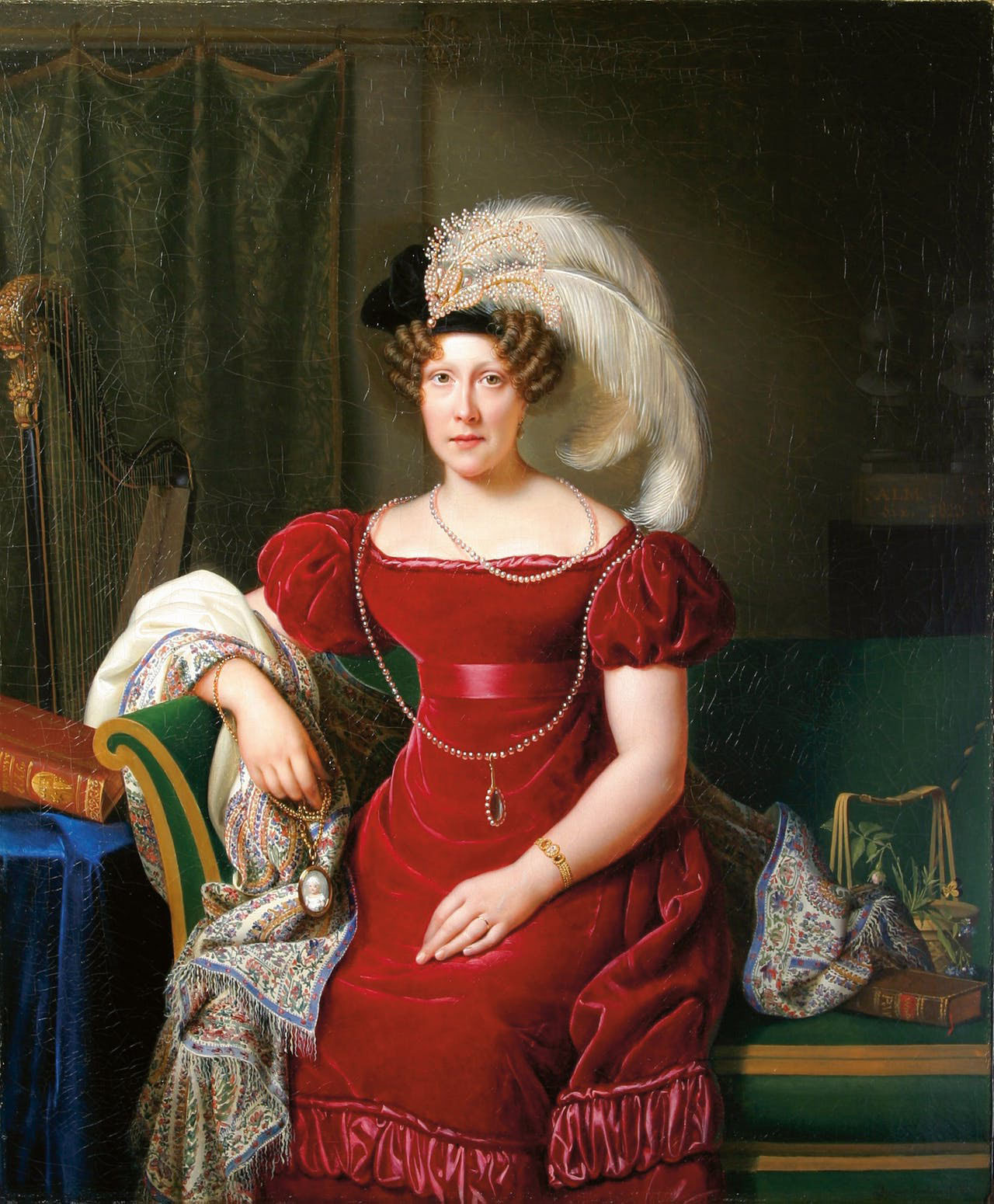
- Portrait of Lucretia Johanna van Winter by Alexandre Jean Dubois-Drahonet
- Born: April 15, 1785; Amsterdam
- Died: February 28, 1845 (aged 59); Amsterdam

Lucretia Johanna van Winter (April 15, 1785 – February 28, 1845) was a Dutch art collector.

Winter was born in Amsterdam as the oldest child of the wealthy merchant Pieter van Winter who received visitors to his art gallery that he had installed at the rear of his house Saxenburg, Keizersgracht 244. He had purchased the house for the astronomical sum of Dfl. 100,000 from Jean de Neufville. In 1800 her mother died and in 1807 her father died, leaving the collection as it then was in the family home, the portraits of which became the property of Lucretia's brother. The rest of the paintings were to be divided between Lucretia and her younger sister Anna Louisa, who would later amass her own art collection.

After her brother's marriage Lucretia bought the house Herengracht 440 in 1809. Her father's art gallery remained available for viewing at her parents’ home (now her brother's residence) and were to be split after the youngest sister Anna Louisa came of age. Anna Louisa took her portion of the collection when she married jonkheer Willem van Loon in 1815, but Lucretia had already made her first art purchases since 1810 with a view to forming her own art gallery and united her half of her father's collection with this modest collection of her own. She continued collecting in her own name until 1820, purchasing in total 71 paintings on her own. In 1822 at the age of 37 Lucretia married Hendrik Six van Hillegom (1790-1847) and the couple moved into his house at Herengracht 509-511. After that all art purchases were made in his name, but it is assumed that she remained an avid collector since there are no records of him making art purchases before his marriage.

Among the most notable of the paintings Lucretia bought herself are Vermeer's Milkmaid and The Little Street. After the death of Lucretia the collection went to her husband and on his death in 1847 it fell to their sons. In 1877 the heirs of Anna Louisa sold the Van Loon-Winter collection as a block to the Paris Rothschild family, which caused a stir in the Dutch papers (it included the Pendant portraits of Maerten Soolmans and Oopjen Coppit, among others). When Lucretia's children died her grandchildren also expected to sell the collection, but a large portion was acquired by the Rijksmuseum amidst debates about the value. They accepted an offer from the heirs for Vermeer's milkmaid plus 38 other paintings for Dfl. 750.000.
