= Van Loan =

Van Loan is a surname. Notable people with the surname include:

- Carl Van Loan (born 1980), American skier
- Charles F. Van Loan (born 1947), American computer scientist
- Peter Van Loan (born 1963), Canadian politician

== See also ==
- Van Loan Hill, a mountain in Greene County, New York
- Van Loon, the original spelling of the surname
