= Hudson–Athens Lighthouse =

Lighthouse in New York, United States

Hudson–Athens lighthouse
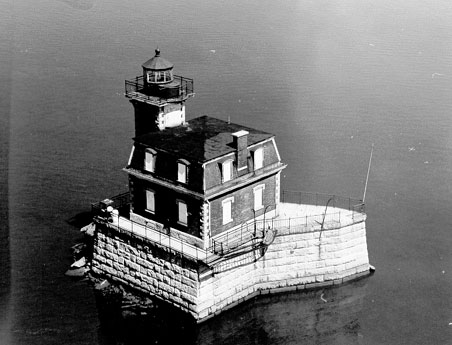
- Location: Hudson River, between Athens and Hudson
- Coordinates: 42°15′7″N 73°48′31″W

Tower
- Constructed: 1874
- Foundation: Granite caisson
- Construction: Dressed Stone and red brick
- Automated: 1949
- Height: 46 feet (14 m)
- Shape: Square, red brick, granite trim
- Heritage: National Register of Historic Places listed place
- Fog signal: Fog bell mechanism at 15 sec intervals

Light
- First lit: 1874
- Focal height: 15 m (49 ft)
- Lens: fifth order Fresnel (1926), 12-inch (300 mm) light (current)
- Range: 4 nautical miles (7.4 km; 4.6 mi)
- Characteristic: Green light Light_characteristic every 2.5 sec
- Hudson–Athens Lighthouse
- U.S. National Register of Historic Places
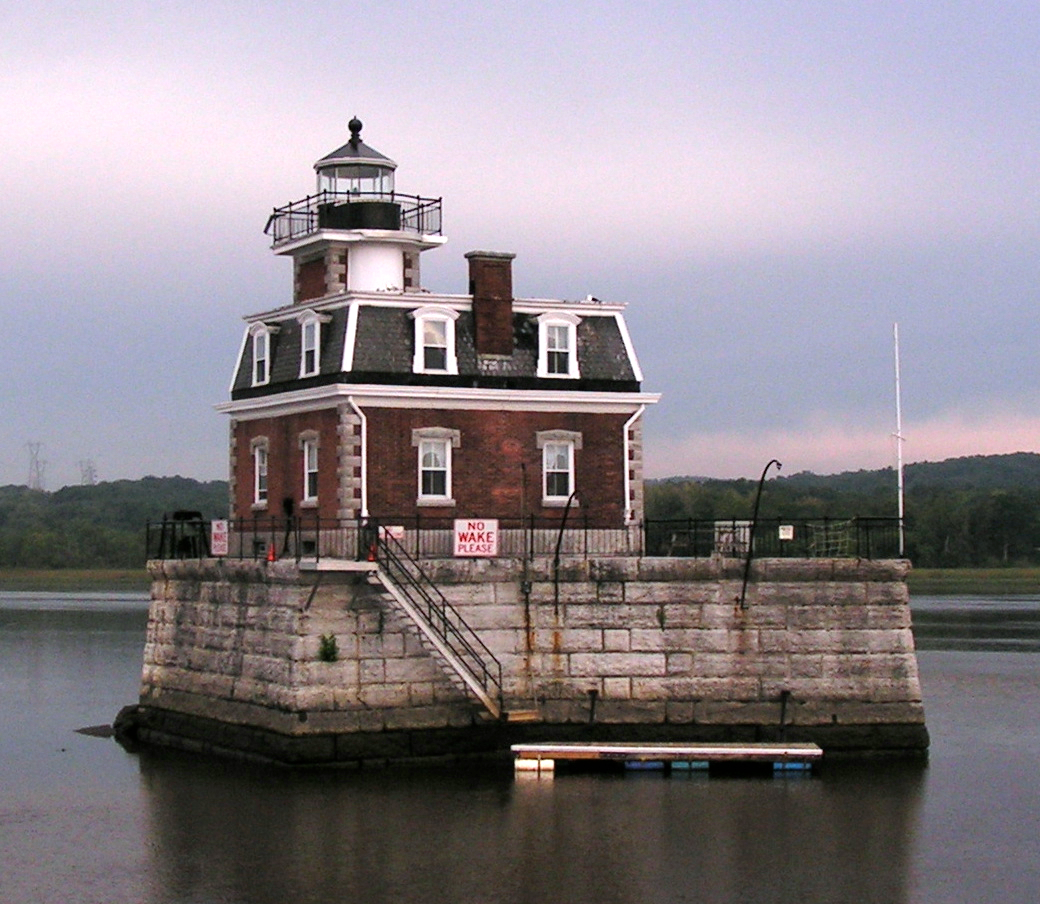
- Hudson–Athens Lighthouse, September 2006
- MPS: Hudson River Lighthouses TR
- NRHP reference No.: 79003796
- Added to NRHP: May 29, 1979

The Hudson–Athens Lighthouse, sometimes called the Hudson City light, is a lighthouse located in the Hudson River in the state of New York in the United States. The light is located between Hudson on the east bank and Athens on the west, closer to the Hudson side. Constructed in 1874, it marks a sandy ridge known as Middle Ground Flats and also acts as a general aid to navigation of the river. The station is built on a granite caisson with an unusual shape designed to protect it from ice floes and river debris. The dwelling is constructed in the Second Empire architectural style, with a mansard roof. It is considered to be virtually a twin of the Stepping Stones Light in Long Island Sound, which was constructed just a few years later.

== History ==
The station's beacon was originally lighted by Henry D. Best, the station's first lightkeeper, on November 14, 1874. It was upgraded to a fifth-order Fresnel lens in 1926, and the station was fully automated on November 10, 1949. In 1967, the Hudson River Valley Commission, led by Nelson A. Rockefeller, suggested that certain lighthouses owned by the United States Coast Guard be turned over to not-for-profit historical groups to ensure their preservation and upkeep. Hudson–Athens was the first station to be tried through such a program, and on February 15, 1984, a 20-year lease was signed between the Coast Guard and the Hudson–Athens Lighthouse Preservation Society (HALPS). In 2000, title to the station was turned over permanently to HALPS. Today, the Preservation Society conducts occasional tours of the station, which is being restored to its condition as it would have been in the 1930s.

The Lighthouse was documented by the Historic American Buildings Survey (HABS) as survey number NY-6286. There are 9 architectural drawings available in the survey.

The Hudson–Athens Lighthouse is shown on the NOAA Chart 12347.

=== Chronology ===
Chronology from USCG web site

- 1872: Congress of U.S. approves $35,000.00 to build the lighthouse.
- 1873–1874: Lighthouse was constructed.
- 1874, November 14: Lighthouse was put into operation with Henry D. Best as the first keeper.
- 1949, November 10: The lighthouse was automated.
- 1940s: Electricity was installed.
- 1967: Nelson A. Rockefeller established the Hudson River Valley Commission, which suggested the USCG deed over or lease lighthouse facilities to public or not-for-profit groups for maintenance and preservation.
- 1982: Hudson–Athens Lighthouse Preservation Society was formed.
- February 15, 1984: A 20-year lease between the Lighthouse Preservation Society and the USCG was signed. This was the first lease of its kind.
- 2002: Occasional tours are available to the public through the Lighthouse Preservation Society
- 2024: National Trust for Historic Preservation included the lighthouse on its 2024 list of 11 most-endangered historic places.

== Cultural ==
The Archives Center at the Smithsonian National Museum of American History has a collection (#1055) of souvenir postcards of lighthouses and has digitized 272 of these and made them available online. These include postcards of Hudson–Athens Light with links to customized nautical charts provided by National Oceanographic and Atmospheric Administration.

The Hudson–Athens Lighthouse is featured in the book Curious Constructions – A Peculiar Portfolio Of Fifty Fascinating Structures by Michael Hearst.

The lighthouse can be briefly seen in the 1959 noir film, Odds Against Tomorrow.
