= Two Row Wampum Treaty =

1613 Treaty between the Haudenosaunee Confederacy and Dutch Government

Two Row Wampum Treaty Tawagonshi Agreement of 1613
- The Two Row Wampum Belt, a visual representation of the treaty and its principles.
- Type: Bilateral treaty
- Context: Established Kaswentha principle of mutual coexistence, equality, and non-intervention between the Haudenosaunee and Dutch colonists; interpreted by the Haudenosaunee to apply to their relationship with all European colonial states.
- Signed: 1613
- Location: Tawagonshi, Haudenosauneega (modern Albany, New York)
- Negotiators: Jacob Eelckens
- Parties: Haudenosaunee; Dutch Republic
- Languages: Dutch; Mohawk; Onondaga

The Two Row Wampum Treaty, also known as Guswenta or Kaswentha and as the Tawagonshi Agreement of 1613 or the Tawagonshi Treaty, is a mutual treaty agreement made in 1613 between representatives of the Five Nations of the Haudenosaunee (or Iroquois) and representatives of the Dutch government in what is now upstate New York. The agreement is considered by the Haudenosaunee to be the basis of all of their subsequent treaties with European and North American colonial governments, including the Covenant Chain treaty with the British in 1677 and the Treaty of Canandaigua with the United States in 1794.

The treaty is spiritually and culturally revered and widely accepted among the Indigenous peoples in the relevant territories, and documented by wampum belts and oral tradition. However, in more recent years the authenticity of the later, written versions of the agreement have been a source of debate, with some scholarly sources maintaining that a treaty between the Dutch and the Mohawk nations did not take place or took place at a later date. In August 2013, the Journal of Early American History published a special issue dedicated to exploring the Two Row Tradition.

== Background ==
At the start of the 17th century, the Haudenosaunee Mohawk and the Mahican territory abutted in what is now known as the mid-Hudson Valley. Soon after Henry Hudson's 1609 exploration of what is now known as the Hudson River and its estuary, traders from the United Provinces of the Netherlands set up factorijs (trading posts) to engage in the fur trade, exploiting for extractive purposes the trade networks that had existed for millennia. The Dutch traded with the indigenous populations to supply fur pelts particularly from beaver, which were abundant in the region. By 1614, the New Netherland Company was established and Fort Nassau was built, setting the stage for the development of the colony of New Netherland.

== Kaswentha ==
In the Haudenosaunee languages, kaswentha (Onondaga: gaswę́hdaʼ, Cayuga: ga̱hswę́hdaˀ, Seneca: gahswë́hdaʼ) is the word for a wampum belt.

According to Jon Parmenter:

Kaswentha may best be understood as a Haudenosaunee term embodying the ongoing negotiation of their relationship to European colonizers and their descendants; the underlying concept of kaswentha emphasizes the distinct identity of the two peoples and a mutual engagement to coexist in peace without interference in the affairs of the other. The Two Row Belt, as it is commonly known, depicts the kaswentha relationship in visual form via a long beaded belt of white wampum with two parallel lines of purple wampum along its length – the lines symbolizing a separate-but-equal relationship between two entities based on mutual benefit and mutual respect for each party’s inherent freedom of movement – neither side may attempt to "steer" the vessel of the other as it travels along its own, self-determined path. A nineteenth-century French dictionary of the Mohawk language defined the very word for wampum belt (kahionni) as a human-made symbol emulating a river, due in part to its linear form and in part to the way in which its constituent shell beads resemble ripples and waves. Just as a navigable water course facilitates mutual relations between nations, thus does kahionni, "the river formed by the hand of man", serve as a sign of "alliance, concord, and friendship" that links "divergent spirits" and provides a "bond between hearts".

== The treaty ==
"Contemporary Haudenosaunee oral tradition identifies the original elaboration of kaswentha relations between Haudenosaunee nations and Europeans with a circa 1613 agreement negotiated between Mohawks and a Dutch trader named Jacob Eelckens at Tawagonshi, as a precursor to the formal establishment of Dutch Fort Nassau at nearby Normans Kill." According to Parmenter, "Dating of the original agreement prior to circa 1620 finds support in [a] 1701 recitation, in which Haudenosaunee delegates described their original agreement with the Dutch occurring 'above eighty years' prior to that date, and in 1744 Onondaga headman Canasatego dated the origin of the relationship to "above One Hundred Years Ago'."

Parmenter has investigated the extent to which Haudenosaunee oral tradition is corroborated by surviving documentary (written) records and found that "the documentary evidence, considered in the aggregate, reveals a striking degree of consistency over time in the expression of fundamental principles of the kaswentha tradition by Haudenosaunee speakers", with "the fullest single written source that corroborates the early seventeenth-century origins of a kaswentha relationship between Haudenosaunee nations and the Dutch appear[ing] in [...] 1689". And the earliest record of Haudenosaunee speakers explicitly mentioning or reciting the kaswentha tradition before Anglo-American and French colonial audiences dates to more than 30 years before this, in 1656 (43 years after the putative origin of the treaty in 1613).

While the evidence that the Haudenosaunee and the Dutch entered into some kind of political or economic agreement in the early seventeenth century is overwhelming, some historians have found reasons to be cautious about assuming the nature of that agreement was formal and treaty-like. The Dutch were conniving and duplicitous with an endgame of trying to displace the Natives, and rarely upheld any agreements whether they were official or not. The Dutch, for example, may not have recognized their agreement with the Haudenosaunee as a "treaty" in the way that Haudenosaunee tradition remembers it, and may instead have seen their agreement as something less official and more perfunctorily. Mark Meuwese has examined the history of Dutch-Indigenous relations in Africa and Brazil and found that, before 1621, "Dutch traders did not conclude treaties with Native peoples in the Atlantic world. Various agreements and alliances were made, but these took place only when specific factors were involved — the threat of Iberian intervention and the presence of centralized political orders among Indigenous peoples, factors that were not present in North America." Similarly, examining Dutch language sources pertaining to early Dutch trade voyages to the Hudson River and other areas in the mid-Atlantic region, Jaap Jacobs finds that "Dutch traders would have had no need to make a treaty with local Indian groups on behalf of the Dutch nation and there is no indication that they did so. On the other hand, there is good reason to believe that Dutch traders and local Native people would have made some sort of agreement as indicated by the Dutch building of the Fort Nassau on native lands and the Kleyntjen affair." Jacobs concludes (along with Paul Otto) that

whatever agreements or negotiations traders such as Jacob Eelkens and Hendrick Christiansen may have made with Native peoples, these could not be construed, at least in European terms, as diplomatic treaties between sovereign nations. [... This] does not, however, discredit the tradition of an agreement between Dutch and Haudenosaunee representatives that would later became the basis for Anglo-British and then American negotiations with the Haudenosaunee. The historical context does make it unlikely, at best, that such an event happened in the 1610s. The claim that 2013 is the four-hundredth anniversary of a first covenant is therefore not corroborated by historical research. However, after the 1621 establishment of the West India Company and particularly after the end of the Mohawk-Mahican War four years later, the context for such an enduring agreement is far more probable.

Nevertheless, Haudenosaunee tradition records not only the existence of a treaty, but its specific meaning, in the form of a Haudenosaunee reply to the initial Dutch treaty proposal:

You say that you are our Father and I am your Son. We say 'We will not be like Father and Son, but like Brothers.' This wampum belt confirms our words. [...] Neither of us will make compulsory laws or interfere in the internal affairs of the other. Neither of us will try to steer the other's vessel.

The treaty is considered by Haudenosaunee people to still be in effect. The Haudenosaunee tradition states:

As long as the Sun shines upon this Earth, that is how long our Agreement will stand; Second, as long as the Water still flows; and Third, as long as the Grass Grows Green at a certain time of the year. Now we have Symbolized this Agreement and it shall be binding forever as long as Mother Earth is still in motion.

== The Wampum Belt(s) ==
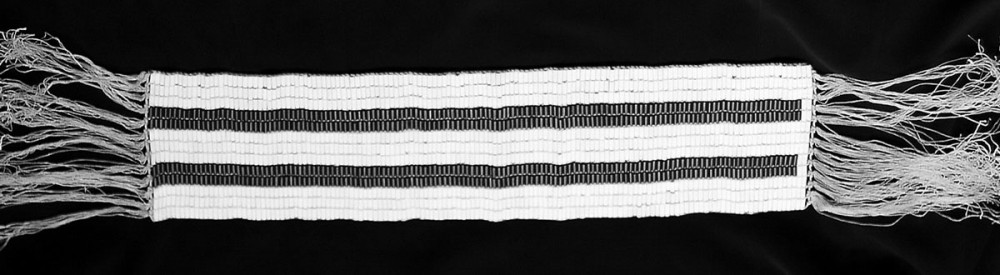
The Two Row Wampum is one of the oldest treaty relationships between the indigenous people of North America and European settlers. The treaty was made in 1613.

Wampum belts of the two-row style are merely one of many methods of representing in physical form the diplomatic and economic agreements implicit in the kaswentha relationship.

There is clear evidence of Haudenosaunee use of wampum for diplomatic functions during the pre-contact period, while the post-contact period saw "increasing significance of wampum as a material form to facilitate communication across cultural boundaries". Early evidence for wampum in the region indicates that the dominant style was a relatively simple, monochrome design, often with discoidal beads strung together (rather than tubular beads woven together). Historians debate whether or not the technology required to construct the sophisticated two-row style wampum belt (including, most importantly, tubular purple beads) was available to communities in the region prior to 1613; however, Parmenter indicates that archeological evidence does not rule out the possibility that two-row wampum belts may have featured in the initial treaty negotiations between the Dutch and the Haudenosaunee.

The significance of the two-row style of wampum, according to Parmenter, is that it captures the original "ship and canoe" metaphor present in the Haudenosaunee understanding of the kaswentha relationship. Parmenter explains how this "ship and canoe" metaphor is one of many "media" by which the Haudenosaunee have represented pictorially their relationship to European newcomers over the centuries, with other media including "a piece of tree bark or rope" and (later) images of an iron chain and, eventually, a burnished silver and/or covenant chain. But of these, it is the "ship and canoe" conception of the kaswentha relationship that is the deepest and most significant, and it is the two-row wampum that is understood to represent this conception most powerfully, with two rows of purple wampum beads against a background of white beads, each row representing a parallel river, down which the respective vessels of each people travel, independently but in mutual support of each other.

The question of what materials — wampum or otherwise — were exchanged at the initial negotiations of the treaty cannot be answered definitively. While it is possible that a two-row wampum belt featured in the initial treaty negotiations, there is no documentary evidence to support this claim. There is, however, evidence in the form of Haudenosaunee oral tradition that wampum belts featured, if not in the original negotiations, then at least in the earliest rituals of renewal (of which there were many) between the Haudenosaunee and the Dutch (later the British). According to Parmenter:

Three of the Haudenosaunee recitations (1656, 1722, and 1744) associate the agreement directly with wampum belts, and Johnson punctuated his 1748 recitation with a "large Belt of Wampum". Exchanges of wampum belts also occurred commonly in association with renewals of the alliance at treaty negotiations in which neither Haudenosaunee nor New York authorities were recorded making explicit recitations of the kaswentha tradition. On two such occasions the sources refer to a "Chain Belt," but no documented example provides a specific correlation with a Two Row-patterned belt.

While most of the earliest recorded recitations of the kaswentha relationship between the Haudenosaunee and the Dutch do not mention wampum belts specifically, descriptions "of wampum belts in documentary sources, particularly from the early period of contact, are notoriously vague." Moreover, as artifacts wampum belts were extremely prone to deterioration and disassembly, so there is no expectation that early belts should have survived had they in fact been exchanged in the early seventeenth century.

In any event, by 1870 the image of the two-row wampum belt had come to symbolize for the Haudenosaunee their ongoing treaty and kaswentha relationship with the Dutch crown.

Beyond the direct evidence represented by the recitations, additional documentary sources amplify our confidence in the deep roots of the fundamental concepts of the kaswentha relationship: its beginnings in the early decades of the seventeenth century, its rhetorical framing in terms of an "iron chain" forged and renewed with the Dutch prior to 1664, and its early association with the "ship and canoe" discourse present in the explicit "Two Row" articulations of the tradition that appear after circa 1870. It is important to point out that the while the language of the "chain" connecting the two peoples persisted in recitations of the tradition over time, it never supplanted the "ship and canoe" language characteristic of Haudenosaunee understandings of kaswentha. As illustrated in the recitations [...], the idea of a rope, and later a "chain" of iron, then silver represented a critical component of the tradition that bound the two peoples together in friendship as a necessary precursor to the kind of relationship embodied by two vessels travelling along a parallel route. The latter idea, in other words, related to the former concept – the two were neither incompatible nor mutually exclusive.

Diana Muir Appelbaum has written that:

there is no evidence that such a thing as an "original" two-row wampum belt ever existed. Nor is there any evidence of the existence of a 1613 treaty beyond a claim traceable to a document forged in the 1960s by a historian who collected and wrote about old manuscripts.

Indeed, no documentary evidence (including wampum, which is very fragile) survive from the original treaty negotiations of 1613. But, as Parmenter points out:

Evidence of Haudenosaunee and European recitations of the kaswentha tradition indicates clearly that the remarkable durability over time of ideas associated with a Two Row relationship does not depend on the legitimacy of a single document and that Haudenosaunee and contemporary Europeans "verbalized" these ideas long before the late nineteenth century. [...] Kaswentha relations were not static – they evolved over time as ties between the Haudenosaunee and the Dutch (and the latter's English and American successors) deepened and sociopolitical circumstances grew more complex – but they did exist. Indeed, [...] it is incumbent upon all scholars considering the historicity of indigenous (not only Haudenosaunee) oral traditions (especially regarding something as fundamentally significant as kaswentha), to do more than simply identify a single document as a fake, or to set the bar for evidentiary proof of a concept's existence to practically impossible standards – such as requiring a surviving "physical" Two Row belt from the colonial era that can be explicitly associated with a documentary source.

== Oral tradition ==
Onondaga leaders state that the oral tradition which accompanies the wampum belts is evidence that an agreement was made in 1613. Andy Mager of the Syracuse Peace Council was quoted in The Post-Standard as saying "We believe the Haudenosaunee oral history of the treaty...We believe the basic outlines of a treaty and that a treaty was negotiated between representatives of the Dutch and the Haudenosaunee in or around 1613."

== Interpretations of the treaty ==
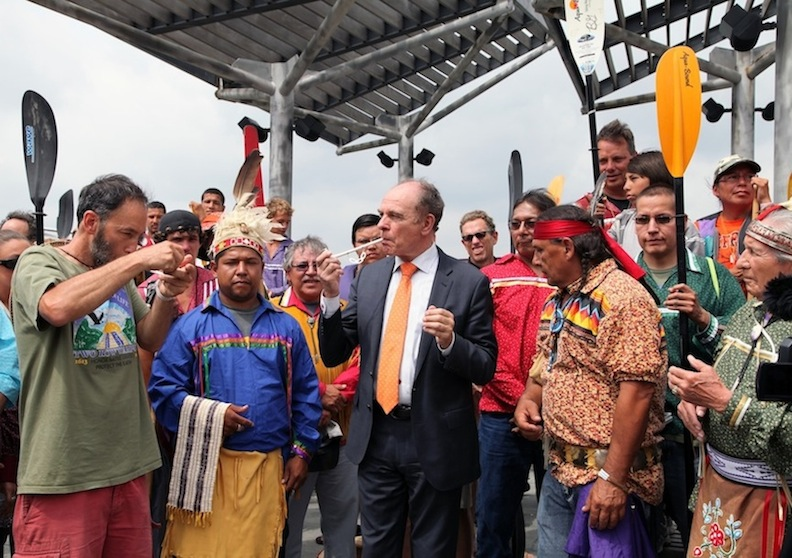
Andy Mager, Hickory Edwards, Netherlands Consul Rob de Vos, Chief Jake Edwards and Faithkeeper Oren Lyons reaffirm the Two Row treaty

The Netherlands have been called upon as allies by Haudenosaunee in international affairs, notably at the League of Nations in 1923 in a conflict with Canada over membership and at the United Nations in 1977, requesting the Haudenosaunee passport to be honored internationally. The Dutch government honored the passport until 2010. It remains unclear if the policy will be changed in recognition of the 400th anniversary of the treaty. In September 2013, three Haudenosaunee leaders traveled to the Netherlands for an official visit in recognition of the anniversary, traveling on Haudenosaunee passports.

The Two Row Wampum continues to play a role in defining the relationship between citizens of New York State and Haudenosaunee residents of the region. In 2006, a dispute over whether Onondaga Nation students could be permitted to wear native regalia at their graduation ceremony at Lafayette High School in LaFayette, New York, was resolved in part through the school board's consideration and application of the principles of the Two Row Wampum.

Larger disputes concerning extant treaties based on the Two Row Wampum, such as the Treaty of Canandaigua, remain unresolved through litigation and pending land claims.

The Two Row Treaty contradicts the 15th Century Doctrine of Discovery, which decreed that Christian European nations could seize lands of non-Christian peoples whom they encountered in the New World. Modern legal rulings, including a 2005 decision by the US Supreme Court against Haudenosaunee plaintiffs, continue to hinge on that doctrine, and Two Row Treaty supporters promote the treaty as a legal standard to replace it.

The Two Row Wampum Flag

Supporters of the Two Row Wampum Treaty note that it conveys a respect for the laws of nature and thus an obligation for ecological stewardship. The treaty has been cited as an inspiration to clean up polluted waters such as Onondaga Lake and the Mohawk River. "Water is sacred, like all parts of creation," said Freida Jacques, an Onondaga Clanmother. "All life relies on it. It has a sacred duty, given to it by the Creator, to give all creation clean, fresh water."

The Two Row Wampum Flag, whose design is based off the original wampum belt, has been adopted as a modern symbol by supporters of the Treaty and its values.

== Tawagonshi document ==
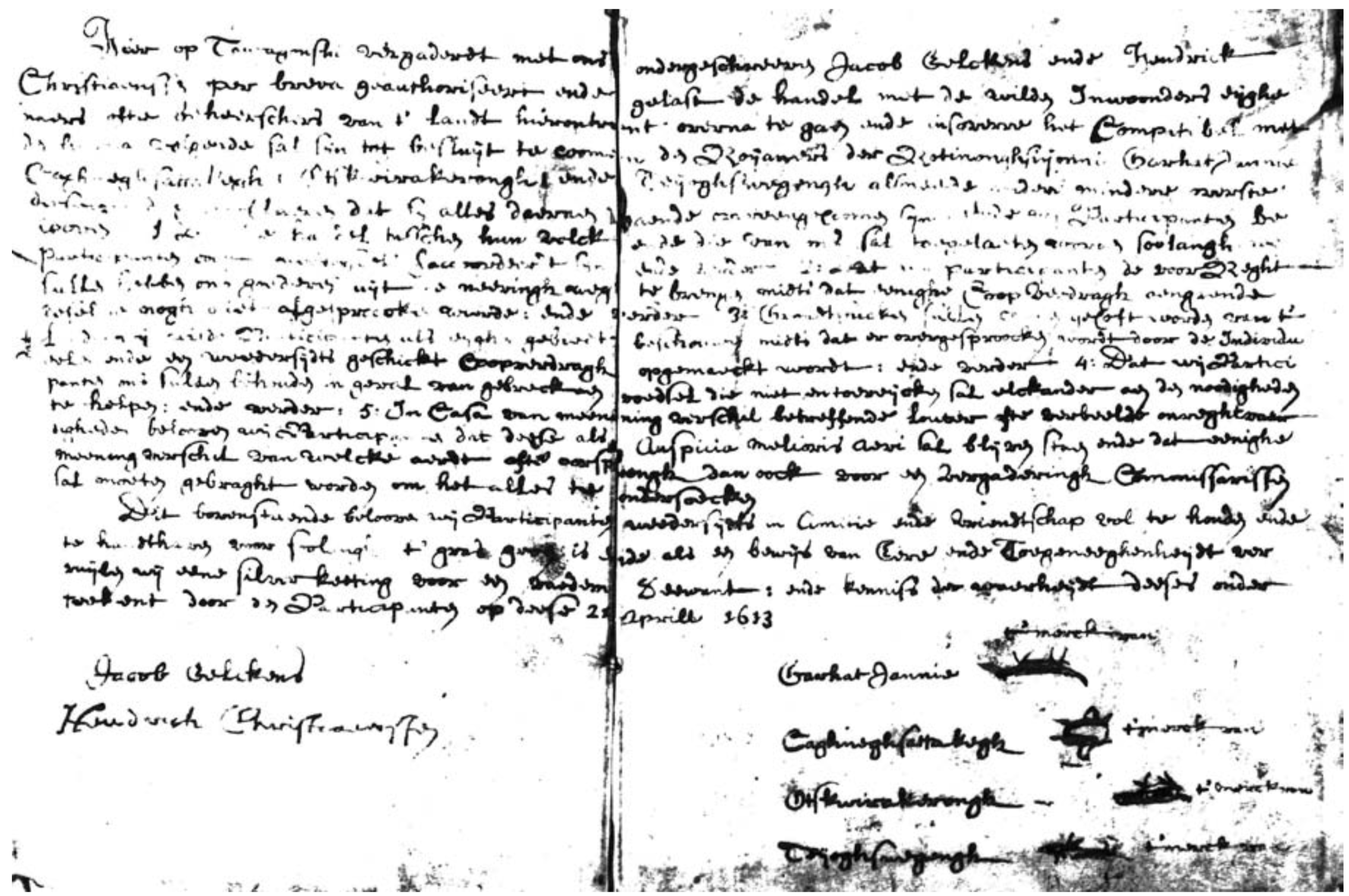
The Tawagonshi document. New York State Library/Manuscripts and Special Collections, L.G. van Loon Collection (SC16677)

The existence of an alleged written version of the treaty was first made public in an article in 1968 by documents collector L.G. van Loon. He claimed to have acquired it from an unnamed person on the Mississauga reserve in Canada.

In 1987, academics Charles Gehring, William Starna, and William Fenton published an article in the New York History journal entitled "The Tawagonshi Treaty of 1613: The Final Chapter." Their theory is that this written version is a forgery because it contains what they argue are grammatical anachronisms; that a blend of handwriting styles from the 17th and 20th centuries is used; that the names of villages and not chiefs are used; and that the writing is "too smooth" to be made by a 17th-century quill pen. Herkens writes that the document contains c. 40 grammatical anachronisms, and that on grammatical grounds it is likely that the text was written in the 20th century. Given that Van Loon forged other pieces from the same period, they point to him as the most probable forger. In 2013, linguistic experts Harrie Hermkens, Jan Noordegraaf, and Nicoline van der Sijs submitted the document to further linguistic and historical analysis, including its provenance and connection to Lawrence G. Van Loon. They also found the document to contain "a significant number of anachronisms making it impossible for the text to have originated in 1613. Nor is it possible that it is a later copy of a document since lost."

Robert Venables, a retired Cornell University professor, is among those who remain convinced that the document version is also valid, and concurs with other scholars who point out that any inconsistencies in language and pen strokes can be explained by the fact that it was copied by hand years after 1613.

The document was given to the Onondagas and remains near Syracuse, New York.

== 400th Anniversary Celebration ==
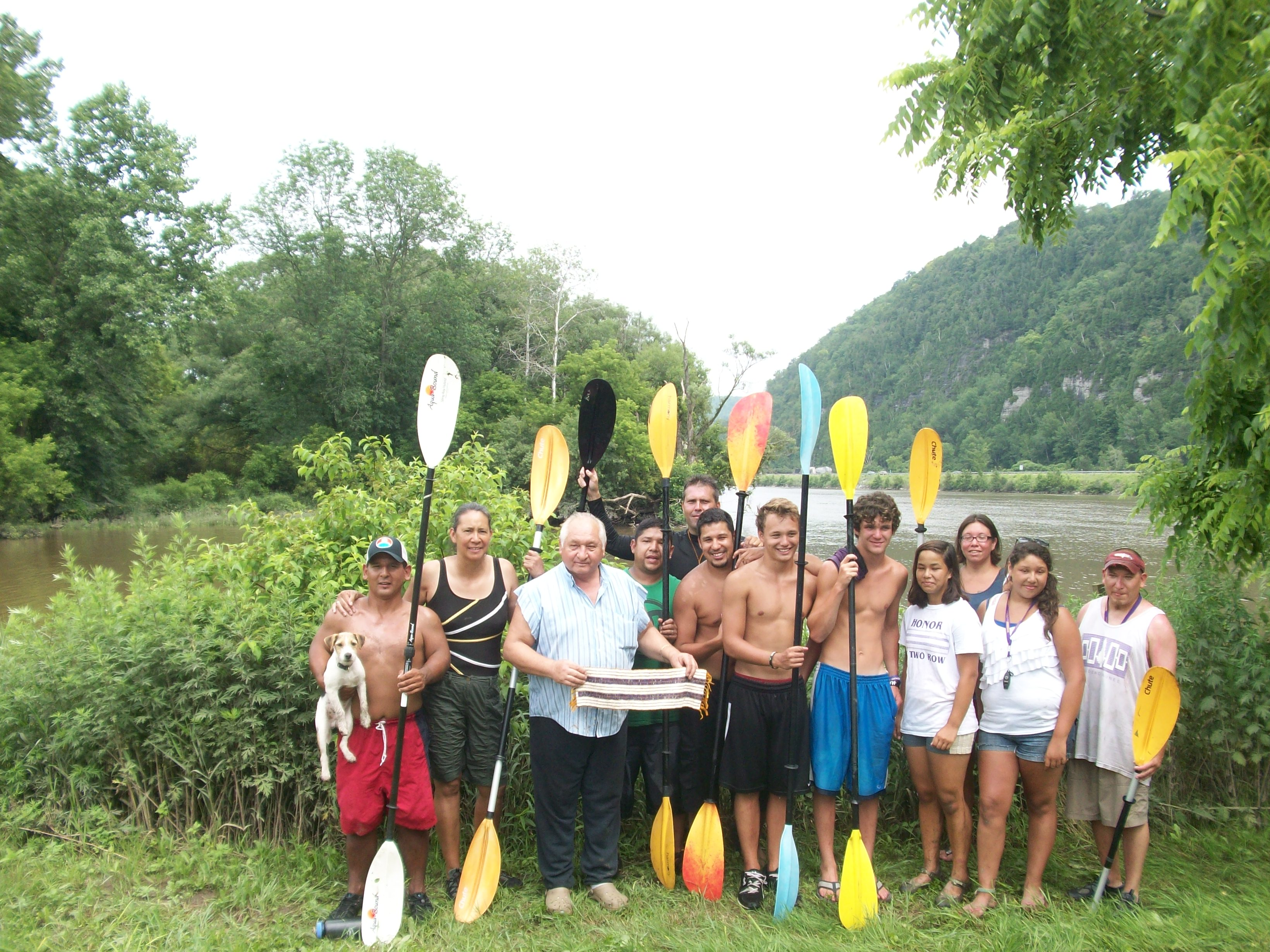
First paddlers arrive at Kanatsiohareke, with Sakokwenionkwas Tom Porter, July 2013

In July and August 2013, hundreds of Native Americans and their allies took part in a river journey to recognize and renew the Two Row Wampum Treaty. Canoeing and kayaking across New York State, the participants called attention to the treaty and its significance for native land rights and environmental protection. The paddlers traveled from Onondaga, birthplace of the Haudenosaunee league, along the Mohawk and Hudson rivers to New York City, ending at a special session at the United Nations. The anniversary journey brought world attention to the Two Row Treaty.

Organized by the Onondaga Nation and Neighbors of the Onondaga Nation (NOON), the renewal journey covered over 300 miles, with public events at sites including Kanatsiohareke Mohawk Community, Albany, Poughkeepsie, and Beacon NY, where Native leaders and public officials discussed the treaty and its bearing on current issues. On August 9, the paddlers arrived in New York City to attend a UN session for Indigenous Peoples Day with Secretary General Ban Ki-moon and member state representatives. At the session, UN officials underscored the UN's role as a peacemaker, negotiator, and advocate for treaty rights. Oren Lyons, a diplomat from the Onondaga Turtle Clan, described the Two Row Treaty as the foundation for all Haudenosaunee treaties, many since broken by New York State, the US and Canada. UN representatives from Panama and Bolivia described their work to restore land to native ownership and protection. The UN Secretary for Human Rights outlined the UN's goal to redress treaty violations, treat them as human rights violations, and help enforce treaties like the Two Row in the future.

== See also ==
- Ganienkeh
- Hendrick Christiaensen
- Mohawk Dutch
- Normans Kill
- Sewant
