= Zion Lutheran Church (Athens, New York) =

Historic church in New York, United States

- U.S. National Register of Historic Places
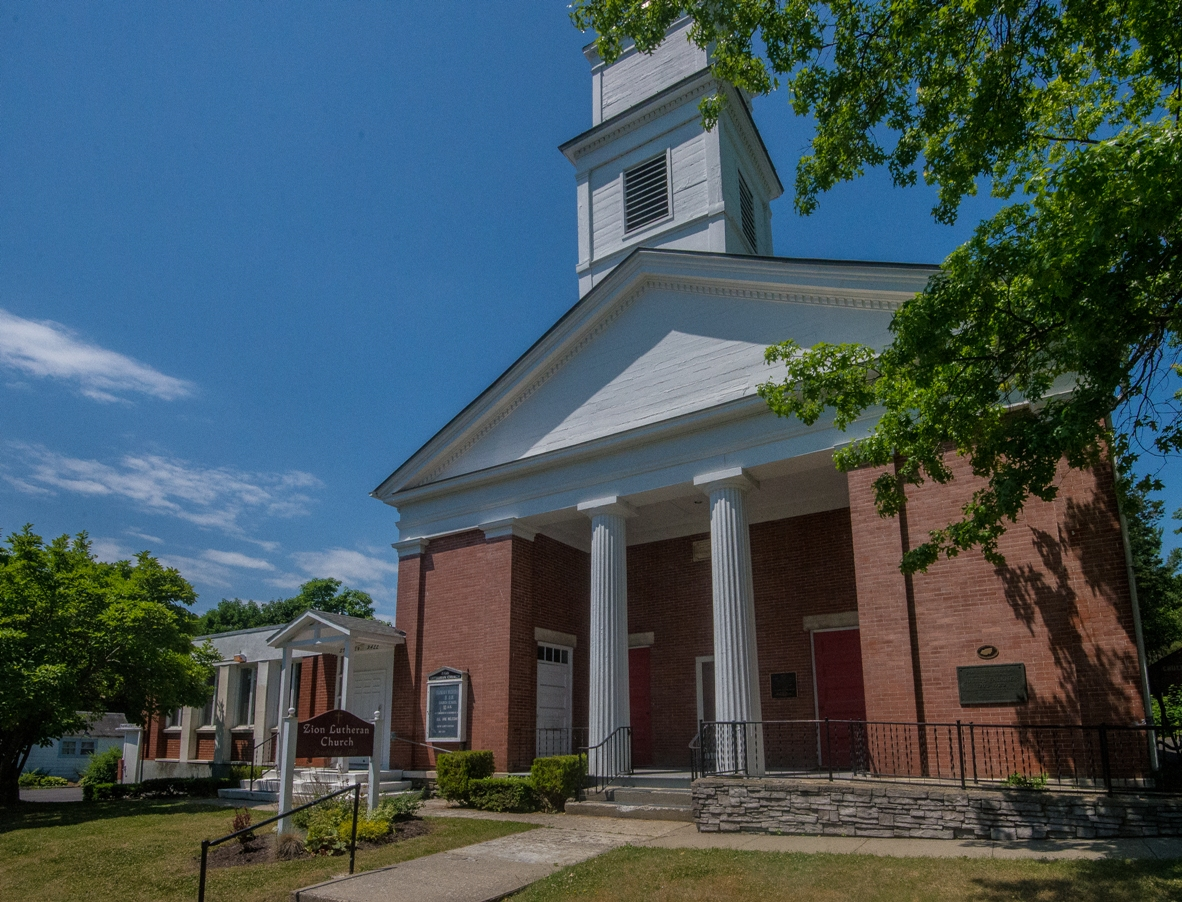

- Location within New York Location within the United States
- Location: N. Washington St., Athens, New York
- Coordinates: 42°16′5″N 73°48′21″W
- Area: 0 acres (0 ha)
- Built: 1853
- Architectural style: Greek Revival
- MPS: Village of Athens MRA
- NRHP reference No.: 80002620
- Added to NRHP: November 28, 1980

Zion Lutheran Church is a historic Lutheran church in Athens, Greene County, New York. It was built in 1853 and features a pair of wooden Doric order columns in antis and brick pilasters. The brick church is in the Greek Revival style and has a square, two stage tower.

It was added to the National Register of Historic Places in 1980.
