= Annewies van Winter =

Dutch art collector

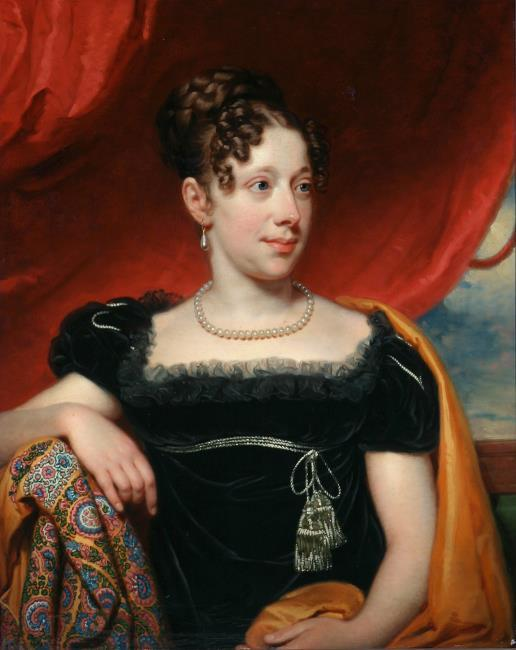
Annewies Winter

Annewies van Winter (1793-1877) was a Dutch art collector.

== Biography ==
van Winter was born in Amsterdam in 1793. She was the daughter of Pieter van Winter, a merchant, and Anna Louisa van der Poorten. Her paternal grandfather was the poet Nicolaas Simon van Winter. She had a brother and a half sister. Due to the business success of her father and grandfather, the van Winter family was well off financially, and so Annewies grew up amidst wealth. Her family was also in possession of a substantial collection (amounting to over 180 works) of 17th century Dutch and Flemish art, some of which was by masters such as Rembrandt and Johannes Vermeer. Just before her father died in 1807, he stipulated in his will that the van Winter's art collection should not be broken up until all three of his children were either married or 25 years in age. As she was 14 at the time, Annewies and followed her older sister Lucretia when the latter moved to a new home on the Herengracht in Amsterdam. There, Lucretia began to use parts of her considerable inheritance to buy new paintings for the van Winter's collection; she made these purchases in secret so the newly-acquired paintings would not be included in her father's soon to be decided collection. Lucretia also introduced Annewies to literature, poetry, music, and art collecting.

During this time Annewies became acquainted with Willem van Loon (1794-1847), and in 1815 the two announced their engagement. This allowed the family to begin dividing their art collection; Annewies and Lucretia divided the collection between them after buying out their brother's share.

Following her marriage, Annewies continued to acquire more paintings for her collection. When her sister died in 1845, Annewies required some of her paintings, bringing her collection to around 80 paintings. Her husband Willem died two years later in 1847, leaving Annewies as the sole heir to his estate.

When Annewies died in 1877 at the age of 84, her children sold her collection to Gustave baron de Rothschild of the French Rothschilds. This sale was controversial, and sparked claims that the artistic heritage of the Netherlands was being lost. This in turn helped to spur the effort to create an organization to preserve dutch art, later known as the Rembrandt Association.
