= Jan Van Loon House =

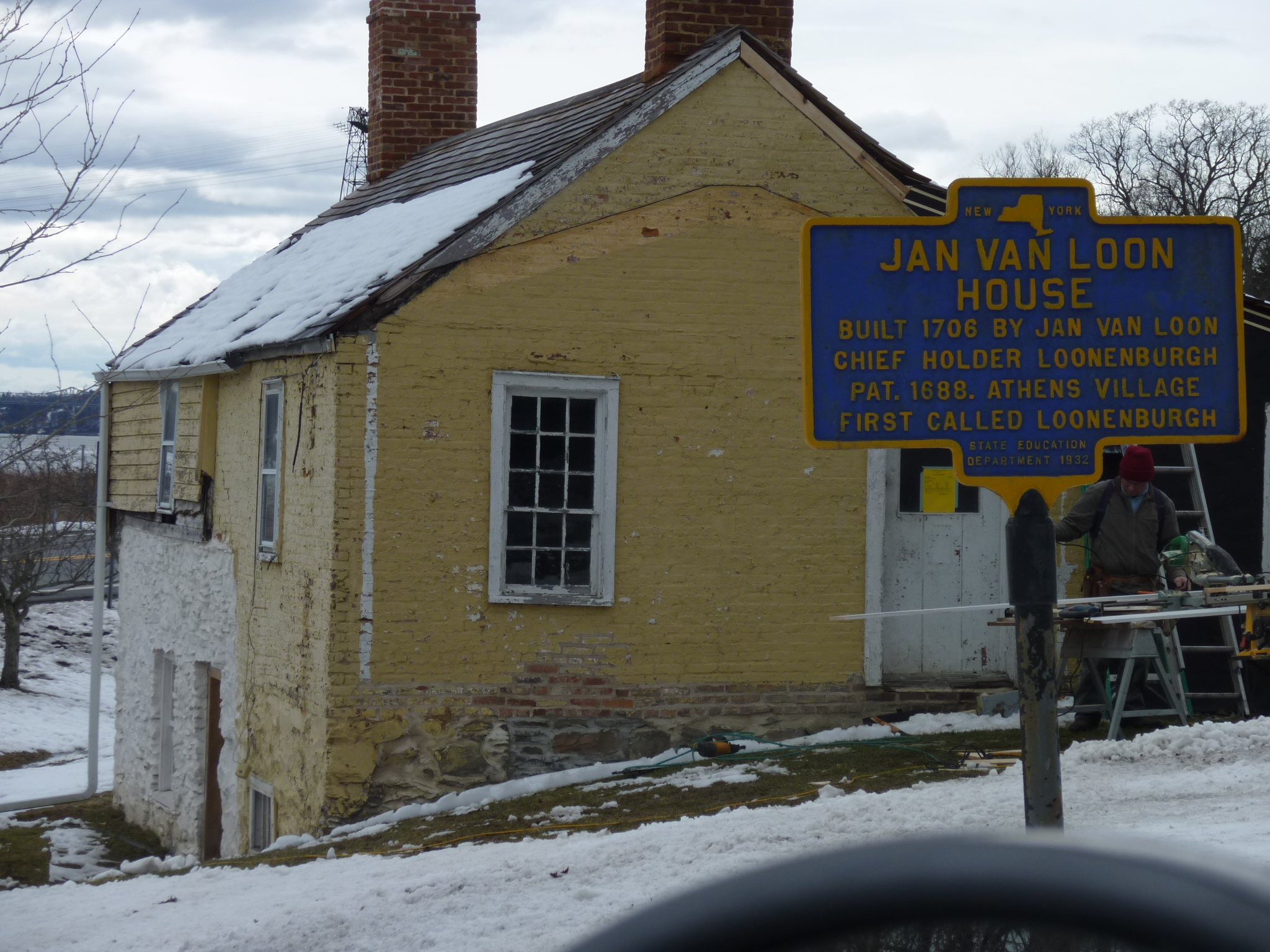
- Jan Van Loon House

- Location within New York Location within the United States

General information
- Type: residential home
- Location: 39 South Washington Street, Athens, New York, USA
- Coordinates: 42.257334°N 73.811824°W
- Elevation: 2.8 metres (9 ft 2 in)
- Named for: Jan Van Loon
- Completed: 1706

Technical details
- Material: brick
- Lifts/elevators: 0

The Jan Van Loon House (/væn ˈloʊn/, like van loan) is one of the oldest extant buildings in New York State. It is located in Athens, New York at 39 South Washington Street (also known as New York State Route 385). It is inside the Village of Athens Multiple Resource Area (MRA) and the Athens Lower Village Historic District. It was built by Jan Van Loon, who fathered eight children including Albertus Van Loon. Van Loon was a blacksmith by trade, but was also known to work in silver.

Van Loon was the earliest European settler to the area, purchasing the land in 1685. In 1688 he then gave the settlement its first name, Loonenburg. Only one wall of the original 1706 structure remains unchanged in the house.

Jan's grandchild, John M. Van Loon, sold the family lands on 30 April 1800 to Isaac Northrup, who then developed them into a more complete village.

In 1932, the New York State Education Department placed a historic marker outside the house:

JAN VAN LOON

HOUSE
BUILT 1706 BY JAN VAN LOON
CHIEF HOLDER LOONEBURGH
PAT. 1688. ATHENS VILLAGE

FIRST CALLED LOONEBURGH

— New York State Education Department,

== See also ==
- List of the oldest buildings in New York
- List of New York State Historic Markers in Greene County, New York
