= Athens, New York =

- Town
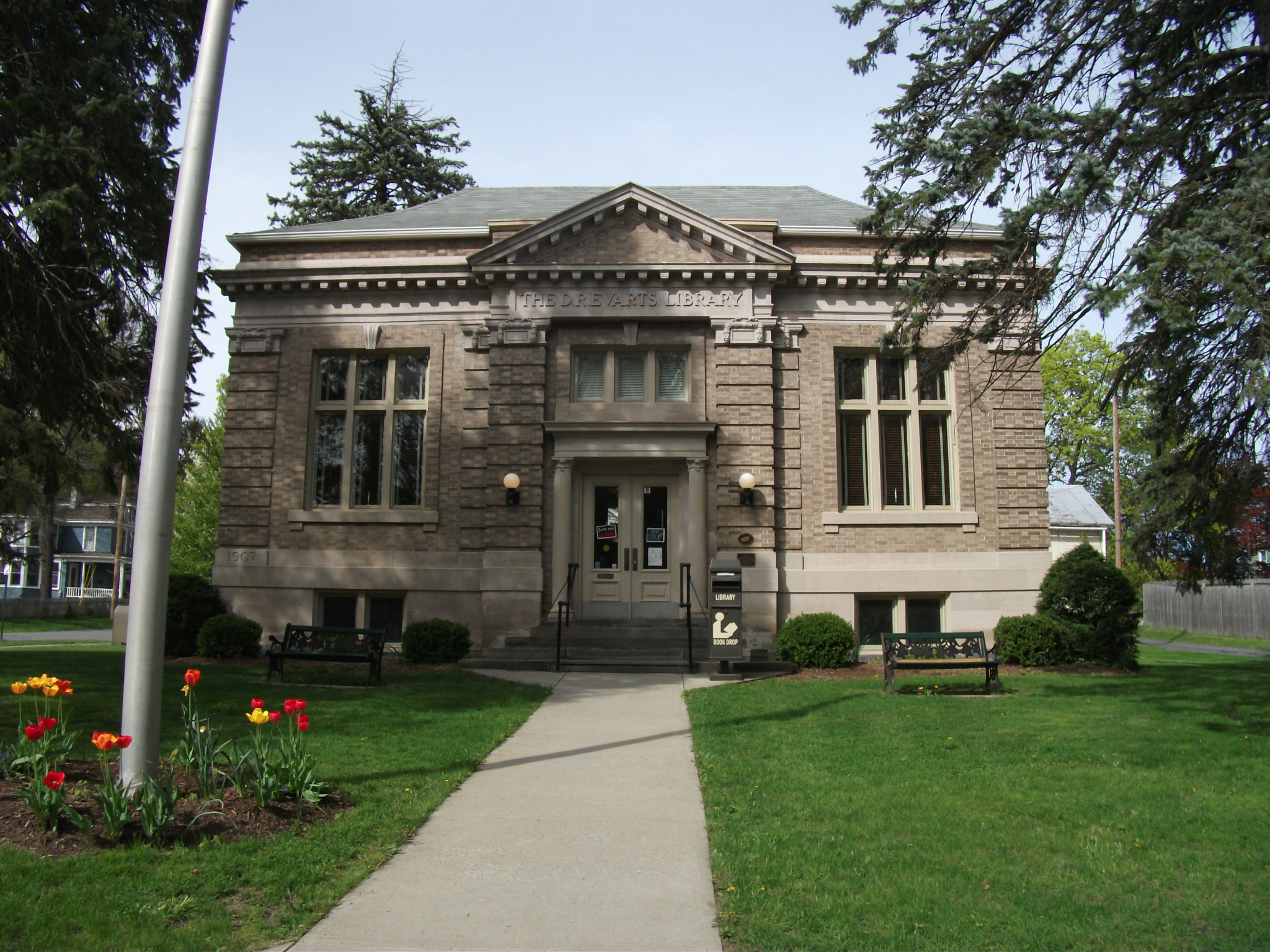
- Athens Public Library

- Seal

- Location in Greene County and the state of New York.

- Location of New York in the United States
- Coordinates: 42°16′07″N 73°48′20″W
- Country: United States
- State: New York
- County: Greene

Government
  - Village Mayor: Amy Serrago Town Council: Robert F. Butler, Jr. (R); Eugene J. Hatton (R); April Paluch (R); Phyllis Dinkelacker (D)
  - Town Supervisor: Michael Pirrone

Area
  - Total: 28.87 sq mi (74.77 km^{2})
  - Land: 26.25 sq mi (67.98 km^{2})
  - Water: 2.62 sq mi (6.79 km^{2})
- Elevation: 213 ft (65 m)

Population (2020)
  - Total: 3,916
  - Density: 149.2/sq mi (57.61/km^{2})
- Time zone: UTC-5 (EST)
  - Summer (DST): UTC-4 (EDT)
- ZIP Codes: 12015 (Athens); 12414 (Catskill); 12451 (Leeds)
- Area code: 518
- FIPS code: 36-02913
- GNIS feature ID: 978693
- Website: townofathensny.gov

Athens is a town in Greene County, New York, United States. The population was 3,916 at the 2020 census. The town of Athens has a village also called Athens. The town is near the eastern edge of the county.

== History ==
The town of Athens was formed on February 25, 1815 from parts of the towns of Catskill and Coxsackie.

In 1890, the total population was 2,361.

== Geography and climate ==
According to the United States Census Bureau, the town has a total area of 28.8 square miles (74.7 km^{2}), of which 26.2 square miles (67.8 km^{2}) is land and 2.7 square miles (6.9 km^{2}, or 9.22%) is water.

The eastern town line is defined by the Hudson River and is the border of Columbia County.

U.S. Route 9W and the New York State Thruway (Interstate 87) pass through the town.

Climate data for Athens, New York
Month	Jan	Feb	Mar	Apr	May	Jun	Jul	Aug	Sep	Oct	Nov	Dec	Year
Record high °F (°C)	66 (19)	72 (22)	85 (29)	94 (34)	95 (35)	97 (36)	103 (39)	97 (36)	96 (36)	90 (32)	82 (28)	71 (22)	103 (39)
Mean daily maximum °F (°C)	34 (1)	37 (3)	47 (8)	61 (16)	72 (22)	80 (27)	85 (29)	82 (28)	74 (23)	63 (17)	50 (10)	38 (3)	60 (16)
Mean daily minimum °F (°C)	16 (−9)	19 (−7)	28 (−2)	38 (3)	49 (9)	58 (14)	63 (17)	61 (16)	54 (12)	42 (6)	33 (1)	23 (−5)	40 (4)
Record low °F (°C)	−26 (−32)	−18 (−28)	−8 (−22)	12 (−11)	24 (−4)	34 (1)	40 (4)	37 (3)	27 (−3)	18 (−8)	5 (−15)	−15 (−26)	−26 (−32)
Average precipitation inches (mm)	3.11 (79)	2.46 (62)	3.30 (84)	3.56 (90)	4.29 (109)	3.82 (97)	3.92 (100)	3.81 (97)	3.83 (97)	3.47 (88)	3.36 (85)	3.10 (79)	42.03 (1,068)
Average snowfall inches (cm)	8.7 (22)	7.0 (18)	3.9 (9.9)	1.2 (3.0)	0 (0)	0 (0)	0 (0)	0 (0)	0 (0)	0 (0)	0.8 (2.0)	6.7 (17)	28.3 (72)
Source: PlantMaps

== Demographics ==
Historical population
Census	Pop.	Note	%±
1820	2,030		—
1830	2,425		19.5%
1840	2,387		−1.6%
1850	2,986		25.1%
1860	2,791		−6.5%
1870	2,942		5.4%
1880	3,065		4.2%
1890	2,876		−6.2%
1900	2,891		0.5%
1910	2,720		−5.9%
1920	2,361		−13.2%
1930	2,254		−4.5%
1940	2,375		5.4%
1950	2,372		−0.1%
1960	2,804		18.2%
1970	3,567		27.2%
1980	3,462		−2.9%
1990	3,561		2.9%
2000	3,988		12.0%
2010	4,089		2.5%
2020	3,916		−4.2%
U.S. Decennial Census

As of the census of 2000, there were 3,991 people, 1,600 households, and 1,110 families residing in the town. The population density was 152.5 inhabitants per square mile (58.9/km^{2}). There were 1,972 housing units, with an average density of 75.3 per square mile (29.1/km^{2}). The racial makeup of the town was 95.87% White, 0.98% Black or African American, 0.28% Native American, 0.85% Asian, 0.05% Pacific Islander, 0.65% from other races, and 1.33% from two or more races. Hispanic or Latino of any race were 1.70% of the population.

There were 1,600 households, out of which 29.4% had children under the age of 18 living with them, 54.8% were married couples living together, 9.7% had a female householder with no husband present, and 30.6% were non-families. 25.3% of all households were made up of individuals, and 13.4% had someone living alone who was 65 years of age or older. The average household size was 2.48 and the average family size was 2.96.

In the town, the population was spread out, with 23.3% under the age of 18, 5.9% from 18 to 24, 27.8% from 25 to 44, 27.2% from 45 to 64, and 15.9% who were 65 years of age or older. The median age was 41 years. For every 100 females, there were 94.2 males. For every 100 females age 18 and over, there were 92.0 males.

The median income for a household in the town was $39,719, and the median income for a family was $43,672. Males had a median income of $33,913 versus $22,316 for females. The per capita income for the town was $20,910. About 7.0% of families and 8.7% of the population were below the poverty line, including 11.4% of those under age 18 and 8.6% of those age 65 or over.

== Communities and locations in the Town of Athens ==
- Athens – The village of Athens is on the eastern edge of the town.
- Athens Station – A location south of West Athens.
- Hollister Lake – A lake in the northwestern part of the town.
- Lime Street – A hamlet in the northwestern part of the town.
- Middle Ground Flats – An island in the Athens River.
- Sleepy Hollow Lake – A lake at the northern town line.
- West Athens – A hamlet in the northeastern part of the town, located on Route 28.
- The Orchards A subdivision in the northwestern corner of the village that gets no village services.

== Electric power facilities ==
=== New Athens Generating ===
Pursuant to Article X of the Public Service Law, Athens Generating Company, L.P. (now operating as New Athens Generating Company, LLC) was granted a Certificate of Environmental Compatibility and Public Need for a 1,080-megawatt (MW) combined cycle natural gas powered plant in 2000. It went into service in 2004. There are three combustion turbines whose exhaust creates steam to drive a steam turbine. All of the combustion turbines are manufactured by Siemens. It uses a wet/dry (hybrid) cooling system consisting of three groups of six hybrid cooling units. It is located on a 150-acre area that was zoned as light industrial, to the west of the Village of Athens. In 2017, it injected 3,891 GWh of electric energy into the electric transmission system. This is equivalent to operating at full capacity for approximately 40.4% of the year. For comparison, the capital region consumed 11,823 GWh of electric energy in 2017.

The plant has reorganized and transferred ownership several times since it was granted a certificate in 2000. As of 2018 it is owned by New Athens Generating Company, LLC, which is owned by New Mach Gen, LLC, which is owned by Mach Gen, LLC, which is owned by Talen Energy Supply, LLC, which is owned by Riverstone Holdings LLC. It was noted in a recent declaratory ruling that Con Edison has a bilateral agreement with New Athens Generating Company whereby Con Edison buys the plant's output and sells it in the NYISO wholesale market. In its 2017-2018 adopted budget, the Village of Athens noted a revenue of about $9,000 from payments in lieu of taxes most of which can be assumed to come from New Athens Generating Company, LLC. For comparison, the Village of Athens noted a total budget of about $2.15 million for 2017-2018.

=== West Point Partners ===
A High Voltage Direct Current underground transmission line was proposed in an Article VII filing with the Public Service Commission in 2013. Its northern converter station would have been located adjacent to the New Athens Generating facility. The certification process was placed in limbo after the real estate for its planned southern converter station near the Indian Point Energy Center was sold in private auction from Con Edison to the Town of Cortlandt.

== In popular culture ==
A major plot point in War of the Worlds (2005) took place in Athens. In the movie, most of the town is shown being destroyed. These are the scenes where the flaming train passes by the cast and the crowd is going towards the ferry.
